= Téléfoot =

French television programme

- Starring: Grégoire Margotton; Frédéric Calenge; Bixente Lizarazu
- Country of origin: France

Production
- Running time: 60 minutes (inc. adverts)

Original release
- Network: TF1
- Release: 16 September 1977 – present

Téléfoot is a French football programme produced by TF1 Production for TF1. The programme was created by Pierre Cangioni in 1977 to show French Division 1 highlights. Téléfoot now covers France international matches, European club competitions and foreign football leagues.

== History ==
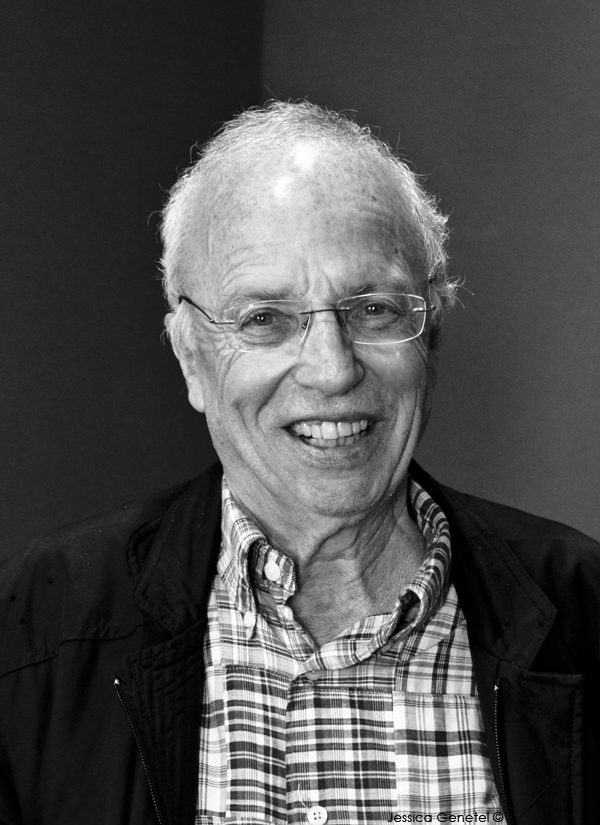
Thierry Roland was presenter of Téléfoot from 1984 to 2004.

In 1977, Pierre Cangioni had the idea for a French football television programme. He pitched the idea to bosses of TF1, who agreed to pay 700,000F to acquire the rights for the coverage from Division 1. It was France's first dedicated football television programme, and Cangioni was the show's first presenter. The original format was two matches, each with ten minutes of highlights, and an in depth look at some players, and the show was broadcast on Saturday evenings. The show was not allowed to be broadcast before 10:30pm so that people were able to go to matches and get home in time for Téléfoot. Initially trialled for 15 programmes under the name of Téléfoot 1 (so that the programme initials were TF1), TF1 decided to renew the show for the 1978, and renamed the show Téléfoot. In 1979, TF1 signed a three-year contract with Ligue 1 for the rights, at a cost of 9 million francs.

In 1981, Téléfoot replaced Cangioni with Michel Denisot as presenter, and the programme was moved to Sunday mornings. From 1983 until June 1984, Jean Raynal hosted the show. Didier Roustan was the temporary presenter in June 1984, before being replaced by Thierry Roland. Roland presented the show from 1984 until 2003. Roland's co-hosts included Roustan, Roger Zabel, Frédéric Jaillant, Jean-Michel Larqué, Pascal Praud, Vincent Hardy, and Christian Jeanpierre. Roland commentated for Téléfoot on the 1998 FIFA World Cup Final. He is now known for the quote "Je crois qu'après avoir vu ça, On peut mourir tranquille" ("I think that after seeing that, We can die quiet") after France won the match.

After Roland's departure, Jeanpierre hosted the show in 2004, alongside Nathalie Renoux. In January 2005, they were replaced by Thierry Gilardi, who presented the show until his death in 2008. After his death, Téléfoot gave a special tribute to him, including interviews with Didier Drogba and Jacques Vendroux. Christian Jeanpierre took over from Gilardi as Téléfoot presenter, and his first programme was the one dedicated to Gilardi. Co-presenters alongside Jeanpierre included Frédéric Calenge and Charlotte Namura, and Bixente Lizarazu made guest host appearances on the show. After the 2018 FIFA World Cup, Jeanpierre was replaced by Grégoire Margotton as the main presenter of Téléfoot.

In 2007, Téléfoot lost the rights to Ligue 1 football, after the Ligue de Football Professionnel awarded the rights to Canal+; subsequently France Télévisions obtained the highlights upon winning the tender for the Sunday magazine by creating France 2 Foot, which only lasted one season. Téléfoot continued to show highlights of foreign matches, European club competitions, and international matches. After the decision, former presenter Roland said that he would no longer watch Téléfoot, as he wanted to see French league goals. TF1 were the only free-to-air French channel with coverage of the 2018 FIFA World Cup. TF1 had won the rights to broadcast twelve matches at UEFA Euro 2020.

In June 2020, it was announced that TF1 had partnered with new Ligue 1 rightsholder Mediapro to launch a Téléfoot-branded pay television channel. The channel closed on 8 February 2021 after Mediapro exited its contract, and Canal+ reassumed them on an interim basis.

== In popular culture ==
The French version of the Nintendo 64 game Michael Owen's WLS 2000 was called Telefoot Soccer 2000.
