= Pierre Cangioni =

French sports journalist (born 1939)

- Born: 29 July 1939 (age 86); Paris, France
- Occupation: Sports journalist
- Known for: Presenter of Téléfoot (1977–1982); President of the Olympique de Marseille (1994–1995)

Pierre Cangioni (born 29 July 1939) is a French sports journalist, best known for presenting the French football television programme Téléfoot from 1977 to 1982. He was the president of Olympique de Marseille from 1994 to 1995.

== Personal life ==
Cangioni was born in Paris in 1939. His parents were from Corsica, and he grew up in Bocognano, Corsica. He remembers Bocognano being protected by the Italian Army during the Second World War. He attended Bocognano school. His family later moved to Ajaccio.

== Career ==
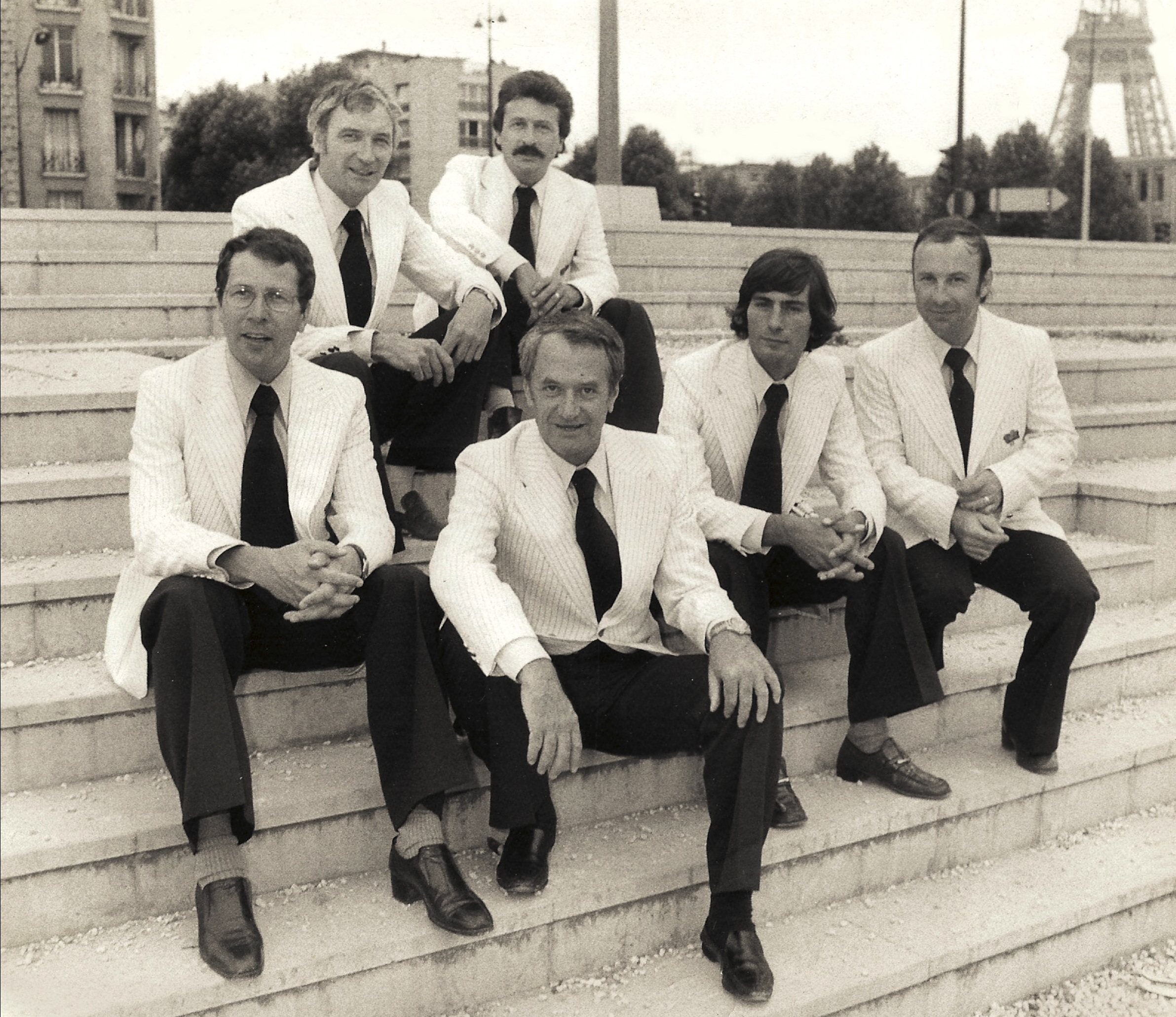
TF1 presenters including Cangioni at the 1977 French Open

Cangioni started working on the television coverage of French sport in 1972, commentating on football and boxing. He worked as a commentator on the French television coverage of the 1976 European Cup Final between Bayern Munich and Saint-Étienne at Hampden Park in Glasgow, Scotland. In 1977, Cangioni had the idea for a French football television programme. He pitched the idea to bosses of TF1, who agreed to pay 700,000 F to acquire the rights for the coverage from Division 1. Cangioni presented the first episode of Téléfoot, France's first dedicated football television programme. He presented the programme for five years. Cangioni commentated with Jean Raynal at the 1978 FIFA World Cup in Argentina. In 1986, Cangioni also commentated on Formula One and the Paris–Dakar Rally.

Fellow Téléfoot presenter Christian Jeanpierre said that Cangioni had a distinctive Corsican accent. French footballer Zinedine Zidane said that Cangioni was one of "the three voices of French football commentary, along with Thierry Roland and Thierry Gilardi."

In December 1994, Cangioni became the president of Olympique de Marseille, replacing Bernard Tapie, who had been forced to resign due to the French football bribery scandal. Cangioni took ownership of 33% of the club, with the rest still belonging to Tapie. He left the role in May 1995, saying that the role was not well suited to him. In 2009, Cangioni was critical of the appointment of Jean-Claude Dassier as Marseille president.
