= Berga =

- Municipality
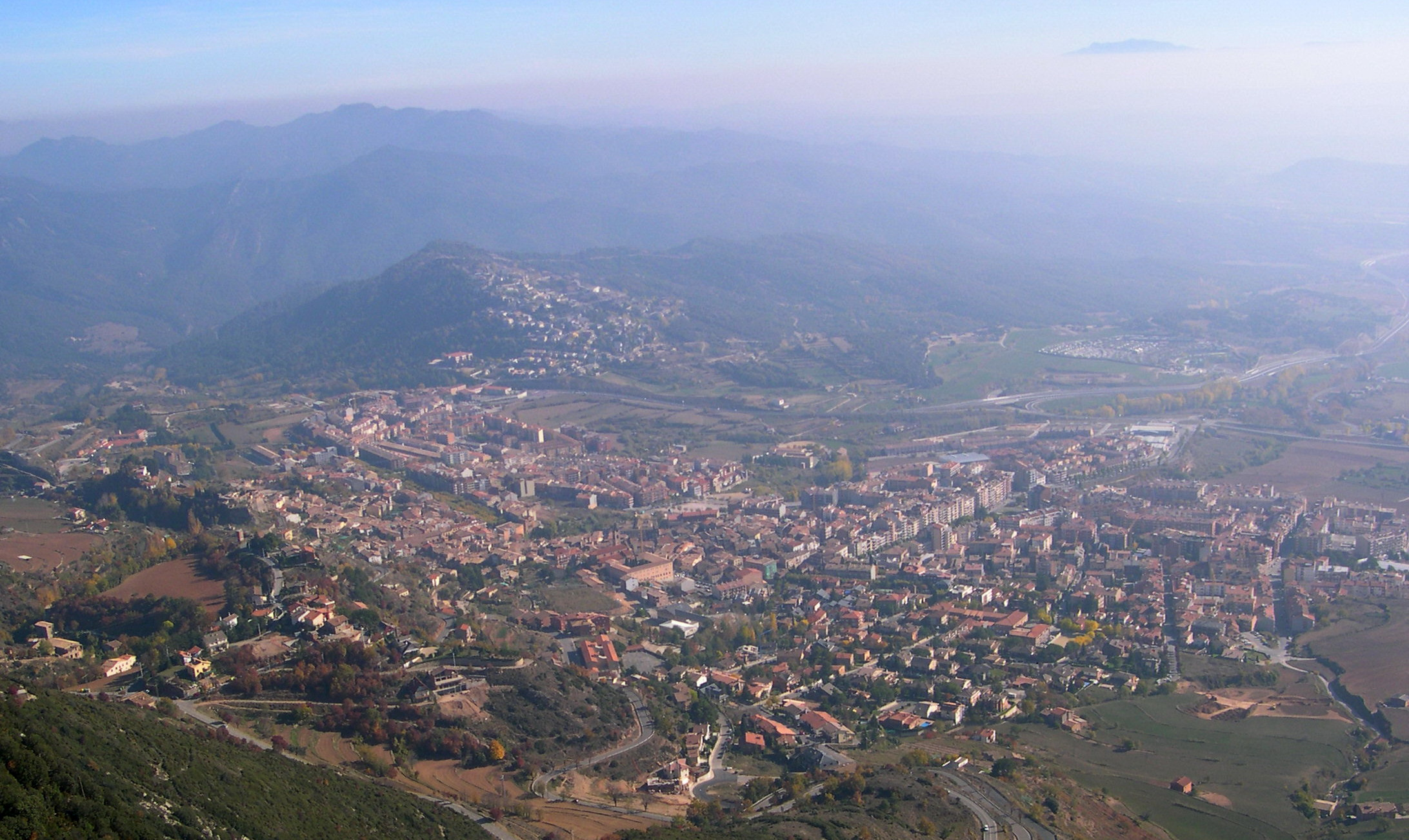

- Flag Coat of arms

- Location in Catalonia Location in Spain
- Coordinates: 42°06′04″N 1°50′38″E
- Country: Spain
- Community: Catalonia
- Province: Barcelona
- Comarca: Berguedà

Government
  - Mayor: Ivan Sánchez (2021) (CUP)

Area
  - Total: 22.6 km^{2} (8.7 sq mi)
- Elevation: 704 m (2,310 ft)

Population (2025-01-01)
  - Total: 17,473
  - Density: 773/km^{2} (2,000/sq mi)
- Demonym: Berguedà
- Postal code: 08600
- Climate: Cfb
- Website: ajberga.cat

Berga (Catalan pronunciation: [ˈbeɾɣə]) is the capital of the comarca (county) of Berguedà, in the province of Barcelona, Catalonia, Spain. It is bordered by the municipalities of Cercs, Olvan, Avià, Capolat and Castellar del Riu.

== History ==
Berga derives its name from the Bergistani, an Iberian tribe which lived in the area before the Roman conquest. The Bergistani were first subdued by Hannibal in 218 BC. They rebelled twice against the Romans and were twice defeated; after their second uprising, much of the tribe was sold into slavery. Livy mentions their principal town, Castrum Bergium, which was probably the precursor of the present-day town of Berga. During the eighth century the area was occupied by Muslim forces; according to local tradition, Berga was destroyed during this period, It was subsequently conquered by the Franks and repopulated before 835. Berga Castle is first recorded in a document dating from about 855.

During the ninth century, the Country of Berga developed within the County of Cerdanya. It acquired a more independent character in the early tenth century, with Berga as its capital; in 905 it was administered by the viscount Branduí. The town later had its own counts from 988.

Berga was sold to king Peter II of Aragon in 1199. In 1254 a synod held in Berga condemned 168 people accused of heresy. Two years later Pere II de Berga granted the town its first charter of franchises. In 1309, Berga was sold to James II of Aragon and became a royal town. During the fourteenth century, its definitive walls were built, and the town included a Jewish quarter with its own synagogue. In 1393, Berga was reincorporated into the royal patrimony.

During the First Carlist War, Carlist forces under Antonio de Urbiztondo captured Berga on 12 July 1837. The Carlist governing junta subsequently moved there from Solsona, making Berga the capital of Catalan Carlism; it became widely known as the Junta de Berga. Carlist coinage was issued at Berga between 1838 and 1840, including pieces bearing the title of claimant Carlos V. Liberal forces occupied Berga in July 1840, as the remaining Carlist forces withdrew across the French border. Berga was again occupied by Carlist forces during the Third Carlist War in 1873. After their expulsion by Republican troops in May, the town was granted the official title of city in 1877.

Textile production had been documented in Berga since the medieval period. Around 1790, Ramon Farguell, known as Maixerí developed the multi-spindle spinning machine known as the berguedana or maixerina. Later versions accommodated up to 120 spindles, and the machine helped establish Berga as one of Catalonia´s leading cotton-manufacturing centres. During the nineteenth century, industrial development expanded along the Llobregat, while the town´s cotton industry experienced its greatest growth after the Spanish Civil War before declining from the 1960s onwards.

In May 2012, the town council passed a motion declaring King Juan Carlos 'persona non grata' following a series of scandals involving the royal family, most notably the king's recent elephant hunting trip to Africa in the middle of Spain's deepening recession.

== Heritage ==
The Portal de Santa Magdalena is the only surviving late-medieval gate of Berga´s former walled enclosure. It stands on the town´s north-eastern side and historically connected Berga with the royal road to Bagà and Ripoll.

== La Patum ==
The Patum de Berga, or simply La Patum, is a popular and traditional festival that is celebrated each year in the city. Locals dress as mystical and symbolic figures, and are accompanied either by the rhythm of a drum (the tabal, whose sound gives the festival its name) or band music.

== Free Software Street ==
On July 3, 2010 the world's first Free Software Street was inaugurated in Berga, during a ceremony attended by Richard Stallman.

== Sister cities ==
- Guernica, Basque Country, Spain
- Tarascon-sur-Ariège, France
- Högsby, Sweden

== Notable people ==
- Alfonsina Bueno
- Antonio Comellas y Cluet
- José Cunill Postius
- Marc Bernal

== See also ==
- La Guita Xica
