= Didier Roustan =

French sports journalist (1957–2024)

- Born: 10 October 1957; Brazzaville, French Congo, French Equatorial Africa
- Died: 11 September 2024 (aged 66); Paris, France
- Career
- Show: Téléfoot; Mag Max; Foot!
- Network: TF1; Canal+; France 2; TV5Monde; L'Équipe
- Country: France

Didier Roustan (10 October 1957 – 11 September 2024) was a French sports journalist who presented and commentated for multiple French football channels, and most notably worked for L'Équipe television channel. In 1984, he was the temporary main presenter of the French football programme Téléfoot, during which time he commentated on France's victory at UEFA Euro 1984.

== Career ==
Roustan played youth football for AS Cannes, but was suspended at the age of 17 after an altercation with a trainer. At the age of 18, Roustan joined TF1 for an internship. He was chosen for the role by Georges de Caunes. His internship was for three months, but Roustan stayed at TF1 for 13 and a half years. At the age of 21, he featured on TF1 football programme Téléfoot. In 1979, Roustan commentated on a match between France and Sweden, making him the youngest Frenchman to commentate on a France senior team match. Roustan was the temporary presenter of Téléfoot in June 1984, before being replaced by Thierry Roland. Roustan was remembered for his commentary at UEFA Euro 1984, which was won by France.

In 1989, Roustan joined Canal+, where he worked on the 52-minute programme Mag Max. Roustan left TF1 in 1989 after a disagreement with TF1 shareholder and Olympique de Marseille president Bernard Tapie about TF1's coverage of Marseille matches. After deciding to go travelling for three years, Roustan later joined France 2 in 1993. He worked on a France 2 sports betting programme with Basile Boli, Emmanuel Petit and Louise Ekland. From 2004 to 2006, Roustan worked as a commentator for Foot!, TV5Monde's football programme. He commentated on Ligue 1, UEFA Champions League, and French national football matches. Roustan also worked as a radio commentator for RTL for many years, before leaving the station in 2019. He then worked for L'Équipe TV channel. Roustan said that fellow sports journalist Jean Raynal was his inspiration. Roustan was nicknamed Che Guevara, as he was sceptical of the role of money in football.

Aside from commentating and presenting, Roustan set up a monthly football magazine called United Colours of Football in 1993. In 1995, he helped to set up International Association of Professional Footballers, the first world union of footballers, working alongside Diego Maradona and Eric Cantona. Roustan suggested to Cantona and Maradona that each of them should contribute $7,000 to support the new union, and the union started with 48 members including Cantona, Maradona, and Gianluca Vialli. In 1997, Roustan organised an International Association of Professional Footballers charity match between Europe and Rest of the World. The match featured Cantona, Maradona, René Higuita, Gus Poyet, Rubén Sosa, and Giovane Élber. The union ended in 1998, in part due to the recreation of FIFPro. Roustan also created the Foot Citoyen social project, which was supported by Arsène Wenger. Some charity events for Foot Citoyen were attended by Zinedine Zidane. Roustan also ran a blog and weekly podcast called Roustan Foot.

Roustan's last commentary match was the 2024 Copa América match between Argentina and Canada.

== Personal life and death ==
Didier Roustan was born on 10 October 1957 in Brazzaville, French Equatorial Africa (now Republic of the Congo). His mother was from Martinique, and worked for Agence France-Presse. Roustan grew up in Cannes, France.

Roustan died of liver cancer in Paris on 11 September 2024, at the age of 66. Following his death, L'Équipe chose to dedicate an evening of broadcasting to him, including showing a re-run of the UEFA Euro 1984 semi-final between France and Portugal which featured his commentary.

== Honours ==
In 2015, Roustan was awarded a Prix de la Carriere (lifetime achievement award) by the Association des écrivains sportifs.
