= Téléfoot (TV channel) =

French subscription sports channel dedicated to football

- Country: France
- Broadcast area: France; Monaco

Programming
- Picture format: 576i (16:9 SDTV); 1080i (HDTV); 2160p (UHDTV)

Ownership
- Owner: Mediapro

History
- Launched: 17 August 2020; 6 years ago
- Closed: 8 February 2021; 5 years ago

Links
- Website: Official website

Téléfoot: La Chaîne du Foot (English: Telefoot: The Football Channel), also known as simply Téléfoot, was a French pay television channel owned by Mediapro. Launched on 17 August 2020, it was established as part of an agreement by Mediapro with Ligue de Football Professionnel (LFP) to acquire rights to Ligue 1 and Ligue 2 football beginning in the 2020-21 season. TF1 Group served as a content partner for the channel, under which it was branded as an extension of its football programme Téléfoot and employed its on-air personalities. The network was offered via both television providers and as an over-the-top streaming service.

Mediapro began to withhold its rights payments in October 2020, seeking to renegotiate the deal due to the financial impact of the COVID-19 pandemic in France. In December 2020, after Mediapro missed a second rights payment, it agreed to exit the contract and compensate LFP for the missed payments. Téléfoot continued operations on an interim basis until February 2021, when previous rightsholder Groupe Canal+ reached an interim agreement to acquire the media rights for the remainder of the 2020–21 season. In turn, beIN Sports would sub-license exclusive rights to Ligue 2 from Canal+. Téléfoot shut down on 8 February 2021.

== History ==
On 29 May 2018, Mediapro won four of the five main lots of media rights to the Ligue de Football Professionnel (LFP) for 2020-21 through 2023–24, largely replacing Canal+ as broadcaster of most Ligue 1 fixtures. It was expected that Mediapro would establish a new pay television channel to hold these rights. In August 2019, Mediapro France appointed Julien Bergeaud as its managing director in preparation for the new rights. The Ligue 1 rights were valued at €780 million per-season, and gave it rights to the top Ligue 1 fixtures, and eight of 10 Ligue 2 fixtures weekly. beIN Sports acquired the remaining lot, covering two weekly Ligue 1 fixtures on Saturday nights and Sunday afternoons. It would later sub-license this package to Canal+.

In October 2019, in an attempt to bolster the proposed channel, Mediapro bid for the next cycle of French rights to the UEFA Champions League. It was unsuccessful (with the rights being acquired by beIN Sports and Canal+), but Mediapro would later reach a three-year deal to carry UEFA Europa League matches on the new channel beginning in the 2021–22 season, covering 266 matches per-season, and Europa Conference League matches. Canal+ holds the first pick of 16 Europa League matches per-season, selected UECL matches, and the finals for both.

In January 2020, Mediapro submitted an application to the Conseil supérieur de l'audiovisuel for approval of the new channel, stating that it planned to charge €25 per-month, and aimed to reach 3.5 million subscribers.

On 2 June 2020, Mediapro announced that it had partnered with TF1 Group to brand the new channel as Téléfoot, making it an extension of the long-running TF1 football programme of the same name. As part of the partnership, TF1 was to also provide editorial resources and talent for the channel, including its broadcast team of Grégoire Margotton and Bixente Lizarazu for marquee matches.

On 27 July 2020, it was reported that Téléfoot was negotiating an agreement to sub-license half of Altice/RMC Sport's rights to the UEFA Champions League for the 2020–21 season (the last season of its current contract), as part of Altice's downsizing of its sports broadcasting business. The agreement was also reported to include carriage of Téléfoot on SFR.

On 30 July 2020, L'Équipe reported that Mediapro had established a partnership with Netflix to offer bundles of the service with Téléfoot at a discount. It was also suggested that Netflix could provide backend support for the channel's over-the-top services, although Netflix itself would not carry the network's content. On 14 August, Bouygues Telecom agreed to carry the service. On 25 August, Iliad agreed to carry the service for Freebox.

=== Non-payment of rights fees ===
On 16 October 2020, it was reported that Mediapro had begun to withhold its rights payments to the LFP, seeking to renegotiate the contract due to the financial impact of the COVID-19 pandemic in France. The company missed a €172.3 million rights payment which was due 5 October; the LFP had denied a request from Mediapro to extend its deadline. LFP CEO Arnaud Rouger informed its clubs that it was prepared to move its media rights elsewhere if they are unable to resolve the impasse with Mediapro. On 20 November, RMC Sport reported that the LFP was in negotiations with Canal+.

Mediapro missed a second rights payment due 5 December. On 11 December, it was reported that Mediapro had agreed to exit the contract, and that it would pay €100 million in compensation for the two missed rights payments. In exchange, the LFP agreed to not take legal action against the company. Téléfoot's employees were informed of an impending shutdown of the channel, although it was suggested that it would likely remain in operation until a new broadcast agreement is reached. Mediapro initially stated that the network planned to close on 23 December 2020. However, Téléfoot would continue operating under an interim agreement while the LFP renegotiated its broadcasting deals. This temporary agreement was to expire on 3 February 2021.

=== Winddown and closure ===
Amazon Prime Video, DAZN, and Discovery Networks EMEA made bids for the packages being vacated by Mediapro, but none of them met the LFP's asking price. After the LFP denied a request by Canal+ to renegotiate the rights for its lot, Canal+ sued the LFP to seek a renegotiation of the entirety of its media rights. On 4 February 2021, the LFP announced that it had reached an agreement with Canal+ to serve as an interim rightsholder for the remainder of the 2020–21 season. The broadcaster reportedly paid €35 million for the rights to the packages, on top of the €330 million it pays annually for its two weekly matches. The LFP is expected to renegotiate its media rights for the following season.

The final match aired by Téléfoot was a Le Classique fixture on 7 February 2021. As part of an agreement with the LFP, Canal+ sub-licensed non-exclusive rights to the match to air in simulcast. Canal+ officially took over the LFP media rights the following week. Téléfoot closed on 8 February 2021. On 12 February, Canal+ sub-licensed its Ligue 2 rights for this season exclusively to beIN Sports.

The collapse of the Mediapro contract was expected to have a major financial impact on the LFP and its clubs, especially those that had anticipated revenue increases under the agreement. In total, the LFP was expected to receive a total of €670 million from its broadcast rights during the season, down from the €726.5 million it received under the previous contracts, and the €1.14 billion it was meant to receive from the new contracts annually. On 11 February 2021, the LFP announced plans to seek a bailout from the French government to cover losses tied to COVID-19. Of the Mediapro contract, the organization stated that "the clubs have already made great efforts to adapt to this major drop in income, both through the salary negotiations initiated with their players and through the reforms that the LFP is preparing to ensure its future."

In June 2021, Amazon Prime Video reached an agreement to replace Téléfoot as the main rightsholder of Ligue 1, under a €825 million contract through the 2023–24 season.
