= Tregurà de Dalt =

Village in Girona, Spain

Coordinates: 42°20′36″N 2°17′15″E

Tregurà de Dalt is a village located in the Ripoll, Gerona, Spain. It is located at an altitude of 1,425 m. In 1996 it had 30 inhabitants. The village has a church named "Sant Julià de Tregurà".

== Gallery ==
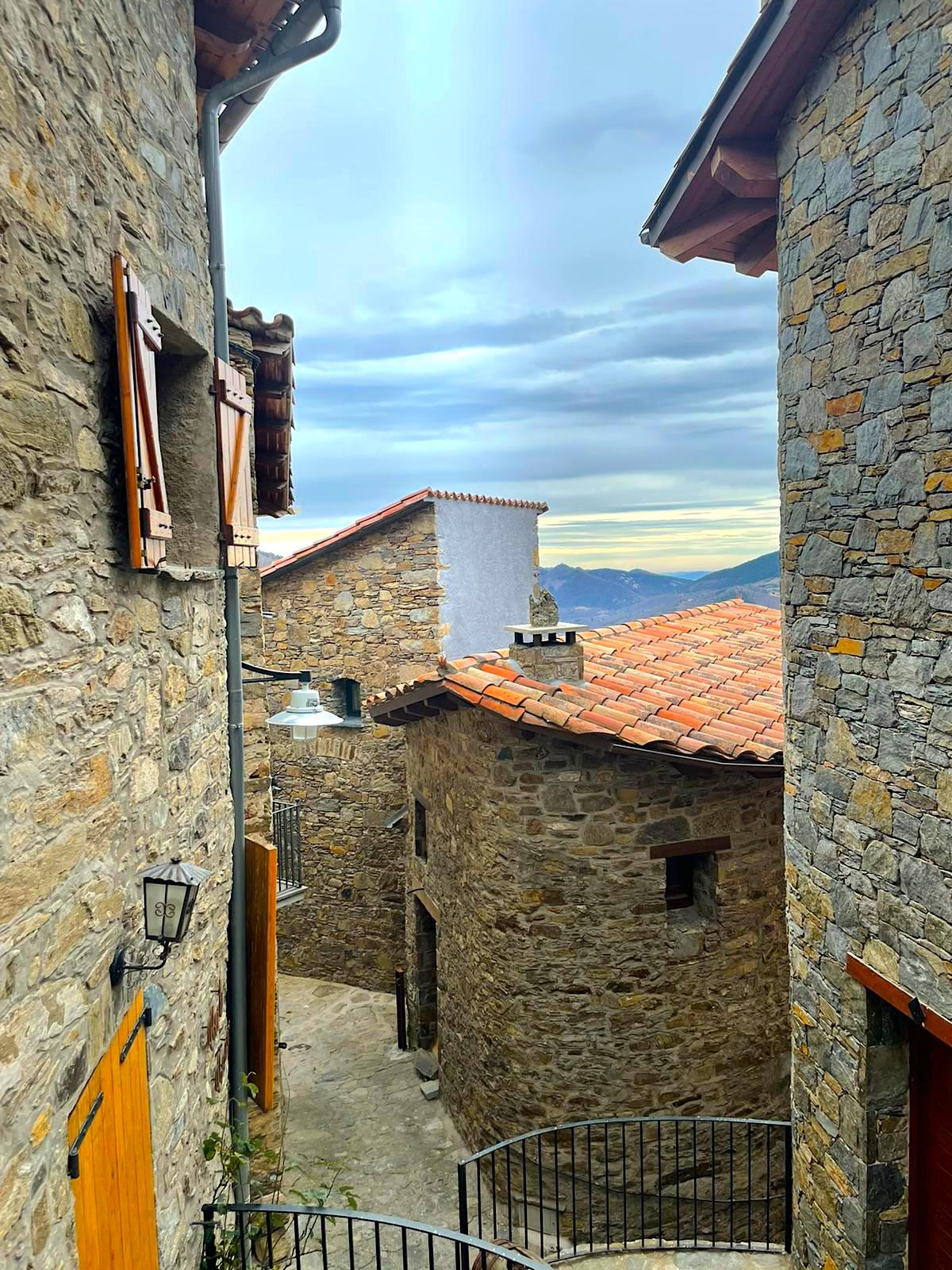

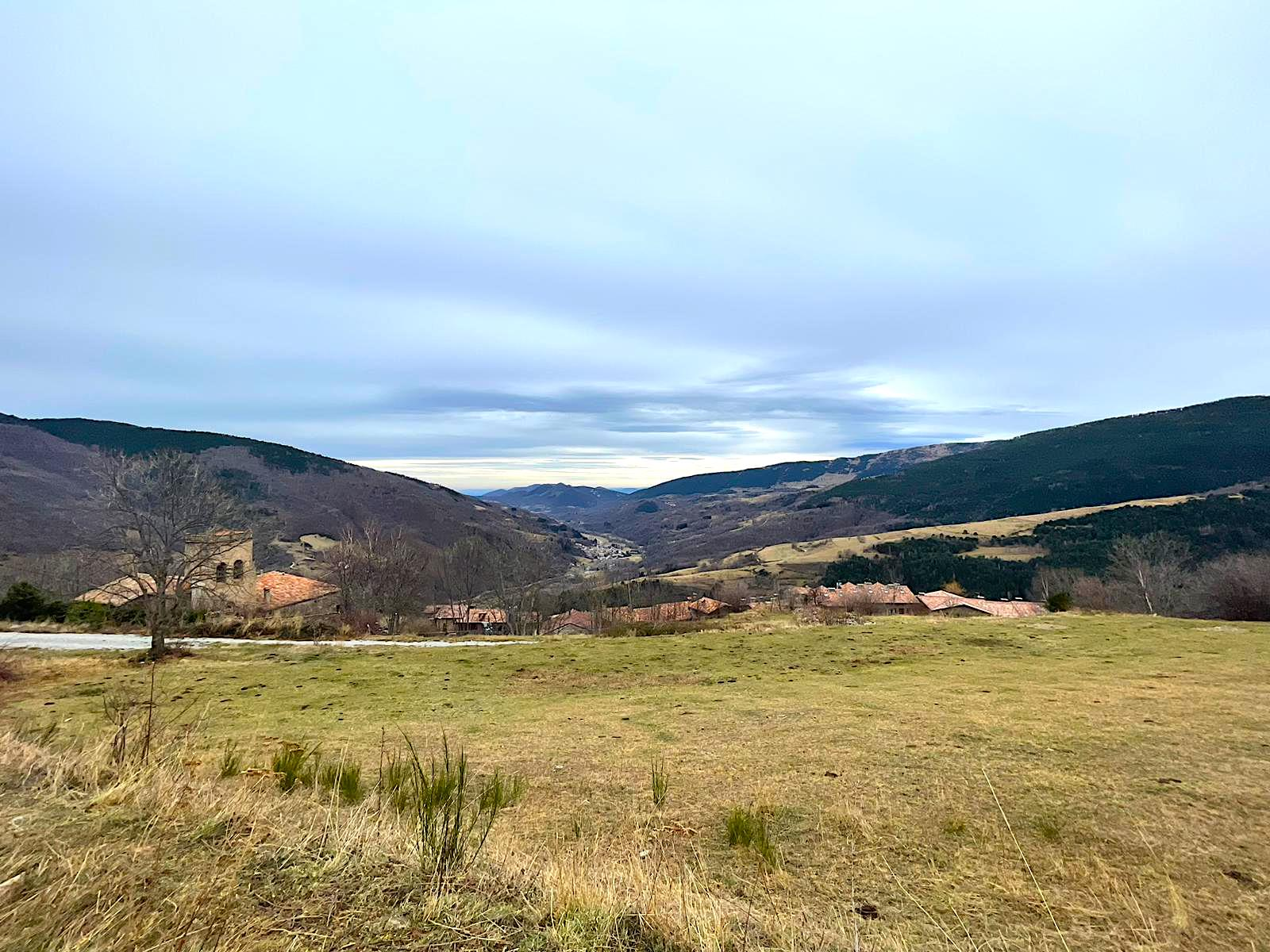

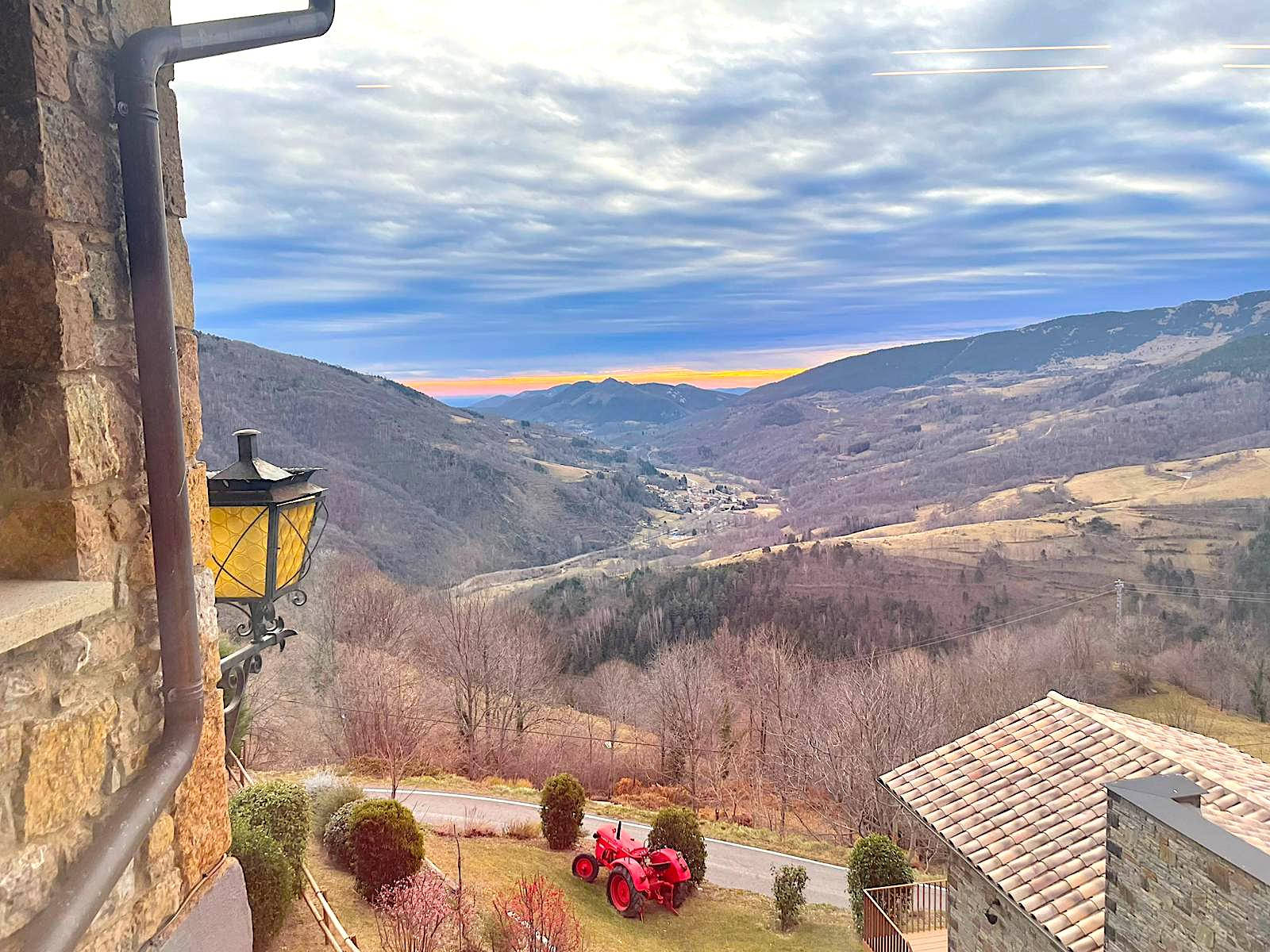
