= Jeanpierre (surname) =

Jeanpierre is a surname. It may refer to:

- Christian Jeanpierre (born 1965), French journalist
- Julien Jeanpierre (born 1980), French tennis player
- Lemuel Jeanpierre (born 1987), American football player and coach
- Pierre Jeanpierre (1912–1958), French Army officer
