= Monsieur Basket =

Monsieur Basket (literally: Mr Basketball) is a nickname that may refer to:

- Alain Gilles (1945–2014), French basketball player and coach
- Jean Raynal (1929–2015), French sports journalist
