= Media Coach =

Mediacoach
- Developer(s): Mediapro
- Available in: Spanish
- License: Proprietary

Mediacoach is a proprietary video motion analysis tool developed by Spanish media company, Mediapro, for the 42 football clubs of the Liga de Fútbol Profesional.

The stadium-based software uses 16 cameras placed all around the stadium to carry out post-match analysis of player movement. Each system cost €400,000 to install.
