= Ponç de la Guàrdia =

Ponç de la Guàrdia (or Pons de la Guardia; fl. 1154–1188) was a Catalan knight of the family of Saguàrdia, lords of the castle of Ripoll. He was not a professional jongleur, but a troubadour who wrote songs for amusement which were much celebrated, so we are told, by Occitan women.

Ponç participated in the Siege of Conca (1177) on the side of Alfonso II of Aragon and a little later in the campaign to bring Raymond V of Toulouse to heel.

He wrote four amorous compositions which form a small cycle dedicated to an anonymous lady called "On-tot-mi-platz". It has been suggested by one editor of his works, that nine of his songs form a cycle with the plot of a roman d'amour, but the ordering of these cycles is not the same in the different manuscripts, one of which considers them anonymous. Ponç is one of the few troubadours suspected of anthologising his own works. Though his work is all in Occitan, some Catalan words make appearances.

== Sources ==
- Bossy, Michel-André. "Cyclical Composition in Guiraut Riquier's Book of Poems." Speculum, Vol. 66, No. 2. (Apr., 1991), pp 277–293.
