= Patum de Berga =

Traditional Catalan festival

Patum of Berga
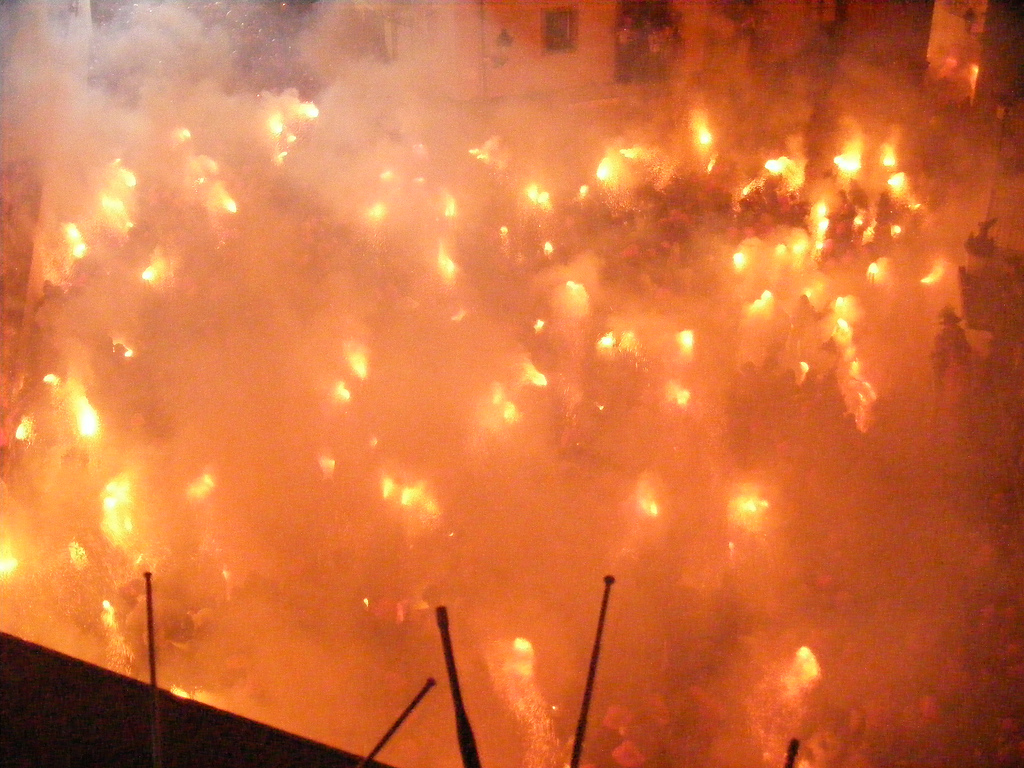
- Date: Corpus Christi
- Frequency: Annual
- Locations: Berga, Catalonia, Spain

Patum of Berga
- UNESCO Intangible Cultural Heritage
- Country: Spain
- Reference: 00156
- Region: Europe and North America

Inscription history
- Inscription: 2008 (3rd session)
- List: Representative

The Patum de Berga (Catalan pronunciation: [pəˈtum də ˈβeɾɣə]), or simply La Patum, is a popular and traditional festival that is celebrated each year in the Catalan city of Berga (Barcelona) during Corpus Christi, typically between late May and late June. It consists of a series of "dances", called salts, by townspeople carrying mystical and symbolic figures and accompanied either by the rhythm of a drum—the tabal, whose sound gives the festival its name—or band music. The salts are marked by their solemnity and their ample use of fire and pyrotechnics.

It was declared a Traditional Festival of National Interest by the Generalitat de Catalunya in 1983. In 2005, UNESCO declared it one of the Masterpieces of the Oral and Intangible Heritage of Humanity and, in 2008, inscribed it on its Representative List.

== Origins and significance ==
"La Patum" developed from medieval festivities and processions associated with Corpus Christi. Some interpretations identify older ritual or pre-Christian elements within the festival, but its documented historical development is closely connected with the Corpus celebrations of Berga. In Berga, La Patum has been celebrated since at least 1454. The origins of the festival come from the figures in this procession, destined to educate the people on Christian values. With time, the figures acquired a more festive aspect. This evolved into La Bullícia del Santíssim Sagrament, or Bulla, referenced in 1715.

The festival evolved and incorporated more elements of popular and religious theater during the period called Procés de Potenciació de la Patum, in the 19th century, leading to a unique combination of giants, devils, angels, moors, and other bizarre-looking characters.

Despite the religious significance of Corpus Christi and the Patum's descent from "eucharistic performances," in its present form it is rather a show of popular theater. La Patum has been the subject of scholarly research in folklore, anthropology and performance studies. During Spain´s transition to democracy, it attracted participants from across Catalonia and became a focus of democratic and Catalan nationalist resistance.

The festival´s comparses are historic objects as well as performing figures. A conversation study notes that many are at least a century old; they perform during the five days of Corpus celebrations and have received annual conservation treatment by qualified specialists since 2004.

== Main Events ==
=== Quatre Fuets ===
The Quatre Fuets (Four Fuets) are two salts of Maces with the objective of try the fuets (gerbs that explode, called like this because of their shape) that will be used the next days. It is performed during Trinity Sunday.

=== Full Patum ===
Patum Completa (Full Patum) is the main event of the festival. They are celebrated during the nights of Thursday and Sunday. The square fills with people while the troupes perform their salts in its center. They enter one by one, and the assistants leap around them. There are four rounds of salts when every troupe does their dance, except for the Plens, who only do their salt at the end of the second and fourth rounds. After the second salt of plens, around 3:00 a.m., the Guites and the Gegants Vells start the Tirabols. Full Patums always start with the band playing Els Segadors.

=== Cerimonial Patum ===
Patum de Lluïment (Cerimonial Patum) is shorter and less crowded than full Patum. They are celebrated on Thursday and Sunday at 12:00 p.m., when the mass ends. Only one round is done, without the Plens. The Tirabols are performed by the Guites and the two couples of Gegants. It starts with the entourage of the local authorities from the church to the town hall.

=== Parades ===
Passacarrers/Passades (Parades) are processions throughout the old quarter of Berga. There are two types:

- The midday passacarrers are only done on Wednesday. The Tabal, followed by both couples of Gegants, dances with the music played by a band. It is the only act without fireworks.
- The night passacerrers are done on Wednesday and Saturday. The Tabal, followed by the Maces, Guites, and the old couple of Gegants, dance throughout the streets of Berga to stop in some squares to do a salt. They are ended with Tirabols.

=== Children's Patum ===
The Patum Infantil (Children's Patum) is celebrated on Friday, with the vacant troupes being raffled some weeks earlier. This event consists of a passacarrers during the morning, Cerimonial Patum at midday, and Full Patum during the afternoon and evening.

== Figures ==
=== El Tabal ===
The Tabal (Drum) is the only element that participates in every single act. It consists of a person that carries a big drum, built in 1726 (documented since 1621). This figure doesn't have any specific symbolism, but it is in charge of coordinating the figures. Every Ascension Sunday, it has the task of announcing the decision to celebrate Patum throughout Berga.

=== Els Turcs i Cavallets ===
The Trucs/Turcs i Cavallets (Turks and Knights) are a representation of four Turk soldiers, wearing turbans and carrying scimitars, and four Christian knights with wooden horses at their waists. They enter the middle of the square together, forming two concentric circles, and begin the battle to the sound of music composed specifically for this event. The Turks charge the Christians five times, clashing their scimitars against a piece of wood carried by the knights. The act culminates with the Christians symbolically stabbing only three Turks, because one of them always manages to escape. They have been documented since 1628.

=== Les Maces ===
The Maces (The Maces), documented since 1621, are eight handles topped by round boxes with stones inside of them. This causes a very characteristic sound when they are shaken. Each one of them can have a fuet on top of them. They are carried by demons that move as they dance until the fuet explodes. When this happens, the angels stab them with a spear and a sword.

During the day, their salt is performed with eight maces and their own music, composed in 1963—they were the last figure to incorporate music—but at night, only four maces move with the sound of the tabal. The daylight salts are performed only two times every year.

=== Les Guites ===
The Guites (Mule dragons) are the most primitive troupe of the festivity. They never incorporated music, so they move around the square with the sound of the Tabal. At first, only one guita acted during Patum, but with the years, a second or even a third figure—That remains unused— was added.

- The Guita Grossa (Big dragon mule), documented since 1621, is an archaic dragon that measures more than 4 meters (13.12 ft) in height. The head, probably built during the XIV century, has an approximate weight of 20 kg (44 lbs).
- The Guita Xica/Boja (Small/Crazy dragon mule) is the only major change that the troupe had through the centuries. Constructed in 1890, it is a smaller version that usually moves faster and chases the people.

=== L'Àliga ===
The Àliga (Eagle) is the most distinguished element of the festivity. Constructed in 1756, her salt is the most choreographed one and differs from the rest because of the music, defined as one of the greatest pieces of Catalan popular music. This makes the Àliga the only troupe that makes the people be in silence until the second part of its salt, when the people start leaping around the figure.

=== Els Nans Vells ===
The Nans/Nanos Vells (Old Dwarfs). Built in 1853, they are four heads that represent male figures. Each one of them wears a red or blue coat and a tricorne. They also have castanets. They share their music with the giants. In 1890, because of their poor condition, the Nans Nous (New Dwarfs) were made. Fortunately, the City Council kept the old figures and restored them.

=== Els Gegants ===
The Gegants (Giants) are four figures with a height of 4 meters (13.12 ft) and an approximate weight of 100 kg (220.46 lbs). They are dressed like Saracens, as they represent defeated Muslim caudillos.

- The Gegants Vells (Old Giants) are a couple constructed in 1866. They are slightly lighter and smaller than the old ones. Because of that, they are the ones that participate in Passacarrers (Parades) and Tirabols.
- The Gegants Nous (New Giants) are the second couple, constructed in 1891. They are bigger and heavier than the new ones. Originally, their skin was white-colored, but it was colored black later.

=== Els Nans Nous ===
The Nans/Nanos Nous (New Dwarfs). They were made in 1890 to replace the old ones. Luckily, the latter were finally restored. They are two couples, one of them is young and the other is old, who dance one of the most well-known melodies from Patum around Catalonia.

=== Els Plens ===
The Plens (Full of fire ones), referenced since 1621, are the most well-known element of the festivity. They are the climax of Patum, and they only appear during nighttime. Their salt consists of a hundred demons, with nine fuets each. Each ple has a companion with one gerb, who guides it and indicates where to go. In total, an approximate number of a thousand fuets are lit and explode in each salt.

=== Tirabols ===
The Tirabols/Tirabol/Tirabou aren't a figure, but they are the final act of every celebration in Patum. Guites and Gegants move around the square in a "dance" that can last hours. The band plays four music pieces called Tirabols: El Tirabol, Vals-Jota, La Patumaire, and El Patumaire.

== Bruce Springsteen song ==
In 2016, to celebrate the 150th anniversary of the "old giants" (Gegants vells) and the 125th anniversary of the "new giants" (Gegants nous), the Bruce Springsteen song If I should fall behind, arranged by Sergi Cuenca, was danced by both couples of giants.

== Gallery ==
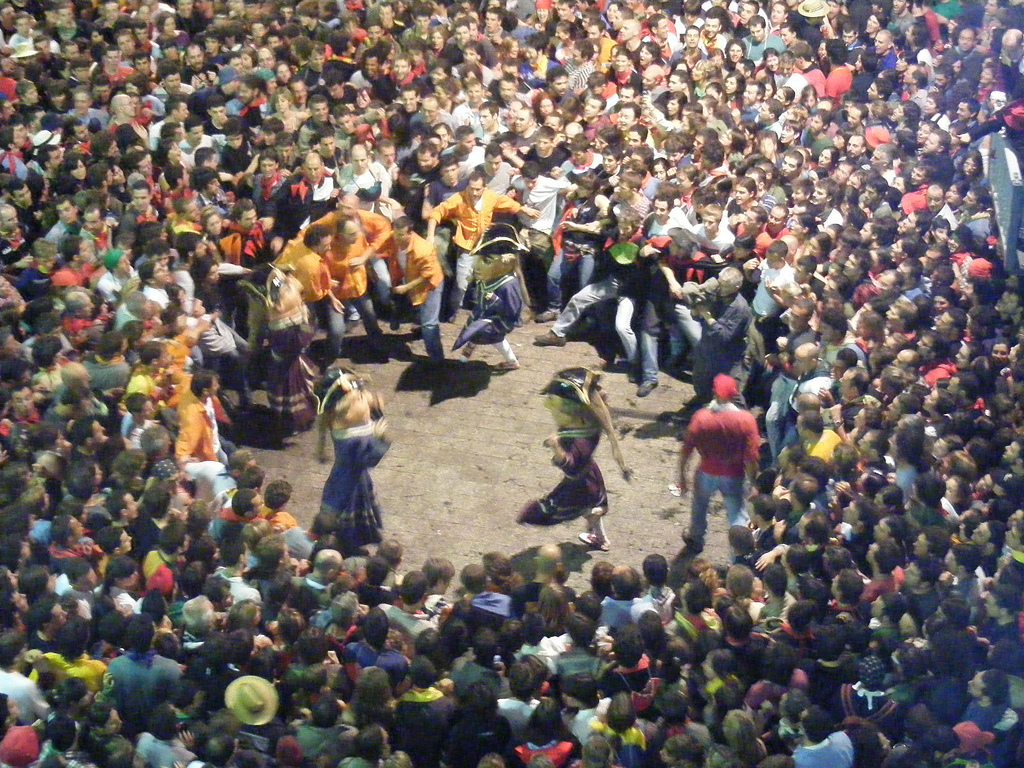
Salt de Nans Vells

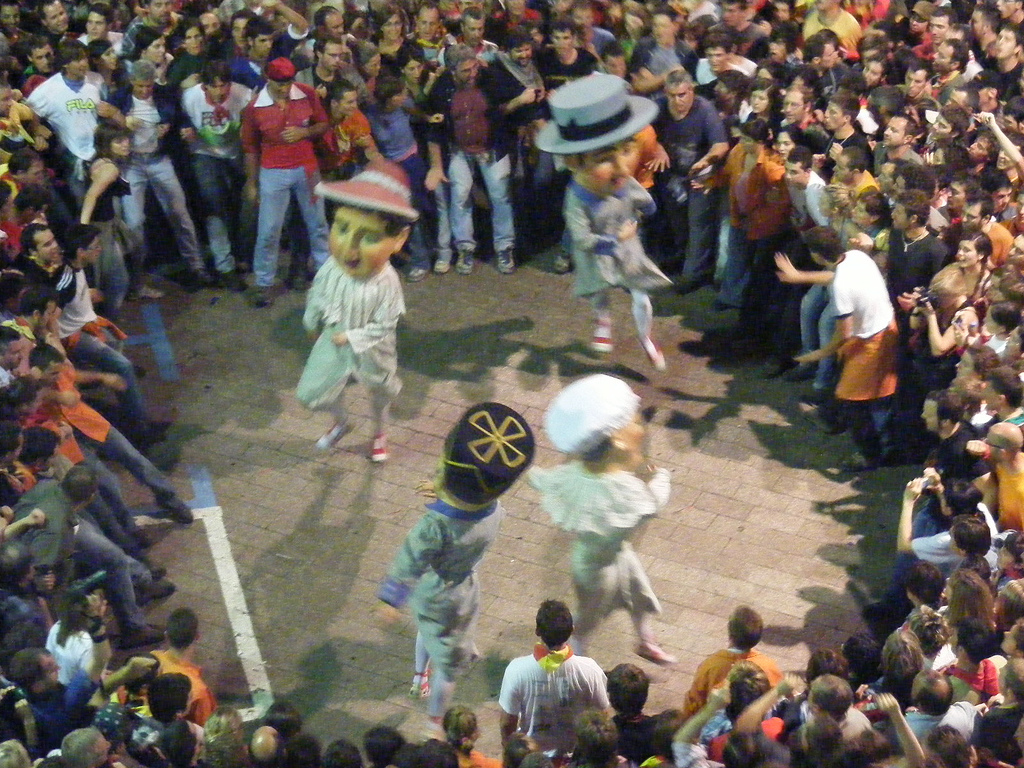
Salt de Nans Nous

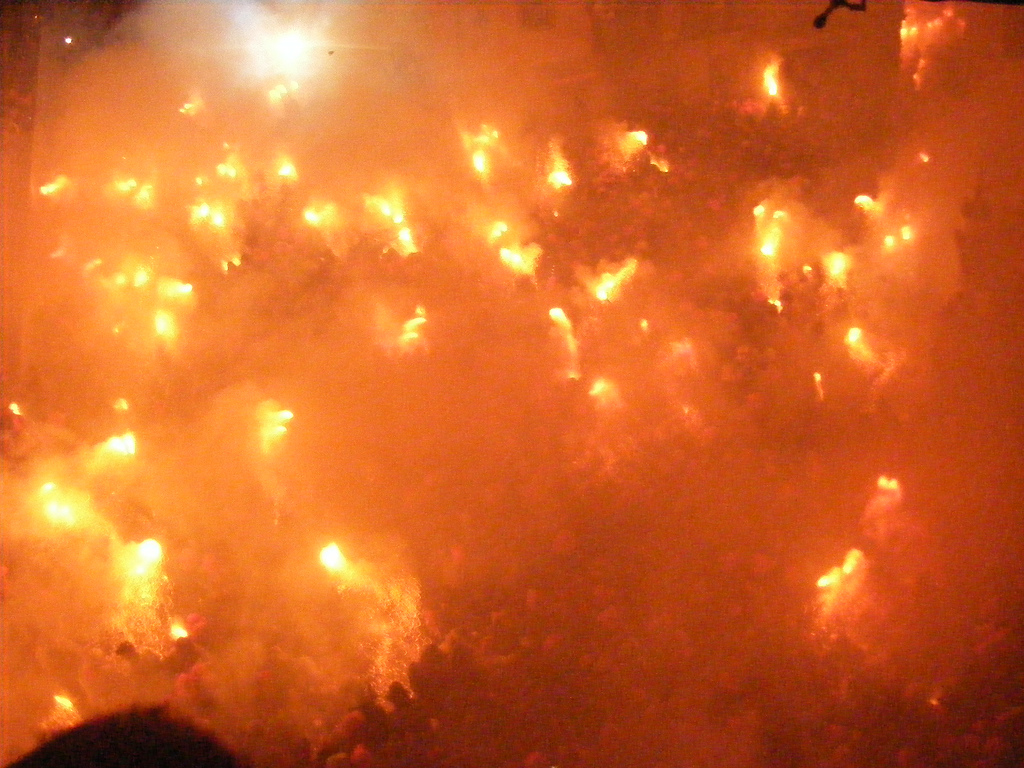
Salt de Plens

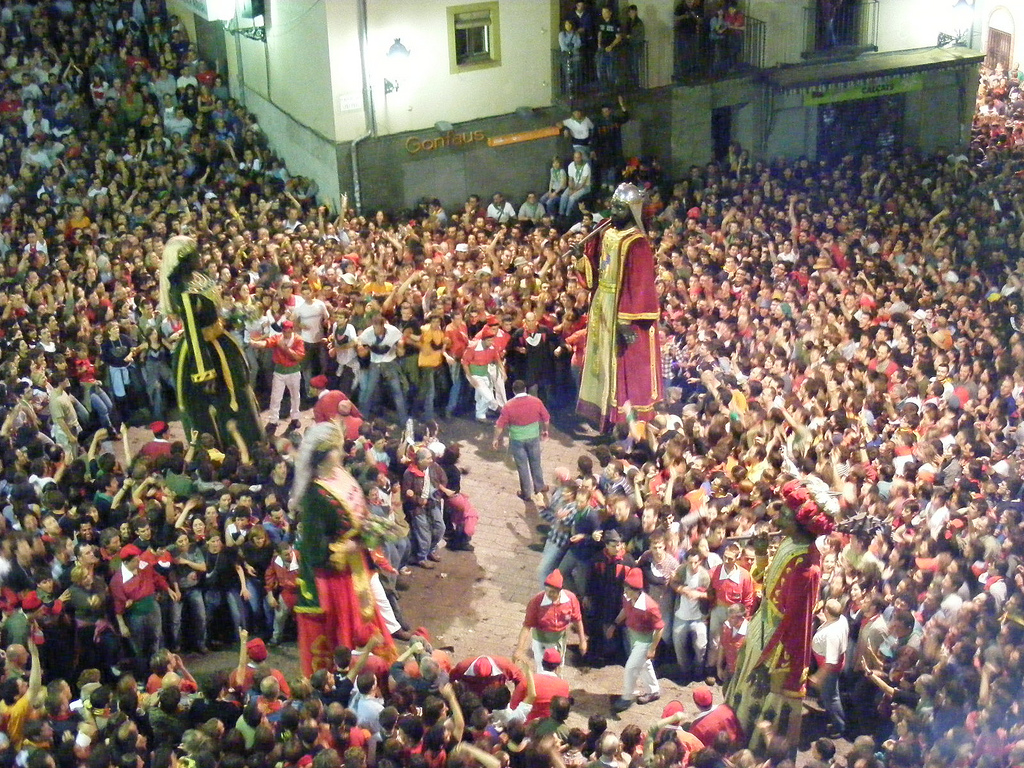
Salt de Gegants

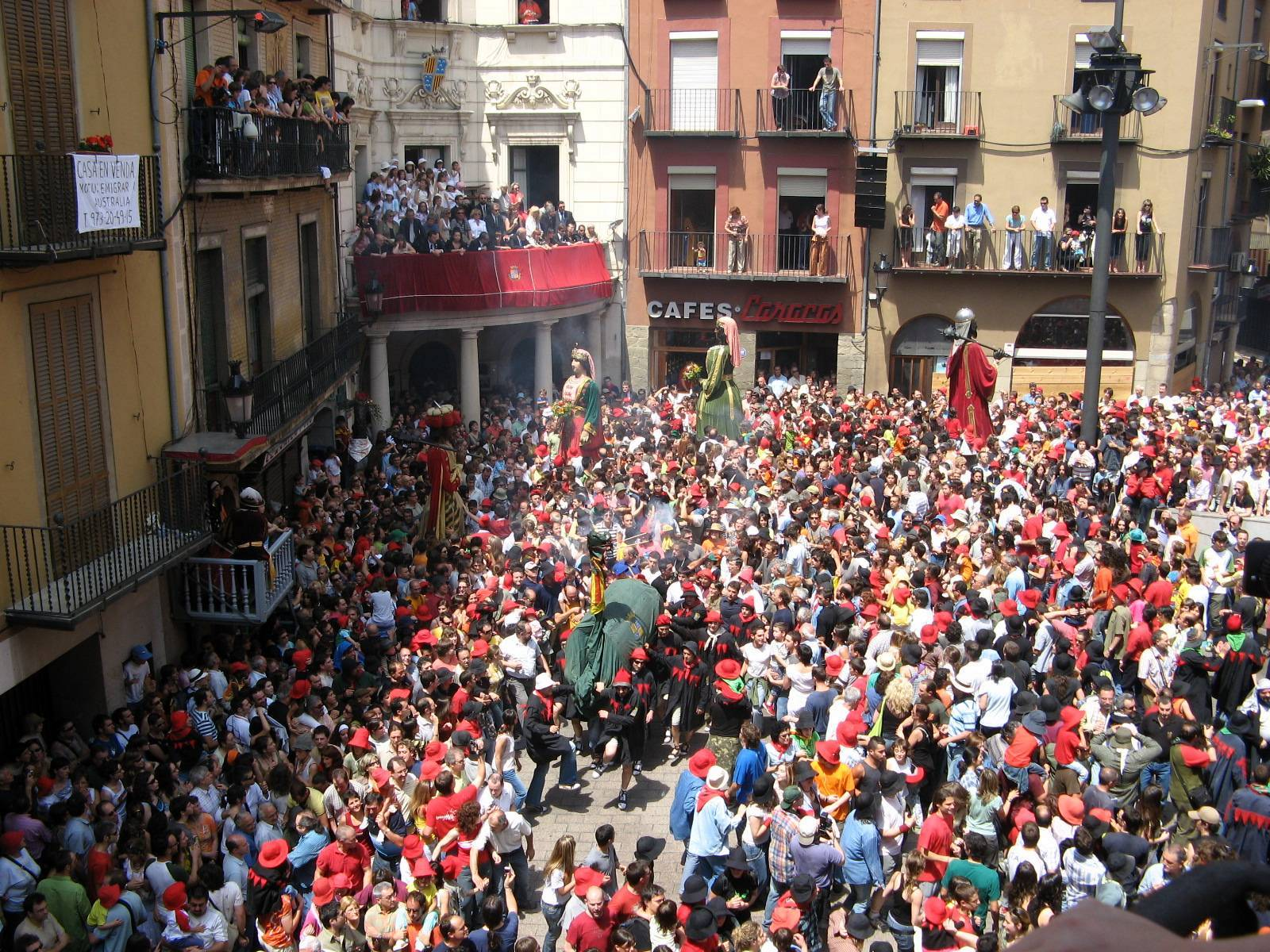
Tirabols (daytime)

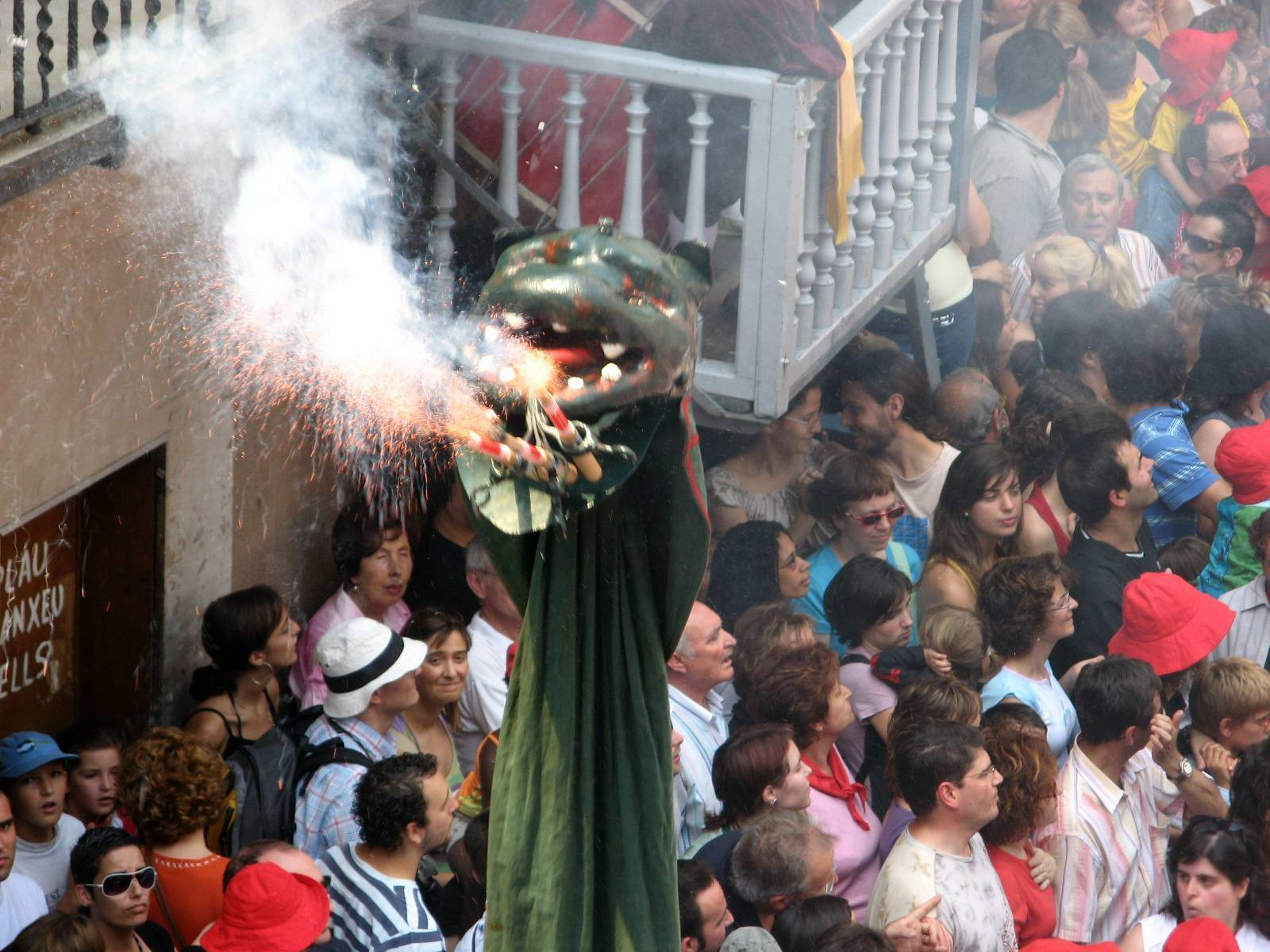
Guita Grossa

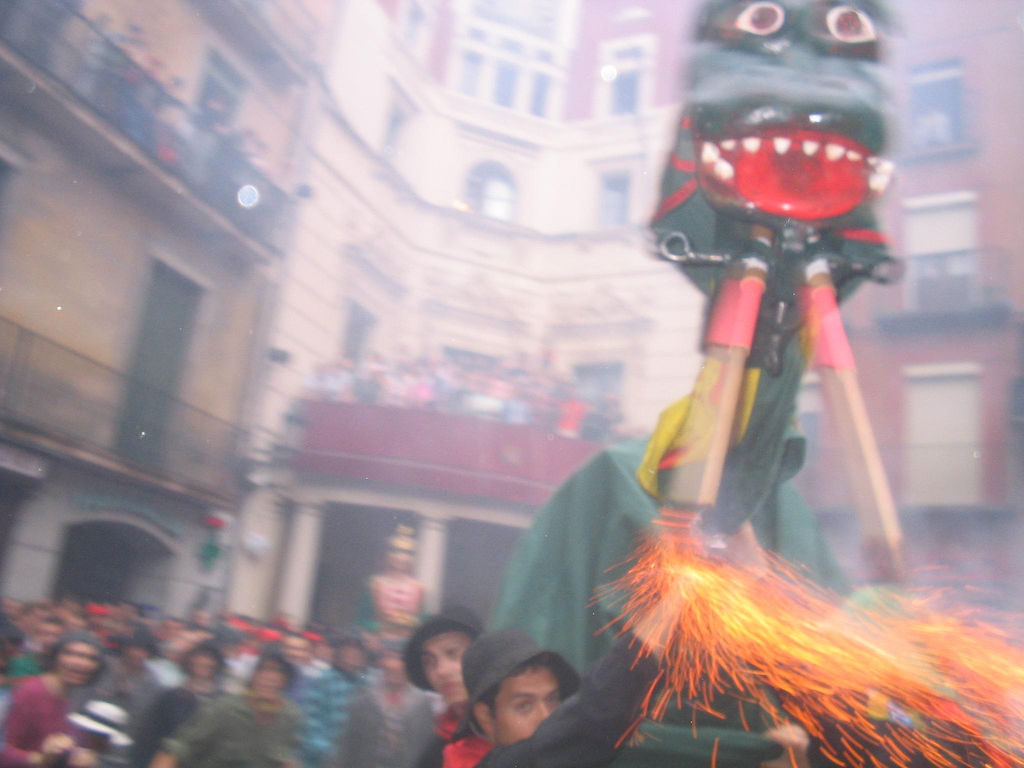
Guita Xica

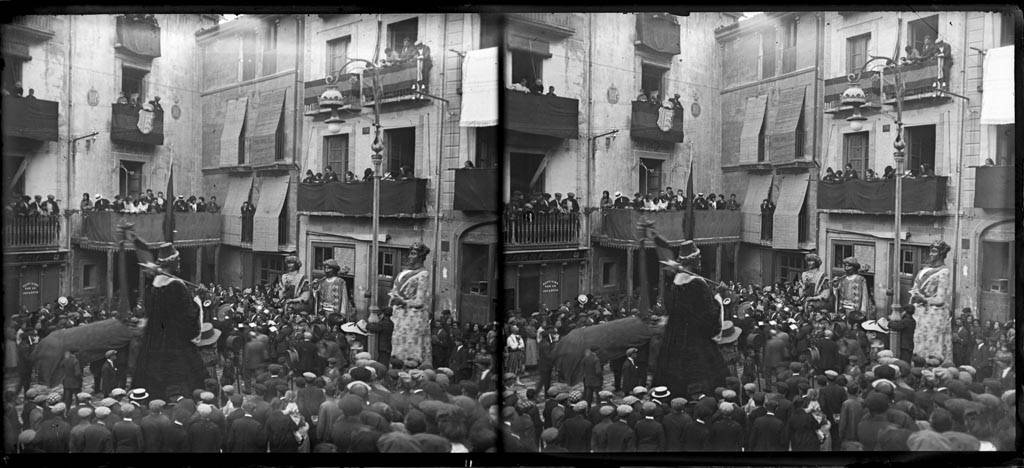
Entourage of the authorities. Patum de LluÏment (1924)

== See also ==
- La Guita Xica
- Correfoc
- Processional Giant
- Moros y Cristianos

== Bibliography ==
- Noyes, Dorothy (2003). Fire in the plaça : Catalan festival politics after Franco. Philadelphia: Univ. of Pennsylvania Press. ISBN 978-0-8122-1849-7.
