= La Guita Xica =

Legendary dragon of Catalonia

Head of "Big Guita" (Guita Grossa) —Berga, Patum festival of 2018.

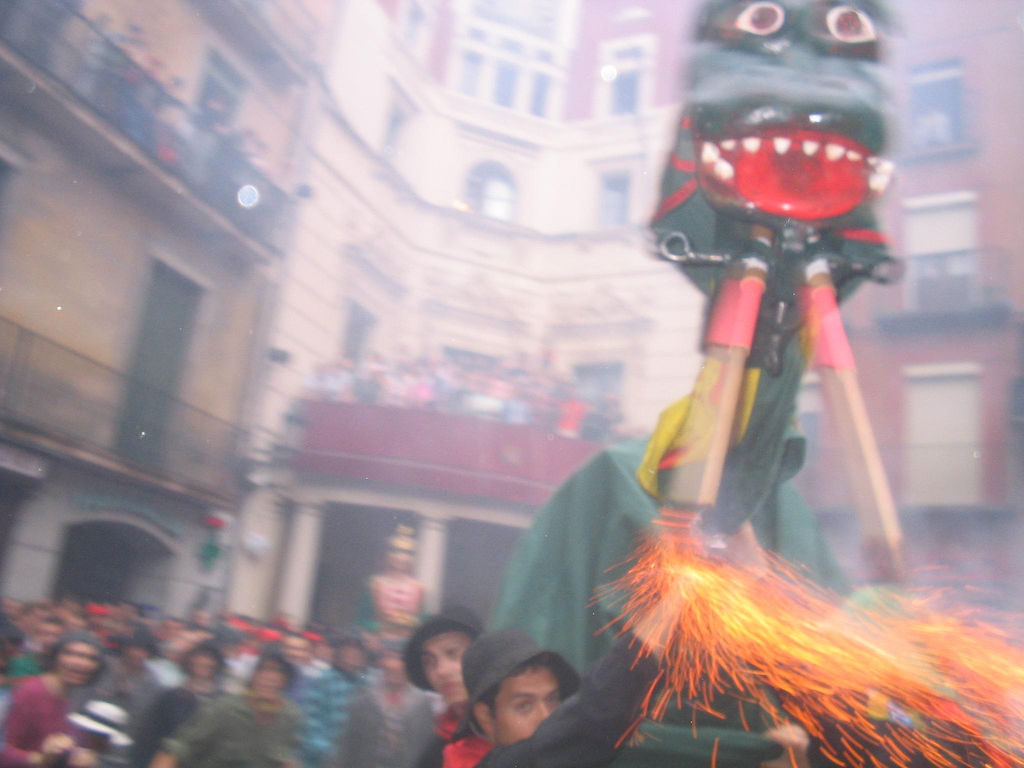
"LittleGuita" (Guita Xica) firing off fuets. —Patum de Berga, 2005

La Guita (Catalan pronunciation: [lə ˈɣitə], plural: Guites, lit. 'Kicker', by inference 'kicking mule') is a mule-dragon prop (or float) maneuvered through the streets for the Patum de Berga festival, which is the Corpus Christi procession held by the city of Berga.

== Nomenclature ==
The name Guita means ("Kicker"), and signified one of the mulasses (pl. of mulassa) or mule effigies employed commonly in Catalonian festivals. At the same time, it is classed as a local version under the broader category of tarasques (including the tarasque proper of Provence, and tarasca of parts of Spain), which are generally a hybrid of a dragon and some sort of livestock mammal. Back in the year 1790, the effigy was in fact described by Berga's city fathers as a "tarasque" to outside visitors.

In Berga, the mule-dragon effigy's name was changed from mulassa to "mulaguita", and just "Guita" by the 20th century. Local Berguedans tend to refer to the beast in the singular as Guita, even though two Guites have been employed in the city's festivals since the 1890s (Note: Or on the year 1890) because the second is merely a "double".

The two kinds are called Guita Grossa ("Big Guita") and Guita Xica (Catalan pronunciation: [ˈɣitə ˈʃikə], "Little Guita"). (Note: Noyes emphasizes the beast being genderless as well, which explains why the smaller type isn't glossed as the "Guita chica" or "Guita girl".) This smaller type is more maneuverable and swifter, thus also called Guita Boja ("Mad Guita").

== Ritual monster ==
The larger beast consists of a body cavity like a half-barrel (with wooden slats arranged around metal framing). It has wooden edges to be shouldered by its human carriers. Inside is a pilot to manipulate the long, wooden, mobile neck, attached to a holster that goes around the man's waist. A co-pilot behind him is yoked to a horizontal bar. The body and neck have a canvas skin painted green, with the city's coat of arms on both flanks.

The head is crafted from papier-mâché, (Note: A black face according to Rose, but recent photographs indicate a green face.) looking sort of like a mule, with a pair of ears and a short mane, though others say the head is "saurian" (lizard- or dinosaur-like), giving the monster a certain resemblance to the Loch Ness Monster together with its elongated neck. (Note: Gilmore citing Warner (1998) p. 116)

The long neck is characteristic of the "dragon" of this city, (Note: At the risk of mixing metaphors, Noyes calls the long neck giraffe-like.) the French tarasque is described as more squat-necked and armadillo-like, with its spiked carapace. The monster's gaping red mouth has fangs, or rather, it is gimmicked with three fuets (firecracker rocket devices).

Due to the long neck, the Big Guita (attaining 4 metres (13 ft) in height) can crane its head up to balconies and harass onlookers there, but most of the playful enactment is to threaten the crowds behind the barana (stone barrier), aiming the fire-spewing fuets or firecrackers at them. As it swings its head around, it jingles the bell suspended beneath its head.

The Small Guita lacks such a long neck as can reach the heights of balconies, but they too are equipped with the pyrotechnics, and due to the maneuverability, harass even beyond the barana barricade, and appearing in unexpected nooks and corners. The Guita Xica require only eight men to mobilize, the Gita Grossa require more.

The figurehead was already being used in performances in 1626, (Note: Attested in a 1626 ledger of the city treasurer (Clavari), which records that the Patum was held this year, and payments made to "als qui porten i ballen la mulassa [those who carried and danced the mulassa]".) and the city claims its origin goes back to the 14th century (though the name "Guites" only dates to the late 19th century, as aforementioned). The city believes the Guita has undergone little change since the early days, except for documented repairs to the jaws falling loose. The second, lesser mule-dragon (Guita Xica) was first introduced to the town square procession in 1890, though the prop had been in use in neighborhood procession of Corpus Christi before that time.

== Folklore ==
There is some vague lore concerning a hybrid beast in Catalonia going back to the twelfth century, and such mythical creatures have been termed generically as mulassas.

According to one origin tale that is told, the nearby city of Guardiola de Berguedà was under siege from Saracens; the Christians to use a bad-tempered mula, a mula guita which was laden with "rockets and exploding fires", and made the ignited beast charge into the Saracen camp in a night raid, driving the frightened enemies away. (Note: Harris, Max (2000) citing Noyes (1992), pp. 316–317, Amades, Folklore, I: 1307–1308, and Bartrina, E. (1985). El Castell de Guardiola, pp. 96–97)

== See also ==
- Patum de Berga
- Berga
- Cuélebre
