= Antonio Comellas y Cluet =

Spanish philosopher

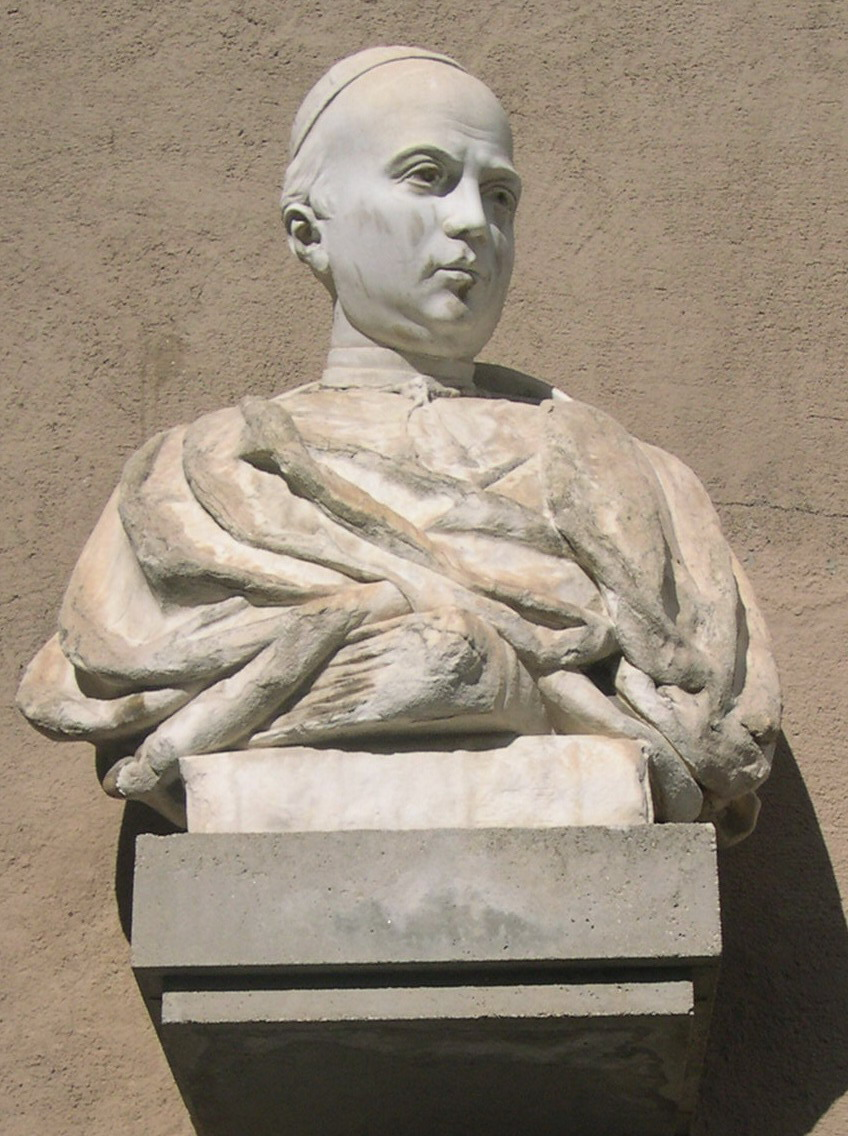
Antoni Comellas i

Antonio Comellas y Cluet (16 January 1832, in Berga – 3 June 1884, in Berga) was a philosopher.

Comellas studied philosophy and theology in Vic, and entered the diocesan seminary in Solsona, Lleida. After his ordination (17 May 1856) he continued to teach Latin at Solsona until 1862, when he was appointed professor of theology. During his stay there he published two pamphlets. The first was a discourse, delivered at the opening of the scholastic term, 1866–67, in which he tried to explain in a new manner the procession of the Holy Trinity, and the second a translation, accompanied by prologue and notes, of a work by Reginald Baumstark, Pensamientos de un protestante sobre la invitación del papa á la reconciliación con la Iglesia católica romana (Barcelona, 1869).

To be able to devote himself to his chosen line of work, a few months after the appearance of his philosophical work, he resigned his chair of theology in 1871, and withdrew to Berga. Before 1880 he published Demostración de la armonía entre la religión católica y la ciencia, a work of an apologetic nature, written to refute John William Draper's Conflict Between Science and Religion. In 1883 he wrote his philosophical work, Introducción á la filosofía, ó sea doctrina, sobre la dirección al ideal de la ciencia (Barcelona). Alberto Gómez Izquierdo, his biographer, says, that "as a philosopher, he [Comellas] was the only thinker who obeying the impulse of his scientific inquisitiveness, rather than the influence and stimulus of those about him, devoured all the most interesting philosophical literature of Europe of his time" and that "in his active mind the echoes of the spiritualism of the Catalan School and the first murmurs of the Thomistic revival reverberated". Some view him as one of the precursors of Neo-Scholasticism in Spain.
