= France 2 Foot =

French television programme

- Starring: Denis Balbir
- Country of origin: France

Production
- Running time: 60 minutes (excluding break for the 1pm news)

Original release
- Network: France 2
- Release: 29 July 2007 – 25 May 2008

France 2 Foot was a French football programme produced by France Télévisions for France 2. Similar in format to Téléfoot, its competitor on TF1, it provided French Division 1 and Division 2 highlights, as well as highlights of French matches in European competitions.

It was divided into two programmes, divided by the 1pm news: the first part from 12:15pm featured the highlights. The second part, after the news, was a debate, which, a few weeks after premiering, was replaced by an interview. The programme only lasted one season; initially, it failed to meet its audience targets, later, in February 2008, when it was announced that Canal+ would have exclusive rights over the highlights, its cancellation was announced for the end of the season.

== Background ==
Téléfoot carried the rights to Ligue 1 highlights from 1977 to 2007, when lost the rights to Ligue 1 football, after the Ligue de Football Professionnel awarded the rights to Canal+. In tandem with the decision to grant the paid channel total rights to Ligue 1, tenders were also being given to the Sunday magazine programme for the upcoming French football season. On 30 March 2007, the winner of the tender was France Télévisions, for the sum of €24,5 million. An LFP press release issued that day showed that France Télévisions' proposal was better than TF1's, in both cost and quality, and a significantly higher financial offer adjusted to the contractual price. The programme was set to be divided in two, one from 12pm to 1pm, and the other between 1:15pm and 1:35pm in order to attract more viewers. Moreover, unlike Téléfoot which only covered Division 1, the upcoming programme would also cover Division 2 and French cups.

On 15 May, its team was being announced. It was speculated that its presenter would be a Canal+ defectee, Denis Balbir, Lionel Rosso or Cyril Linette. Two weeks later, Balbir was confirmed as its presenter. Patrice Duhamel, director of programming at France Télévisions, had high expectations for France 2 Foot, as France 2's ratings fell slightly during the 2006–2007 television season.

== On air ==
France 2 Foot made its first broadcast on 29 July 2007. Editor-in-chief Dennis Clopeau called the first part "the newscast of French football"; this part consisted of reports on every match, as well as reports on teams and players. Division 2 was given ten minutes of airtime. After the 1pm news, the second part consisted of a 20-minute debate where several journalists discussed a controversial topic related to football.

The first edition was viewed by 2,3 million viewers, or 22,3% of the viewing share according to Médiamétrie, whereas the debate was viewed by around 2,8 million viewers representing 23,4% of the share. The next week saw the beginning of the new Ligue 1 season and its ratings fell: the first part was viewed by 1,8 million viewers, while the debate fell to 1,6 million. TF1 was airing F1 à la Une before its coverage of the 2007 Hungarian Grand Prix, attracting close to three million viewers. The third edition on 12 August kept the first part above two million viewers, but the debate did not recover its missing audience. By comparison, Téléfoot in the previous season attracted an average audience of 2,8 million. The channel hoped that France 2 Foot would attract a 25% share, but failed to achieve it.

== Retooling ==
Before France 2 revealed its autumn line-up for 2007, a study showed that eight out of ten viewers who watched the second part of the programme did not watch the first. The team announced that it would separate the two parts. By 2 September, the programme's ratings had fallen to around 16% for the first part and 9% for the debate. Even without Ligue 1 highlights, its competitor Téléfoot still had higher ratings surpassing 30% share.

On 22 September, Guy Carlier announced that he would join France 2 Foot, where he would present a segment (Guy Carlier à la limite du hors-jeu) and take part in the debate-turned-talkshow. By early November, Cahiers du Football noted that the debate segment became a "bar chat", In January 2008, the same publication noted that it had a biased view of the crisis AS Saint-Étienne was facing. Other members of the team criticised Laurent Roussey's competence, whereas Balbir ironically congratulated him later in the edition. Sometimes, the programme did not even cover data relevant to the matches, as well as mismatches between cities and match dates.

== Ending and aftermath ==
On 7 February 2008, Ligue du Football Professionel announced the tenders for the upcoming season. This time, Canal+ and Orange presented themselves as winners; this also included the Sunday afternoon magazine, which was given to the pay-TV networks.

The final edition aired on 25 May 2008; from 1 June, the slot formerly occupied by the debate was given to 13h15, le dimanche, a political debate. Canal+ came up with an equivalent magazine, Canal Football Club, which even during its first season was still behind Téléfoot (still lacking access to Ligue 1 highlights, as they were with Canal+); as for Balbir, he was hired by Orange, the other rights holder, to provide commentary for Ligue 1 matches broadcast by the Orange Foot channel; as of 2012 he was with M6.

== Theme ==
The theme was composed by Pascal Obispo, based on the song Zinédine, using the chant "Supporters, supporters, c'est le moment de chanter".
