= Free Software Street =

Street in Berga, Spain

Coordinates: 42.0968°N 1.8406°E

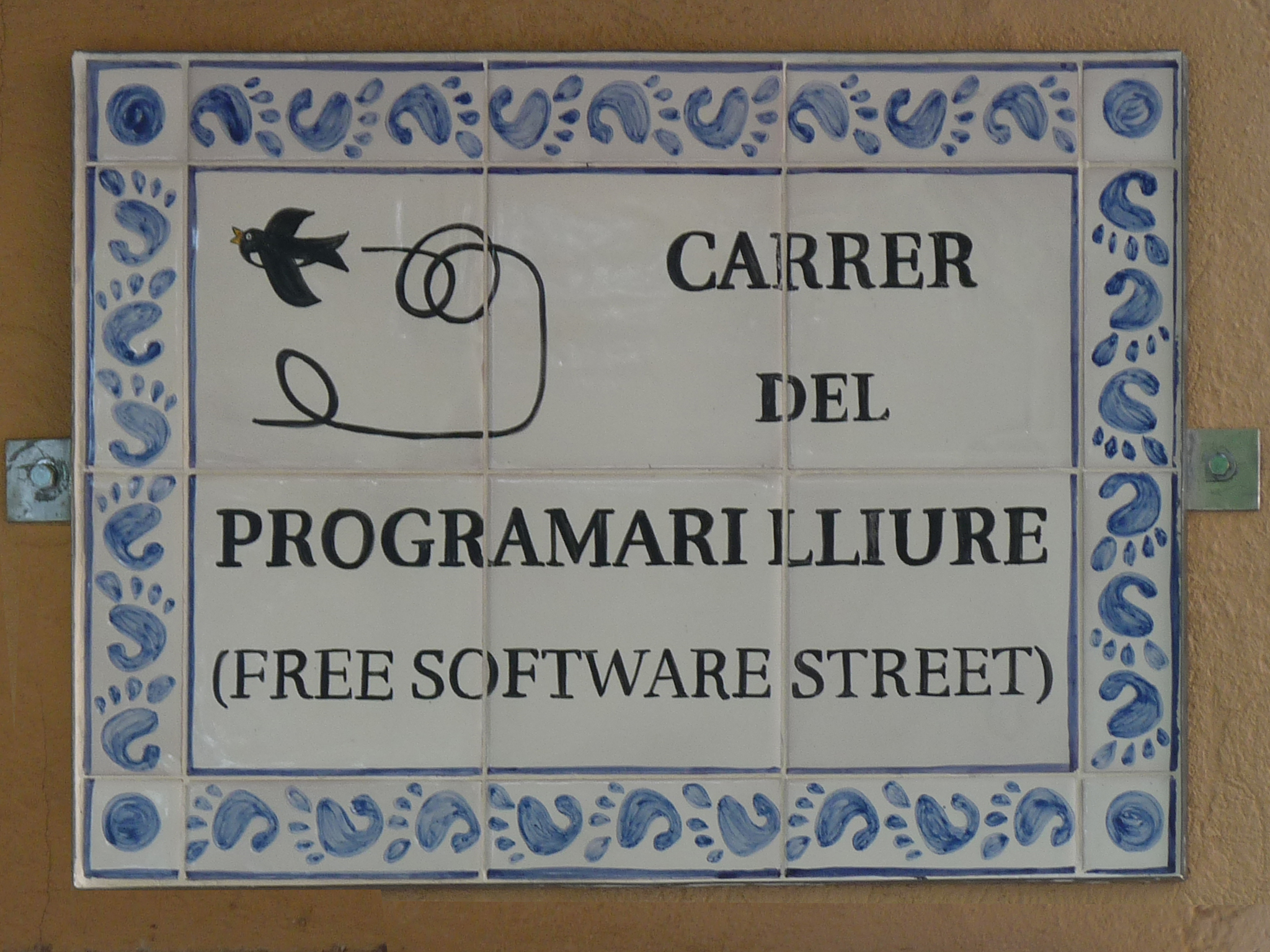
Street-name plaque, with the GNOME software logo repeated around the border

Free Software Street (Catalan: Carrer del Programari Lliure) is a street in the town of Berga in Catalonia, Spain. It is the first street in the world dedicated to the free software movement. It was officially opened on 3 July 2010.

The street is about 300 metres (980 feet) long and is located in a newly redeveloped area known as Pla de l'Alemany in the southwestern part of town. It is a mixed-use street, with a large hotel (the Berga Park), a school, a police station, some offices, a parkland, and some undeveloped plots.

== History ==
In June 2009, Albert Molina, Xavier Gassó and Abel Parera from Berga Telecentre organized the first Free Software Conferences to be held in town. After the conference, they noted the possibility of naming a street in honor of free software so that they applied for it to the Berga Town Council.

In January 2010, the second edition of the Free Software Conferences was being organized and it was decided to invite the Free Software Foundation founder Richard Stallman to participate in the planned events, including the naming ceremony of the street. At the same time, the contacts with the politicians from the town council were being successfully concluded. On 10 June, the renaming of the street as "Carrer del Programari Lliure" ("Free Software Street") was officially approved during a plenary session at the town hall with 14 votes in favor and 2 abstentions.

On 3 July 2010 at 20:00 CET (19:00 UTC), the Mayor of Berga Juli Gendrau and Richard Stallman finally inaugurated the street.
