= Christian Jeanpierre =

French sports journalist (born 1965)

- Born: 9 April 1965 (age 61); Le Puy-en-Velay, France
- Career
- Show: Téléfoot
- Network: Europe 1; TF1; Canal+
- Country: France

Christian Jeanpierre (also spelt Jean-Pierre, born 9 April 1965) is a French sports journalist who has worked for French television channels Canal+ and TF1, as well as radio station Europe 1. Jeanpierre presented TF1's football programme, Téléfoot, in 2004, and from 2008 to 2018.

== Personal life ==
Jeanpierre was born in Le Puy-en-Velay, Haute-Loire, and grew up in Toulouse. His grandparents were farmers. He studied at the Journalists Training Center in Montpellier. Jeanpierre is a supporter of Toulouse FC, and rugby union team Stade Toulousain. He is an amateur drummer, and plays music with Jean-Jacques Goldman.

== Career ==
Jeanpierre's first journalistic work was for the La Dépêche du Midi whilst he was providing humanitarian aid in Mali. In 1987, he began working for the magazine ça m'intéresse. In 1988, he began working for broadcaster TF1 as an intern. At TF1, he then became a reporter, and then a columnist. Jeanpierre covered the Rugby World Cups between 1995 and 2019. Jeanpierre is nicknamed "Monsieur foot" ("Mr Football").

Between 2003 and 2008, Jeanpierre worked for French radio station Europe 1 in their sports department. He specialised in football commentary. After Thierry Roland's departure from TF1 football programme Téléfoot in 2004, Jeanpierre hosted the show alongside Nathalie Renoux. In January 2005, they were replaced by Thierry Gilardi. After the death of Gilardi in 2008, Christian Jeanpierre returned as Téléfoot presenter. His first programme was dedicated to Gilardi. Co-presenters alongside Jeanpierre included Frédéric Calenge and Charlotte Namura, and Bixente Lizarazu made some host appearances on the show. He covered every France international football game between 2008 and early 2016, and is remembered for his commentary of France's defeat to hosts South Africa at the 2010 FIFA World Cup. Grégoire Margotton was chosen ahead of Jeanpierre to present Téléfoot's coverage of France matches at UEFA Euro 2016, after Margotton moved from Canal+ to TF1. Jeanpierre had presented Téléfoot's coverage of the 2008 and 2012 tournaments, and continued to cover other matches at Euro 2016, alongside former A.S. Roma coach Rudi Garcia. He commentated on seven matches, including England against Slovakia, and also interviewed French manager Didier Deschamps two days after France's first match of the tournament against Romania. After the 2018 FIFA World Cup, Jeanpierre was replaced by Margotton as the main presenter of Téléfoot. Jeanpierre was then demoted to only covering minor matches. He left TF1 in 2020; his last broadcast was Les Enfoirés, les secrets de une concert on 14 March. He later worked on high frequency microphones used by FIFA and UEFA. In 2021, he was working with Canal+ on a programme about The Invincibles Arsenal team.

== Works ==
In 2015, Jeanpierre wrote a book Quarante-Huit Deux-Tiers (48 and two-thirds) about his interactions with famous people, including Arsène Wenger, Christian Califano, Lionel Messi, Kad Merad and Comte de Bouderbala. In 2021, Jeanpierre wrote a novel 2026, l'année où le football deviendra américain (2026, the year when football becomes America).

- Jeanpierre, Christian, Quarante-Huit Deux-Tiers (48 and two-thirds), Les Arènes, 2015 ISBN 978-2352044604 (in French)
- Hourcade, Bertrand, Jeanpierre, Christian, Sorry, good game ! : Le dico bilingue du rugby, La Maison du Dictionnaire, 2019 ISBN 978-2856083550 (dual language English and French)
- Jeanpierre, Christian, 2026, l'année où le football deviendra américain (2026, the year when football becomes America), Solar, 2021, ISBN 226317379X
