= Ethnographic Museum of Ripoll =

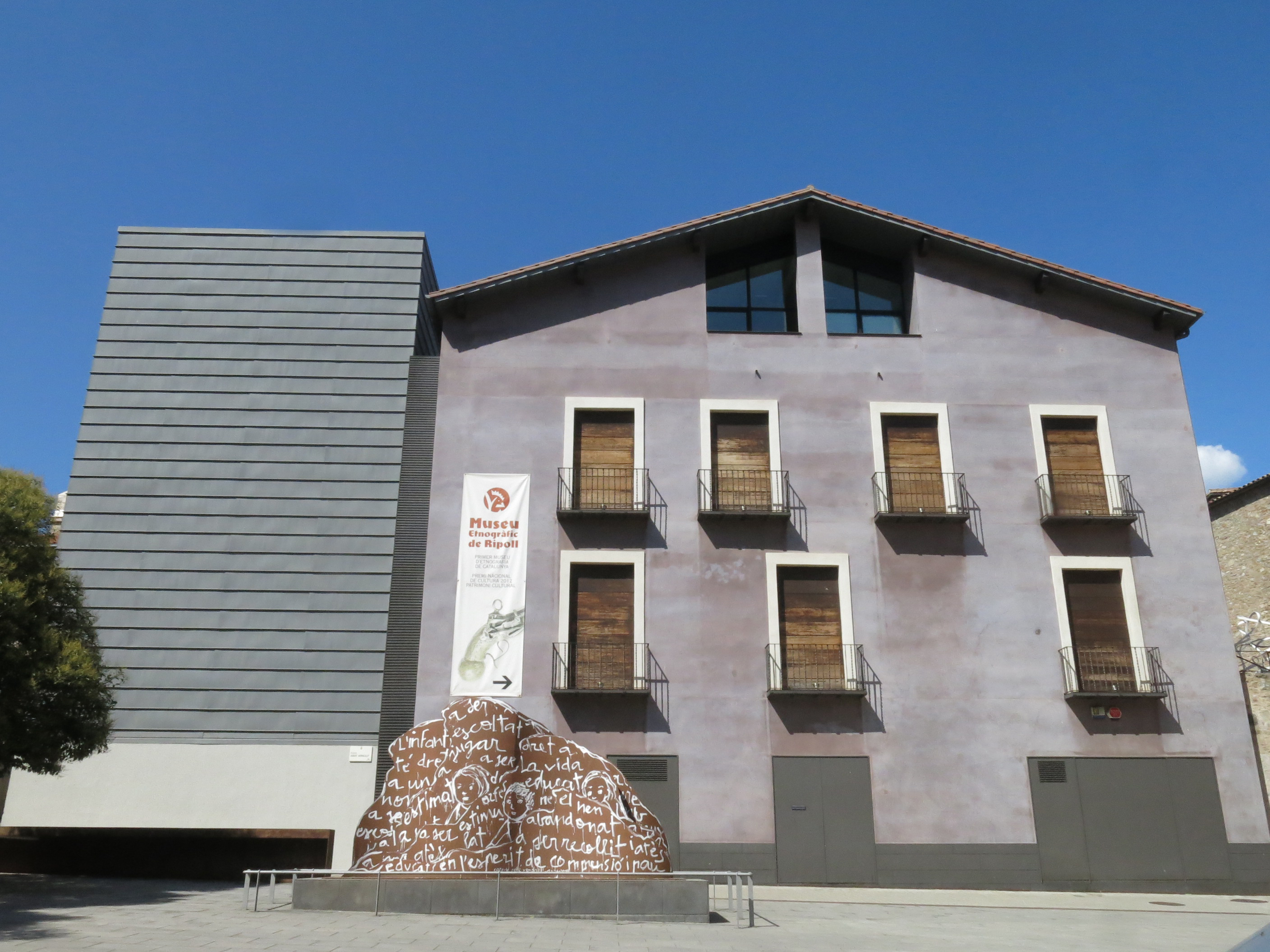

- Location within Province of Girona
- Established: 1928
- Location: Plaça de l'Abat Oliba, Ripoll, Girona, Spain
- Coordinates: 42°12′04.2″N 2°11′22.1″E
- Type: Ethnographic Museum
- Website: www.museuderipoll.org

The Ethnographic Museum of Ripoll is a museum in the city of Ripoll, province of Girona in Catalonia.

In 1929 the Archive of Folk Museum Ripoll was founded in the attic of the old church of Sant Pere, the first Catalan museum dedicated to ethnography. Over the last seventy years it has continuously collected, preserved, studied and promoted the heritage of the local region.

The result is the Ethnographic Museum of Ripoll, and after ten years of refurbishments it opens its doors again to continue enriching its collection and once again display its legacy. The exhibitions can help us understand local society through its material and non-material culture, which include collections relating to shepherds, farmers, craftsmen, religion, and the Catalan forge that produced wrought iron and firearms for the Ripoll region.

The new building, opened in March 2011, invites adults and children to take a tour of the recent past and the identity of the region, as well as a way of living and feeling.
