= Jean-Michel Larqué =

French footballer (born 1947)

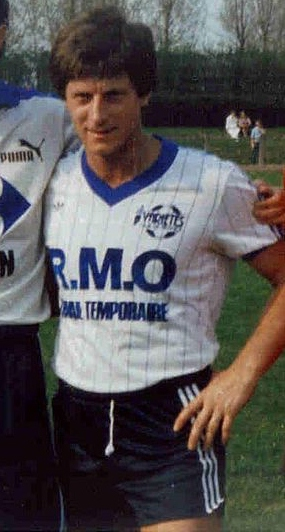
- Larqué with RC Paris in 1982

Personal information
- Full name: Jean-Michel Larqué
- Date of birth: 8 September 1947 (age 79)
- Place of birth: Bizanos, Pyrénées-Atlantiques, France
- Height: 1.73 m (5 ft 8 in)
- Position: Midfielder

Senior career*
Years	Team	Apps	(Gls)
1965	JAB Pau		
1965–1977	Saint-Étienne	321	(78)
1977–1979	Paris Saint-Germain	22	(0)
1981–1982	RC Paris		
Total		343	(78)

International career
1969–1976	France	14	(2)

Managerial career
- 1977–1978: Paris Saint-Germain
- 1981–1982: RC Paris
- * Club domestic league appearances and goals

Jean-Michel Larqué (born 8 September 1947) is a French former professional footballer, and now a sports journalist. A midfielder, he spent most of his career with Saint-Étienne. He has also been player-coach of RC Paris, his only experience as head-coach.

== Career ==
Larqué was born in Bizanos, Pyrénées-Atlantiques. As a player, Larqué played as a midfielder, and was one of the most important players for Saint-Étienne in the 1960s and 70s where he won all his titles. He finished his playing career in Paris with Paris Saint-Germain and RC Paris.

After having retired as a player, he became a football journalist: redactor for Onze Mondial magazine, but also on the radio Radio Monte Carlo with his programme, Larqué foot and on TV where he is a commentator. Between 1980 and 1984 he commented football matches on Antenne 2 and between 1985 and 2005 on TF1 with Thierry Roland. With the departure of Thierry Roland for M6, TF1 chose Thierry Gilardi (died on 25 March 2008) of Canal + to comment with Larqué. His style is notable for his constant repetition of the same phrase. In 1983, he also created training schools for young footballers from 7 to 19 where came Florent Malouda, Bruno Cheyrou, Benoît Cheyrou and Fabrice Fernandes.

== Honours ==
Saint-Étienne

- Division 1: 1966–67, 1967–68, 1968–69, 1969–70, 1973–74, 1974–75, 1975–76
- Coupe de France: 1969–70, 1973–74, 1974–75

Orders

- Knight of the Legion of Honour: 1999
