= Eudald Domènech i Riera =

Spanish businessperson

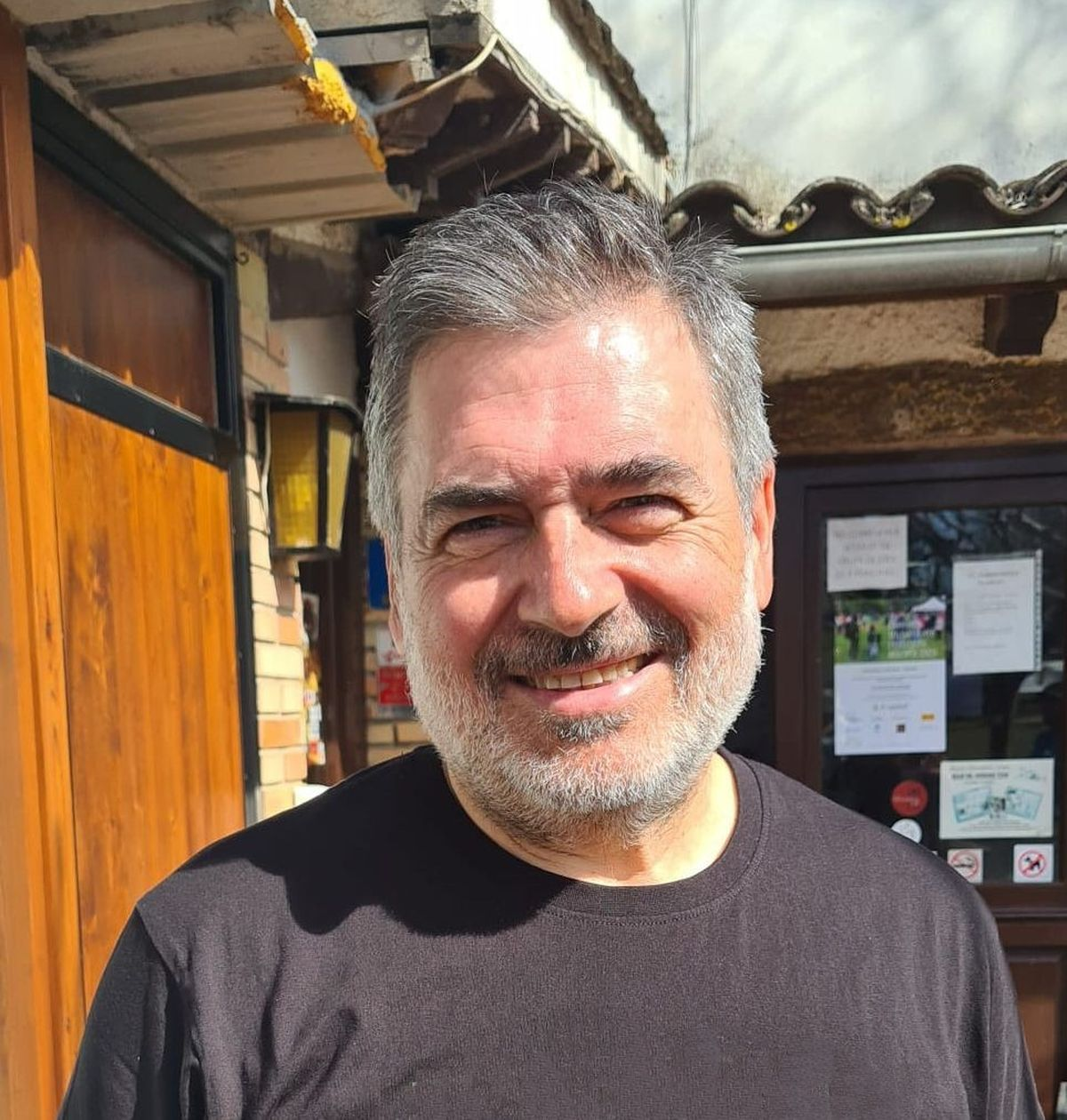

Eudald Domènech Riera, (Ripoll, 1962), is a Spanish businessman linked to new technologies and the Internet, considered "the first businessman in Spain on the Internet." He was the founder of Servicom, the first private company to offer internet connection and internet services all over Spain. He was also co-founder of World Online, founder of Telépolis, co-founder of InOutTV, SincroGuiaTV and Total Channel, among other startups.

== Biography ==
Domènech trained as a draftsman, although at the age of nineteen he set up a nightclub in his native Ripoll, with a radio station installed in the DJ booth, through which he broadcast commercial advertisements interspersed between the musical pieces. Since then he decided to dedicate himself to advertising and marketing, and in 1993 he started an advertising business in Vich . That same year he founded Servicom, a pioneering internet company in Spain and where he served as executive director until 1995, when he left the company. Since then he has been involved in important corporate operations in the field of telecommunications, although he also suffered various failures. The journalist Nuria Almiron wrote in her book Cibermillonarios (2000): "He has gone bankrupt several times, but he has refloated from all of them."

== Founded companies ==
A company with the name Servicom (since purchased by Retevisión) was founded by Eudald Domènech in 1993, with just over 10 million pesetas. It used to distribute several databases of general information produced by external institutions. In the beginning, the environment supported by Alberto Lozano, worked with FirstClass only for Macintosh, although it was later adapted for IBM-PC and offered selections from the newspapers El Mundo and El Periódico de Catalunya, and magazines such as El Temps . Signing up for the service cost 3220 pta, the connection kit: 4590 pta, and the basic monthly fee: 1380 pta.

Considered the first "independent" internet service in Spain, Goya, somewhat earlier, could not be considered independent or private, since it was created by the administration limited to the university environment and RedesTv did not provide internet access until 1999. After many drawbacks, Servicom became the second internet access provider that tens of thousands of Spanish users met.

After Servicom, in January 1996 Domènech created a new internet portal and the first virtual community in Spain, Telepolis. When EresMas wanted to open its market online, and paid about 14.000 million pesetas for Telépolis, in Retevisión shares. probably the last major independent portal left on the Spanish Internet.

World Online was a European Internet service provider (ISP) co-founded by Eudald Domènech, from the late 1990s with the dotcom bubble .

InOutTV is a company founded by Eudald Domènech in 2000, which allowed you to watch Spanish television channels. In 2012 InOutTV was liquidated, with an accumulated liability of seven million euros.

SincroGuiaTV is an application launched by InOutTV (Eudald Domènech) to consult the programming of Spanish television channels "in Spain" (analog and DTT).

Total Channel is a service with twelve pay channels in Spanish territory, co-founded by Eudald Domènech. In 2013 he sold the company to Mediapro .

== Work ==
- Negocios 3.0: mitos y realidades de internet y la nueva economía (Ediciones B, 2011). Domènech, Eudald; Almiron, Nuria.
