= Jean Raynal =

French sports journalist

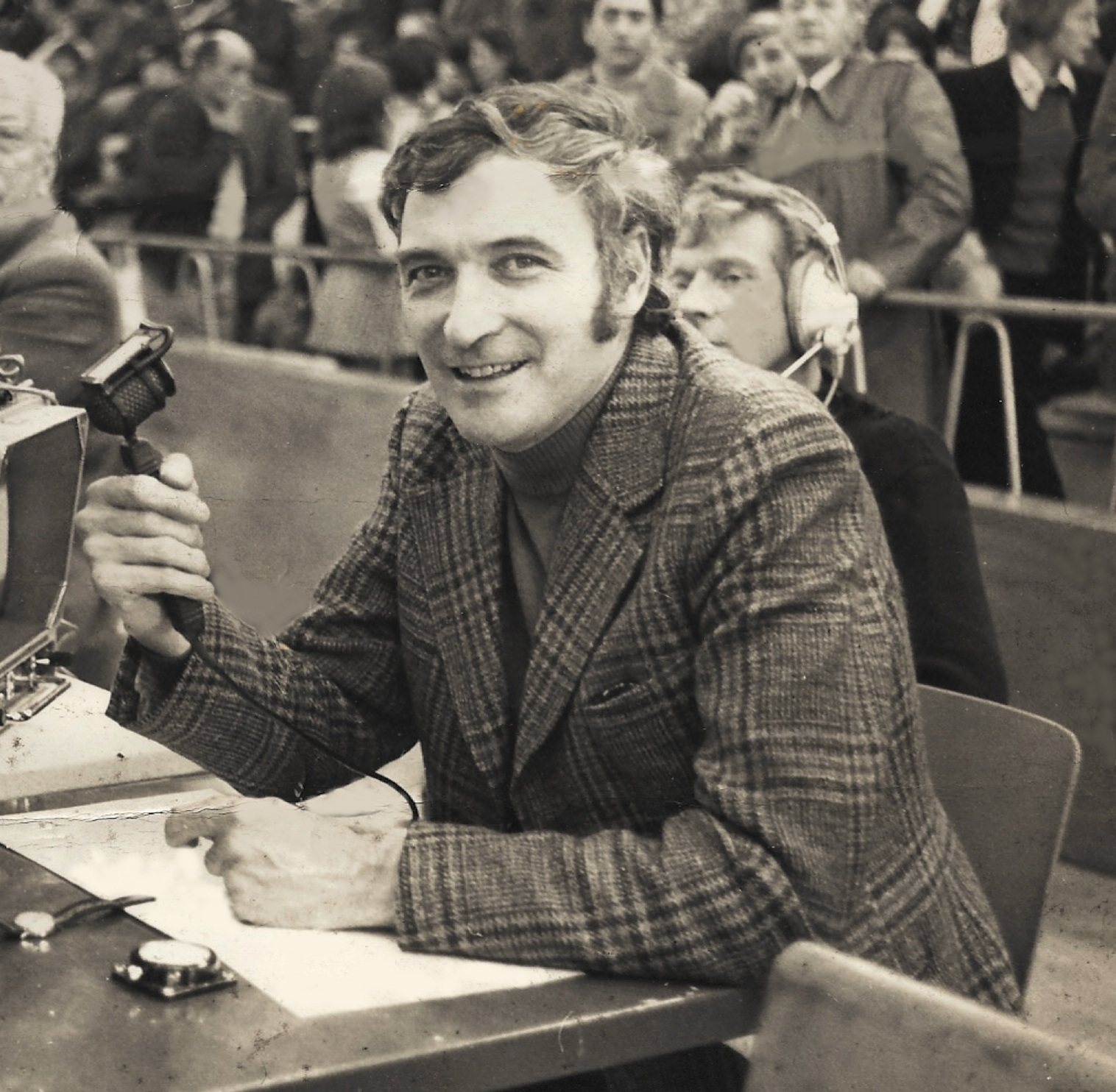
- Jean Raynal commentating in 1970
- Born: 18 August 1929; Massiac, Cantal, France
- Died: January 2015 (aged 85)
- Career
- Show: Téléfoot
- Network: Office de Radiodiffusion Télévision Française; TF1
- Country: France

Jean Raynal (18 August 1929 – January 2015) was a French sports journalist, who worked for Office de Radiodiffusion Télévision Française and TF1. He commentated on football, rugby, basketball, and the Olympic Games. He was nicknamed Monsieur Basket (Mr Basketball).

== Personal life ==
Raynal was born in Massiac, Cantal, France. He studied at the Centre de formation des journalistes in Paris.

== Career ==
Raynal began his work as a radio presenter in 1957. In 1968, Raynal became a television presenter on Office de Radiodiffusion Télévision Française, and was one of the first five members of the organisation's committee on objective journalism. From 1975 to 1988, Raynal worked for TF1.

Raynal commentated at five FIFA World Cups; he commentated at the 1978 FIFA World Cup alongside Pierre Cangioni. Between 1983 and 1984, Raynal presented one season of TF1's football programme Téléfoot. Aside from football, Raynal covered basketball in the 1970s and 1980s. Raynal was nicknamed "Monsieur Basket" (Mr Basketball), and in 1980, he wrote the book La Fabuleuse histoire du basket (The fabulous history of basketball). Raynal also covered 26 French Open tennis championships, and six Olympic Games. He commentated with Raoul Barrière at the 1978–79 French Rugby Union Championship final, where Narbonne beat Stade Bagnérais. Fellow sports journalist Didier Roustan said that Raynal was his inspiration.

== Works ==
- Raynal, Jean, Le volley-ball (Volleyball), 1977
- Raynal, Jean, La Fabuleuse histoire du basket (The fabulous history of basketball), 1980

== Death ==
Raynal died in 2015 at the age of 85.
