= Mediapro =

Spanish audiovisual group

Mediaproducción, S.L.U.

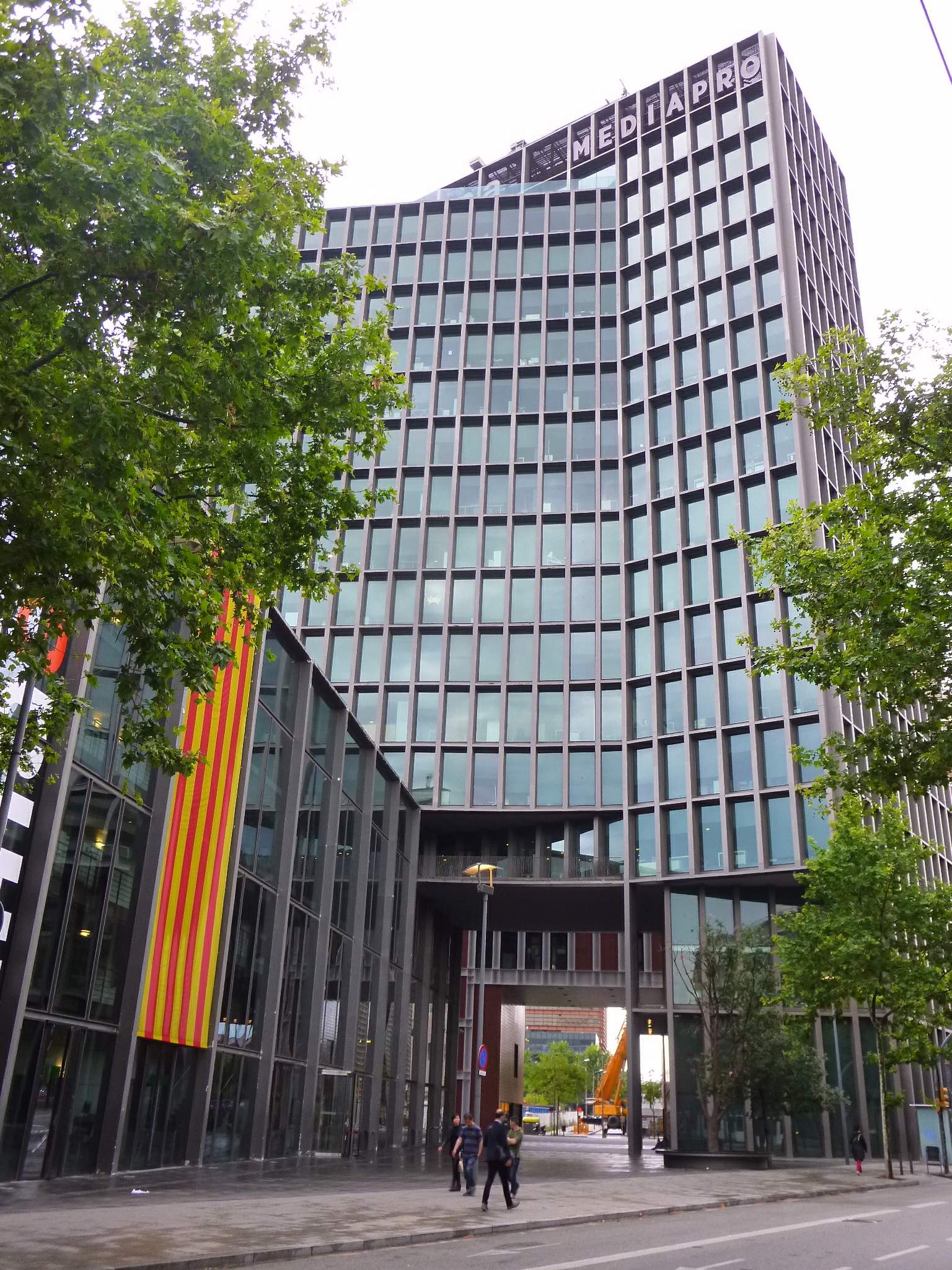
- Trade name: Mediapro Grup
- Type: Subsidiary
- Industry: Media rights management
- Founded: April 1994; 32 years ago
- Founder: Jaume Roures; Tatxo Benet; Gerard Romy
- Headquarters: Barcelona, Spain
- Area served: Spain, Portugal
- Key people: Laura Fernández Espeso (general manager)
- Revenue: ▲1.967 billion € (2018)
- Operating income: ▲91 million € (2013)
- Net income: ▲122 million € (2013)
- Number of employees: 8,219
- Parent: Imagina Media Audiovisual, S.L.
- Website: www.mediapro.tv

Mediaproducción, S.L.U., better known as Mediapro, is a multimedia communications group in Spain founded in April 1994 in Barcelona. The company is involved in film and television production.

The company holds branch offices in Madrid, Seville, Girona, Lisbon, Madeira, Rabat, Budapest, Miami, Buenos Aires, Santa Cruz de la Sierra, Rio de Janeiro, Porto, Qatar, Amsterdam and Tenerife.

Southwind, that maintains different teams and operation entities across Hong Kong, North America, Europe, and the United Kingdom is the majority shareholder. Minority stakes held by WPP and the founding partner.

== Operations ==
=== Canada ===
On 21 February 2019, Canadian Soccer Business (CSB) announced that Mediapro would serve as the exclusive media rightsholder of Canada Soccer, including rights to the Canadian Premier League, the Canadian Championship, and national team matches. In April, Mediapro announced OneSoccer, a subscription service that would carry this content.

On 25 January 2024, CSB withdrew media and broadcast rights from Mediapro and initiated legal action against the group, citing missed rights payments and insufficiently reach of sub-licensing agreements with linear television networks to broaden the reach of its content. Mediapro countered with arguments that CSB did not meet its own obligations, including expansion of the Canadian Premier League. CSB and Mediapro later reached a settlement, in which Mediapro would be allowed to back out of its contract with CSB at the end of 2024, and OneSoccer would be divested to a company controlled by one of CSB's chairmen.

=== France ===
On 29 May 2018, Ligue de Football Professionnel (LFP) announced that Mediapro had acquired four of the five main lots for media rights to Ligue 1 and Ligue 2 for 2020–21 through 2023–24 seasons. Mediapro partnered with TF1 Group to form a new channel known as Téléfoot to hold these rights. In December 2020, after missing two rights payments early in its first season (citing a desire to renegotiate the contract due to the financial impact of the COVID-19 pandemic), Mediapro and the LFP agreed to exit the contract.

=== Argentina ===
On 20 January 2022, CNDC ordered The Walt Disney Company to divest the Fox Sports television network from the acquisition of 21st Century Fox in order to get an approval from the government of Argentina. On 15 February 2022, Mediapro announced it would acquire Fox Sports Argentina from Disney. The sale was approved by the CNDC on 27 April 2022.

== See also ==
- Media Coach
- Eudald Domènech i Riera
