= Grégoire Margotton =

French sports journalist (born 1969)

- Born: 9 November 1969 (age 56); Lyon, France
- Career
- Show: Téléfoot
- Network: Canal+; TF1
- Country: France

Grégoire Margotton (born 9 November 1969) is a French sports journalist who has worked for French television channels Canal+ and TF1. Since 2018, he has been the main presenter of the TF1 football programme Téléfoot.

== Personal life ==
Margotton's father taught at Lumière University Lyon 2. He studied his Baccalauréat in Lyon, before moving to Liverpool, England as an Erasmus student.

== Career ==
Margotton studied journalism at Bietry school, which was named after French journalist Charles Bietry. In 1992, he started working for Canal+ as an intern. Margotten and Darren Tulett were the French language commentators on the Pro Evolution Soccer 2013 game. In 2014, Margotten started presenting La Data Room de Canal + (The Canal+ data room), a weekly short programme that looks into the statistics of football matches. In the same year, Margotten suggested that matches between Paris Saint-Germain and Marseille should become a derby match.

In 2016, Margotton moved from Canal+ to TF1, as he wanted to spend his weekends with his family rather than at football matches. (Note: Since 2007, rights to Ligue 1 football were held by Canal+. Téléfoot shows highlights of foreign matches, European club competitions, and international matches.) His first match for TF1 was the Téléfoot coverage of an international friendly between France and Cameroon. He was chosen ahead of Christian Jeanpierre to present Téléfoot's coverage of France matches at UEFA Euro 2016, and commentated alongside Bixente Lizarazu. In September 2017, Margotton began hosting Rendez-vous Sport, a two-minute summary programme about football results and players. Prior to the 2018 FIFA World Cup, Margotten and Nicolas Glimois hosted a documentary 98, secrets d'une victoire (98, secrets of a victory) about France's victory at the 1998 FIFA World Cup. After the 2018 World Cup, Margotten replaced Jeanpierre as the main presenter of Téléfoot. Margotten and Lizarazu commentated for the Téléfoot coverage of the 2019 FIFA Women's World Cup.

Aside from football, Margotton has commentated for TF1 on handball. He commentated on the 2017 Men's and Women's World Handball Championships, the 2018 Women's EHF Champions League, and the 2019 World Men's Handball Championship.

In 2019, Margotton appeared on a special edition of Qui veut gagner des millions ? to raise money for Notre-Dame de Paris following the fire there. Margotten and Alessandra Sublet won 24,000€.

== Awards ==
In 2013, Margotton was awarded the Lucarnes d'Or award for best French sports journalist. In 2017, he was voted the French public's favourite commentator in a French Football Federation poll.
