= Ripoll =

- Municipality
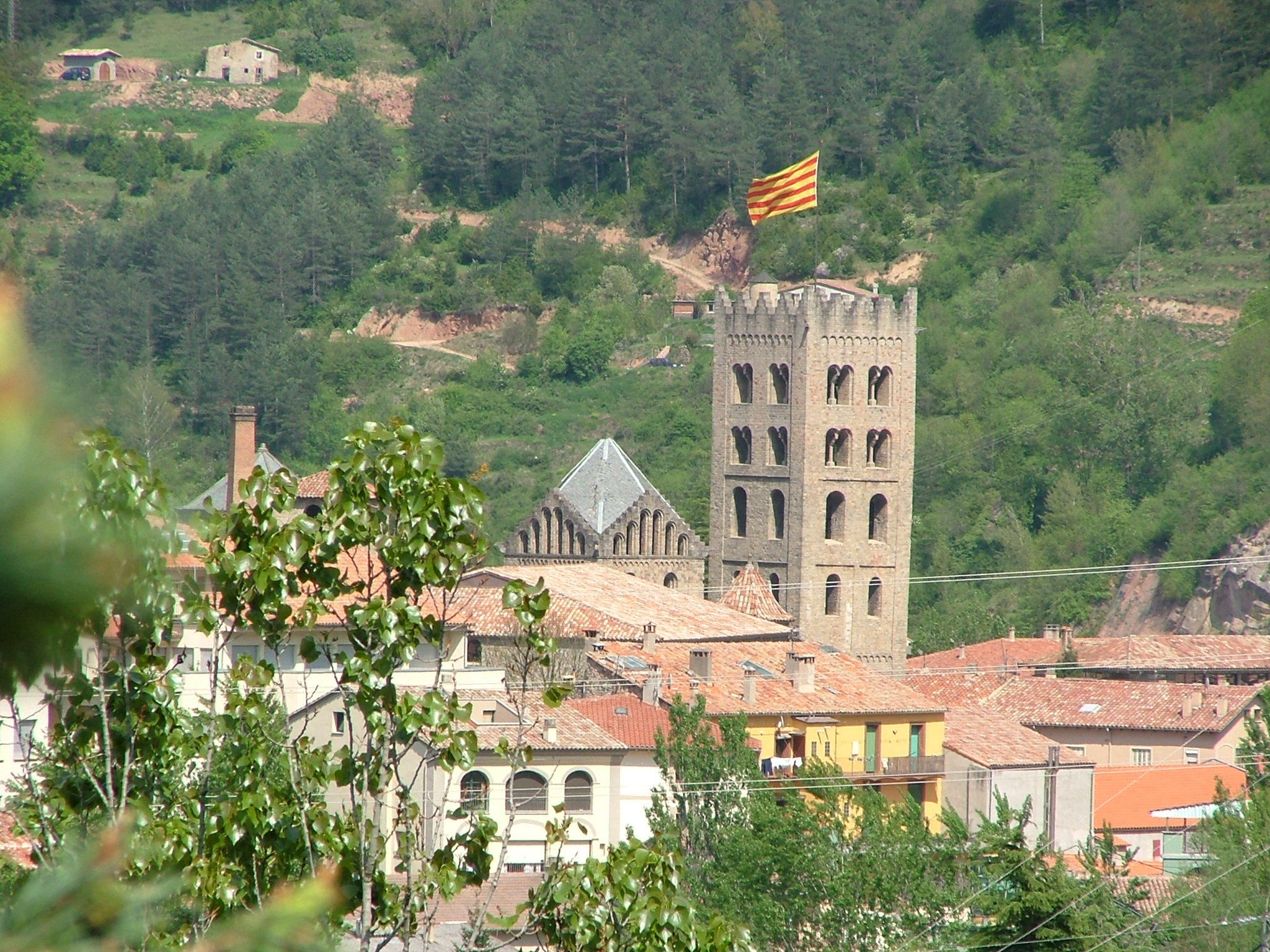

- Flag Coat of arms

- Location in Catalonia Ripoll (Catalonia) Ripoll (Spain)
- Coordinates: 42°12′2″N 2°11′34″E
- Country: Spain
- Community: Catalonia
- Province: Girona
- Comarca: Ripollès

Government
  - Mayor: Sílvia Orriols (2023) (AC)

Area
  - Total: 73.7 km^{2} (28.5 sq mi)
- Elevation: 691 m (2,267 ft)

Population (2025-01-01)
  - Total: 10,665
  - Density: 145/km^{2} (375/sq mi)
- Demonym: Ripollès
- Postal code: 17147
- Climate: Cfa
- Website: www.ripoll.cat

Ripoll (Catalan pronunciation: [riˈpoʎ]) is the capital of the comarca of Ripollès, in the province of Girona, Catalonia, Spain. It is located on the confluence of the Ter river and its tributary the Freser, next to the Pyrenees near the border with France. The population was 11,057 in 2009.

== History ==
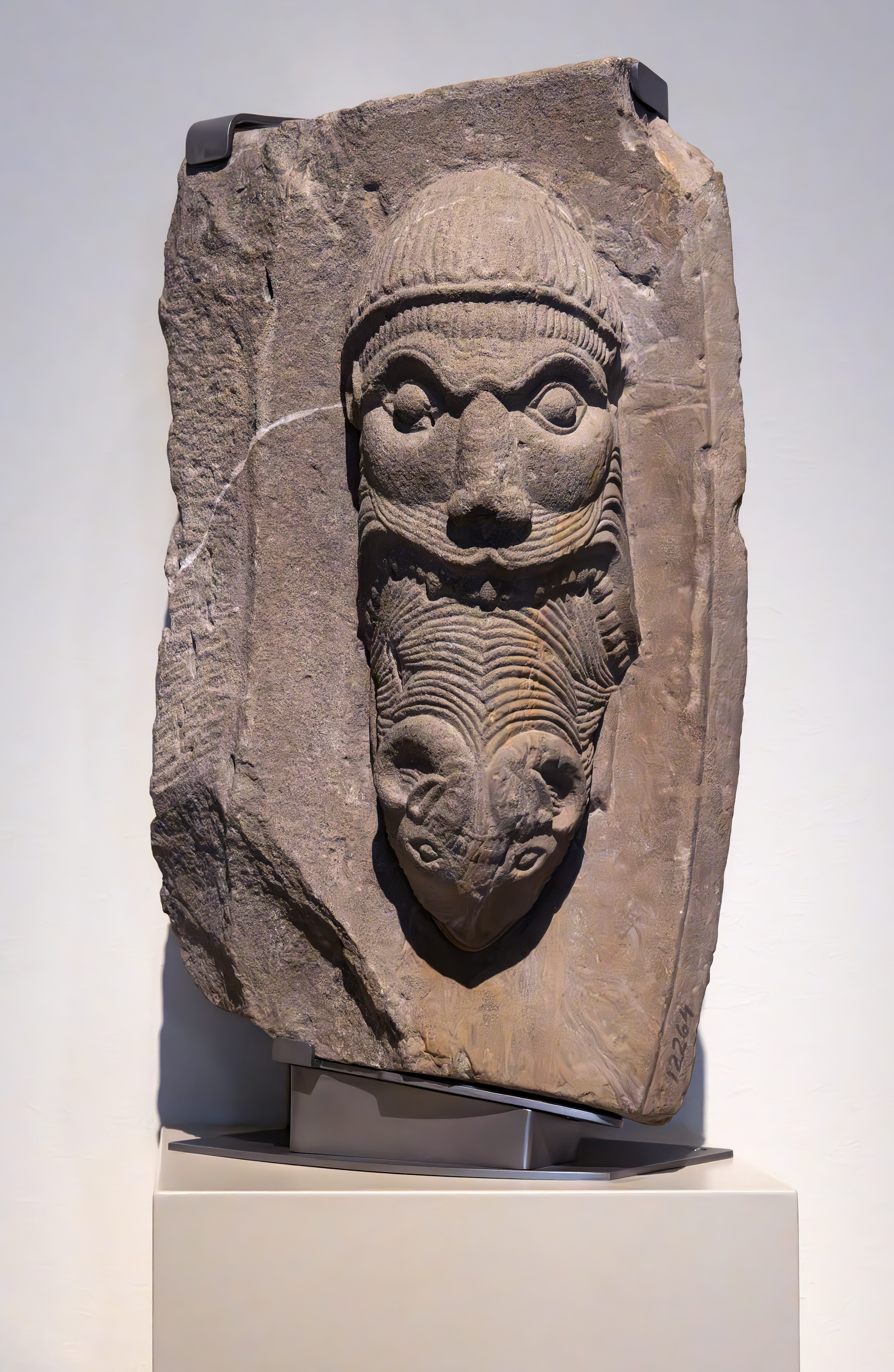
Dovella de Ripoll, Museu Nacional d'Art de Catalunya

The first traces of humans inhabiting the area date from the Bronze Age and can be seen in form of dolmens such as those found in El Sot de Dones Mortes or in Pardinella. This area was later used by peoples from the Atlantic culture to store bronze weapons and as a passway from the Catalan Central Depression to the Pyrenees. The area also has tombs from the late Roman occupation age and some belonging to the Visigoths.

It has a famous Benedictine monastery built in the Romanesque style, Santa Maria de Ripoll, founded by the count Wilfred the Hairy in 879. The count used it as a centre to repopulate the region after conquering it. In the High Middle Ages, its castle, the Castle of Saguardia, located in the county of Les Llosses was ruled by the Saguàrdia family, of which Ponç de la Guàrdia was a famous troubadour.

An abundance of coal and iron ore, coupled with the ample water supply of the rivers Ter and Freser, encouraged a metal-working industry in the early Middle Ages. The furnaces of Ripoll were a prime source of nails for the peninsula. Later, pole arms and crossbows, always in demand, were added to Ripoll's exports. Ripoll enjoyed a reputation throughout Europe for the production of firearms. That success as a manufactory of firearms brought frequent trouble to the city. French invasions in 1794, 1809, 1812, and 1813 crippled the city’s industries. However, the final and utter destruction of Ripoll, resulting from mines and blasting, occurred in 1839 during the Carlist Wars. Due to the loss of records and archives, not much is known of Ripoll and its industry to this day.

== Climate ==
Ripoll has a humid subtropical climate (Köppen climate classification: Cfa) bordering on an oceanic climate (Köppen: Cfb) with cool winters and warm to hot summers. As in many areas of the province of Girona, rainfall is well distributed throughout the year. During the winter, temperatures below −5 °C (23 °F) are common, although there may be some winters in which they do not occur.

Climate data for Ripoll (1991–2020), extremes (1989-present)
Month	Jan	Feb	Mar	Apr	May	Jun	Jul	Aug	Sep	Oct	Nov	Dec	Year
Record high °C (°F)	21.0 (69.8)	23.0 (73.4)	25.7 (78.3)	30.8 (87.4)	34.1 (93.4)	40.6 (105.1)	40.0 (104.0)	38.0 (100.4)	33.2 (91.8)	30.4 (86.7)	24.3 (75.7)	19.5 (67.1)	40.6 (105.1)
Mean daily maximum °C (°F)	10.3 (50.5)	11.8 (53.2)	15.3 (59.5)	18.0 (64.4)	22.5 (72.5)	26.7 (80.1)	30.2 (86.4)	29.0 (84.2)	23.9 (75.0)	19.3 (66.7)	14.1 (57.4)	10.5 (50.9)	19.3 (66.7)
Daily mean °C (°F)	4.0 (39.2)	5.0 (41.0)	8.1 (46.6)	10.7 (51.3)	14.8 (58.6)	19.0 (66.2)	22.0 (71.6)	21.2 (70.2)	16.9 (62.4)	13.0 (55.4)	8.1 (46.6)	4.6 (40.3)	12.3 (54.1)
Mean daily minimum °C (°F)	−2.4 (27.7)	−1.8 (28.8)	0.9 (33.6)	3.4 (38.1)	7.0 (44.6)	11.2 (52.2)	13.8 (56.8)	13.4 (56.1)	9.9 (49.8)	6.7 (44.1)	2.0 (35.6)	−1.3 (29.7)	5.2 (41.4)
Record low °C (°F)	−13.7 (7.3)	−12.8 (9.0)	−11.3 (11.7)	−5.0 (23.0)	−2.0 (28.4)	0.5 (32.9)	4.0 (39.2)	3.5 (38.3)	−0.5 (31.1)	−5.1 (22.8)	−10.2 (13.6)	−13.3 (8.1)	−13.7 (7.3)
Average precipitation mm (inches)	40.3 (1.59)	33.4 (1.31)	48.7 (1.92)	72.4 (2.85)	85.9 (3.38)	113.3 (4.46)	70.1 (2.76)	96.2 (3.79)	94.3 (3.71)	71.2 (2.80)	61.1 (2.41)	48.6 (1.91)	835.5 (32.89)
Average precipitation days (≥ 1 mm)	4.4	4.2	5.7	8.4	8.2	8.4	7.3	8.8	7.3	6.6	5.4	3.8	78.5
Source: Agencia Estatal de Meteorologia

== Demographics ==
Ripoll is over 5% Muslim, predominately of Moroccan origin, who arrived in the 1990s to work in industrial factories.

== Famous citizens ==
- Eudald Domènech i Riera

== See also ==
- Ethnographic Museum of Ripoll
