= Thierry Gilardi =

French sports journalist

- Born: 26 July 1958; Saint-Germain-en-Laye, France
- Died: 25 March 2008 (aged 49); Le Port-Marly, France
- Education: Sciences Po
- Occupation: Sports commentator
- Employer(s): Canal + TF1

Thierry Gilardi (26 July 1958 – 25 March 2008) was a French football commentator.

== Biography ==
Gilardi was born in Saint-Germain-en-Laye, Yvelines to a family of Italian ancestry. He was an avid reader of the French sports newspaper L'Équipe from the age of six. He had always been passionate about sport, especially Rugby Union. He began playing at 11 years old at the Saint-Germain-en-Laye school of rugby and continued to play until the age of 28.

In an interview with reporter Nicolas Augot about rugby, for a special edition of the French monthly magazine Attitude Rugby focused on Stade Français, he said: "Saint-Germain-en-Laye is the chief town of the Yvelines, in the Île-de-France. We must not forget that the Île-de-France rugby community is the biggest in France by the number of licensed players and that the Saint-Germain-en-Laye club was the nursery for such players as the French fly-half, Franck Mesnel." He was married and the father of three children. Along with his career as a journalist, he was, at the beginning of the 1990s, the president of Saint-Germain-en-Laye rugby club, before handing over the role to Marcel Martin. From 1997, he was vice-president of Stade Français rugby club.

=== Career ===
A graduate of the Institut d'Études Politiques de Paris, Gilardi began his career as a journalist with an internship in television in 1982 at France Inter, under the direction of Arlette Chabot, where he was eventually taken on. He later worked with Pierre Loctin and Jacques Vendroux on football programs. Wanting to specialize in rugby union, he had to be content with football, quoting "Football is my job; rugby is my passion. When I started in the profession, sports journalists were always pushed in the direction of football, but I am happy to cover any sport."

From 1987 until his death, he commented, presented, edited, and led many sports programs on French television. Behind the scenes, he took on other roles, with responsibilities for the drafting of sports programs on the French encrypted channel. He was editor and head of football from 1997 to 1999, then editor-in-chief and sports managing editor of sports at Canal+ from 1999 to 2001.

In 2005, he left Canal+ to rejoin TF1 to present the Sunday program Téléfoot, replacing the iconic Thierry Roland. He was commentator and pundit for the matches in the UEFA Champions League, for all French internationals, and the 2006 FIFA World Cup, alongside Jean-Michel Larqué.

From September 2005 to June 2006, he co-presented LCI Morning with Mélissa Theuriau. In 2007, he commentated on matches of the Rugby World Cup on TF1 alongside Thierry Lacroix and on the programme Télérugby.

His voice has also been heard in the series of FIFA football video games produced by Electronic Arts.

His last match for TF1 was the return match between Olympique Lyonnais and Manchester United in the quarter-finals of the Champions League on 4 March 2008, and his last programme was Téléfoot on 23 March.

=== Death ===
On 24 March 2008, after a dinner between friends, he complained of back pain and suffered a heart attack at 3 a.m. (local time) at his home in Montfort-l'Amaury. On the spot, paramedics tried to revive him and took him to the hospital at Port-Marly, where his health condition deteriorated sharply during the day.

At around 4 p.m, Thierry Gilardi died, aged 49, following a second heart attack, on the eve of a friendly football match between France and England, on which he was due to commentate for TF1. The tribute of a minute's silence and the wearing of black armbands as a sign of mourning by the French players and the Stade Français rugby team, a few days later, showed the emotions of the world of sport throughout France. Additionally, Franck Ribéry was booked for removing his shirt to show a tribute to Gilardi after scoring.

Jean-Michel Larqué, a friend of Gilardi's, was so shocked by his death he was unable to comment the match.

Gilardi's funeral took place on 31 March 2008, in the presence of numerous sports and TV personalities. He was buried in the cemetery of Montfort-l'Amaury.
