= Thierry Roland =

French sports journalist (1937–2012)

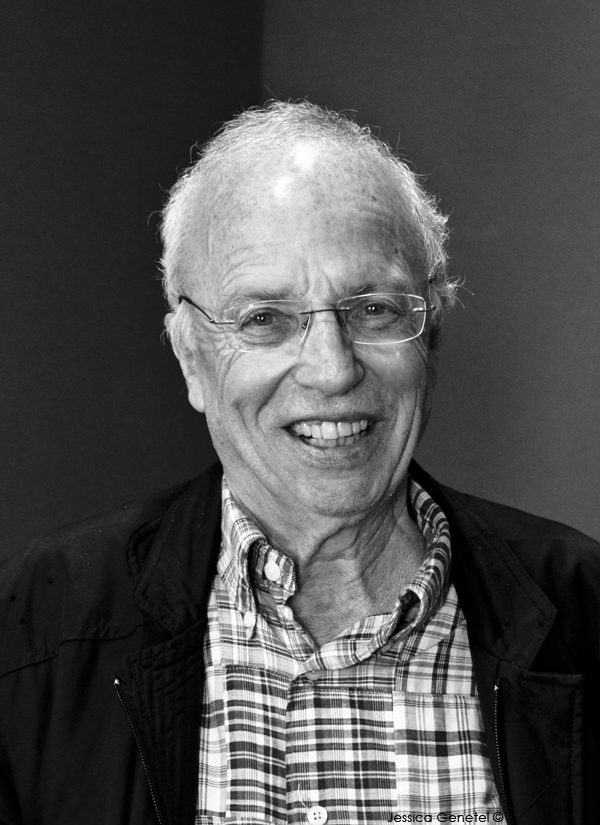
- Roland on 5 June 2012
- Born: Thierry José Roland; 4 August 1937; Boulogne-Billancourt, France
- Died: 16 June 2012 (aged 74); Paris, France
- Resting place: Passy Cemetery, Paris
- Occupation: Sports commentator
- Employer(s): Television: ORTF (1955–1968); Antenne 2 (1975–1984); TF1 (1984–2005); M6 and W9 (2005–2012); Radio: France Inter (1969–1975); RTL (1975–2012); Nostalgie (1996–1998)
- Awards: 1997 Sept d'Or for best sports journalist

Thierry José Roland (French pronunciation: [tjɛʁi ʒoze ʁɔˈlɑ̃]; 4 August 1937 – 16 June 2012) was a French sports commentator who was France's leading football commentator for 59 years. He began his career as a radio journalist for the ORTF when he was just 16 years old. Roland then became a television sports journalist at age 20. He commentated on more than 1,000 football matches, including thirteen World Cups beginning with the 1962 FIFA World Cup in Chile and including France's maiden World Cup win as hosts in 1998. He also commentated on nine UEFA European Championships. He was nicknamed La voix du football ("The voice of football").

Roland was born in Boulogne-Billancourt, a suburban city just southwest of Paris. He died in the 15th arrondissement of Paris of a cerebrovascular event at age 74.

== Bibliography ==
- La légende de la coupe du monde, Minerva, 1998
- La Fabuleuse histoire de la Coupe du monde, Minerva, October 2002
- Mes 100 plus grands matchs, Larousse, October 2005
- Mes 100 plus grands joueurs, Larousse, May 2006
- 100 % Bleus, Solar, 2008
- Mes 13 coupes du monde, Edition du Rocher, April 2010
- Mes plus grands moments de football, Larousse, May 2012

== Commentator style ==
Some of Thierry Roland's expressions in his comments of matches, such as: "These two will not spend their holidays together", "Broke like a rabbit in full flight", "He swallowed the trumpet", "The balloon went in the zig and he went in the zag "," He did not make the trip for nothing "or" This is not the right line of Longchamp ", contributed to his popularity.

But, he was also very criticized for his frankness, for his insults towards the referee ("Mr. Foote, you are a bastard !") or about a Romanian referee "I've never seen such a manure! Michel Hidalgo told me yesterday that Romanians were the easiest to buy ", its sexism and some expressions with racist connotation or simply abusive. Thus, commenting on the final of the 1966 Coupe de France for the ORTF, he explained after the victory of RC Strasbourg that "the Cup left France".

His particular style earned him a recurring caricature of the humorous show Les Guignols de l'info.

When France beat Brazil 3–0 in the 1998 World Cup final, he said on TF1's broadcast,

Après avoir vu ça, on peut mourir tranquille. Enfin, le plus tard possible, mais on peut. Ah c'est superbe. Quel pied, ah quel pied! Oh putain!
After seeing this, one can die in peace. Though, hopefully, not too soon…This is great, fuck, this is the bollocks!

— Roland on TF1's broadcast of the 1998 World Cup final after full time (translation by The Guardian)

== Tribute ==
Following the death of Thierry Roland, a minute of silence was observed in his honor during the France-Sweden UEFA Euro 2012 match in Kyiv.

On February 6, 2013, the press gallery of the Stade de France was renamed in his honor during a friendly between France and Germany.
