= List of Olympique de Marseille managers and presidents =

The following is a list of all Marseille presidents and managers.

== Presidents ==
Name	Years
(France) René Dufaure de Montmirail	1899–1902
(France) Arnaud Bideleux	1902–1905
(France) Gabriel Dard	1905–1908
(France) Arnaud Bideleux	1908–1909
(France) Paul Le Cesne	1909–1921
(Italy) Marino Dallaporta	1921–1924
(France) Gabriel Dard	1924–1935
(France) Henri Raynaud	1935–1938
(France) Gabriel Dard	1938
(France) Marcel Constant	1938–1945
(France) Pierre Robin	1945
(France) Louis-Bernard Dancausse	1945–1951
(France) Marcel Constant	1951–1954
(France) Louis Aillaud	1954–1956
(France) Saby Zaraya	1956–1963
(France) Jean-Marie Luciani	1963–1965
(France) Marcel Leclerc	1965–1972
(France) René Gallian	1972–April 1974
(France) Fernand Meric	April 1974–March 1977
(France) Norbert D'Agostino	March 1977–1978

Name	Years
(France) René Gallian	1978–1980
(France) Christian Carlini	1980–April 1981
(France) Hamlet Setta	April 1981–June 1981
(France) Jean Carrieu	1981–April 1986
(France) Bernard Tapie	April 1986–December 1994
(France) Pierre Cangioni	December 1994–January 1995
(France) Bernard Caïazzo	January 1995–Feb 1995
(France) Jean-Michel Ripa	February 1995–June 1995
(France) Jean-Claude Gaudin	June 1995–July 1995
(France) Jean-Claude Gaudin (France) Jean-Michel Roussier	July 1995–September 1996
(France) Robert Louis-Dreyfus	1996–September 2000
(France) Yves Marchand	2000–November 2001
(France) Robert Louis-Dreyfus	November 2001–2002
(France) Christophe Bouchet	2002–January 2005
(Senegal) Pape Diouf	January 2005–June 2009
(France) Jean-Claude Dassier	June 2009–June 2011
(France) Vincent Labrune	June 2011–July 2016
(Italy) (Switzerland) Giovanni Ciccolunghi (interim)	July 2016–October 2016
(France) Jacques-Henri Eyraud	October 2016– February 2021
(Spain) Pablo Longoria	February 2021– April 2026
(France) Stéphane Richard	April 2026– Incumbent

== Managers ==
Years	Manager
1923–1924	(Scotland) Peter Farmer
1924–1926	(France) André Gascard
1926–1927	(Scotland) Victor Gibson
1927–1928	(Switzerland) René Scheibenstock
1928–1930	(France) Paul Seitz
1930	(Scotland) Peter Farmer
1932–1933	(Scotland) Charlie Bell
1933–1935	(Austria) Vincent Diettrich
1935–October 1938	(Hungary) József Eisenhoffer
October 1938–1939	(Hungary) Willy Kohut (France) André Gascard
1939–1941	(Hungary) József Eisenhoffer
July 1941–January 1942	(France) André Gascard
January 1942–June 1942	(France) Paul Seitz
June 1942–1943	(France) André Blanc (France) Joseph Gonzales (or (Austria) Friedrich Donenfeld)
1943–January 1944	(France) Laurent Henric
January 1944–June 1944	(France) Joseph Gonzales
June 1944–1946	(France) Paul Wartel
1946–1947	(France) Jules Dewaquez
1947–1949	(Italy) Giuseppe Zilizzi
1949–1950	(France) Auguste Jordan
1950–1954	(France) Henri Roessler
1954–February 1956	(France) Roger Rolhion
February 1956–February 1958	(France) Jean Robin
February 1958–June 1958	(Italy) Giuseppe Zilizzi
1958–1959	(Switzerland) Louis Maurer
1959–February 1962	(France) Lucien Troupel
February 1962–July 1962	(Brazil) Otto Glória
July 1962–December 1962	(France) Armand Penverne
December 1962–July 1963	(Spain) Luis Miró
1963–1964	(France) Jean Robin
1964–1966	(France) Mario Zatelli
1966–November 1968	(France) Robert Domergue
November 1968–December 1968	(France) Jean Djorkaeff
December 1968–December 1970	(France) Mario Zatelli
January 1971–March 1972	(France) Lucien Leduc
March 1972–July 1972	(France) Mario Zatelli
July 1972–March 1973	(Germany) Kurt Linder
March 1973–August 1973	(France) Mario Zatelli
August 1973–December 1973	(France) Joseph Bonnel
December 1973–February 1974	(Chile) Fernando Riera
February 1974–1976	(France) Jules Zvunka
1976–February 1977	(France) José Arribas
February 1977–July 1977	(France) Jules Zvunka
1977–December 1978	(Socialist Federal Republic of Yugoslavia) Ivan Marković
December 1978–February 1980	(France) Jules Zvunka

Years	Manager
February 1980–September 1980	(France) Jean Robin
1 July 1980 – 1 March 1981	(France) Albert Batteux
14 April 1981–4 October 1984	(France) Roland Gransart
October 1984	(Socialist Federal Republic of Yugoslavia) Žarko Olarević
October 1984–1985	(France) Pierre Cahuzac
1985–1986	(Socialist Federal Republic of Yugoslavia) Žarko Olarević
1986–August 1988	(France) Gérard Banide
25 July 1988–September 1990	(France) Gérard Gili
1 September 1990–31 December 1990	(Germany) Franz Beckenbauer
January 1991–July 1991	(Belgium) Raymond Goethals
July 1991–October 1991	(Socialist Federal Republic of Yugoslavia) Tomislav Ivić
October 1991–1992	(Belgium) Raymond Goethals
1 July 1992–30 November 1992	(France) Jean Fernandez
November 1992–1993	(Belgium) Raymond Goethals
1993–December 1994	(France) Marc Bourrier
December 1994	(France) Gérard Gili
16 December 1994–June 1995	(France) Henri Stambouli
January 1995–30 June 1995	(France) Henri Stambouli (Croatia) Luka Peruzović
July 1995–15 September 1995	(France) Henri Stambouli
September 1995–1997	(France) Gérard Gili
1 July 1997–1 November 1999	(France) Rolland Courbis
25 November 1999–30 July 2000	(France) Bernard Casoni
1 July 2000–17 November 2000	(Brazil) Abel Braga
19 November 2000–25 November 2000	(France) Albert Emon (France) Christophe Galtier
27 November 2000–3 April 2001	(Spain) Javier Clemente
9 April 2001–30 July 2001	(Croatia) Tomislav Ivić
25 July 2001–24 August 2001	(France) José Anigo
August 2001	(Croatia) Josip Skoblar (France) Marc Lévy
31 August 2001–30 November 2001	(Croatia) Tomislav Ivić
November 2001–December 2001	(Croatia) Zoran Vujović
8 December 2001–30 July 2002	(France) Albert Emon
1 July 2002–14 January 2004	(France) Alain Perrin
14 January 2004–22 November 2004	(France) José Anigo
November 2004	(France) Albert Emon (France) Jean-Philippe Durand
27 November 2004–2 June 2005	(France) Philippe Troussier
1 July 2005–30 June 2006	(France) Jean Fernandez

Years	Manager
20 June 2006–25 September 2007	(France) Albert Emon
25 September 2007–30 June 2009	(Belgium) Eric Gerets
1 July 2009–2 July 2012	(France) Didier Deschamps
4 July 2012–7 December 2013	(France) Élie Baup
7 December 2013–14 May 2014	(France) José Anigo (caretaker)
17 May 2014–8 August 2015	(Argentina) Marcelo Bielsa
19 August 2015–19 April 2016	(Spain) Míchel
20 April 2016–20 October 2016	(France) Franck Passi (caretaker)
20 October 2016–28 May 2019	(France) Rudi Garcia
28 May 2019–2 February 2021	(Portugal) Andre Villas-Boas
2 February 2021–26 February 2021	(Morocco) Nasser Larguet (caretaker)
26 February 2021–1 July 2022	(Argentina) Jorge Sampaoli
4 July 2022–1 June 2023	(Croatia) Igor Tudor
23 June 2023–20 September 2023	(Spain) Marcelino
20 September 2023–27 September 2023	(France) Jacques Abardonado (caretaker)
27 September 2023–19 February 2024	(Italy) Gennaro Gattuso
20 February 2024–19 May 2024	(France) Jean-Louis Gasset
24 June 2024–11 February 2026	(Italy) Roberto De Zerbi
11 February 2026–18 February 2026	(France) Jacques Abardonado (caretaker)
18 February 2026–30 June 2026	(Senegal) Habib Beye
1 July 2026–present	(France) Bruno Génésio
