= Louis-Dreyfus =

Louis-Dreyfus may refer to:

== People ==
- Charles Louis-Dreyfus (1870–1929), co-director of the Louis Dreyfus Group
- Gérard Louis-Dreyfus (1932–2016), French-American businessman, father of Julia
- Julia Louis-Dreyfus (born 1961), American actress and comedian
- Kyril Louis-Dreyfus (born 1997), French businessman and chairman of Sunderland A.F.C. (an English football club)
- Léopold Louis-Dreyfus (1833–1915), French founder of the Louis Dreyfus Group and patriarch of the Louis-Dreyfus family
- Louis Louis-Dreyfus (1867–1940), co-director of the Louis Dreyfus Group
- Margarita Louis-Dreyfus (born 1962), Russian-born chairwoman of the Louis Dreyfus Group; widow of Robert Louis-Dreyfus
- Marie-Jeanne Louis-Dreyfus (born 1942), the birth name of French billionaire Marie-Jeanne Meyer
- Monique Louis-Dreyfus (born 1940), the birth name of French billionaire Monique Roosmale Nepveu
- Philippe Louis-Dreyfus (born 1945), French businessman, president of Louis Dreyfus Armateurs
- Pierre Louis-Dreyfus (1908–2011), French Resistance fighter and CEO of the Louis Dreyfus Group
- Robert Louis-Dreyfus (1946–2009), French/Swiss billionaire and CEO of Adidas

== Corporations ==
- Louis Dreyfus Group, an international trading group, founded in 1851
- Louis Dreyfus Armateurs, a French maritime transportation and logistics company, originally the shipping branch of the Louis Dreyfus Group

== See also ==
- Louis G. Dreyfus, Jr., American diplomat
