= DSNP =

DSNP may refer to:

- Distributed Social Networking Protocol (discontinued)
- Decentralized Social Networking Protocol (Project Liberty)
- Disney+
- DSMP, another spelling/acronym for Dream SMP
