= Jacques-Henri Eyraud =

French businessman (born 1968)

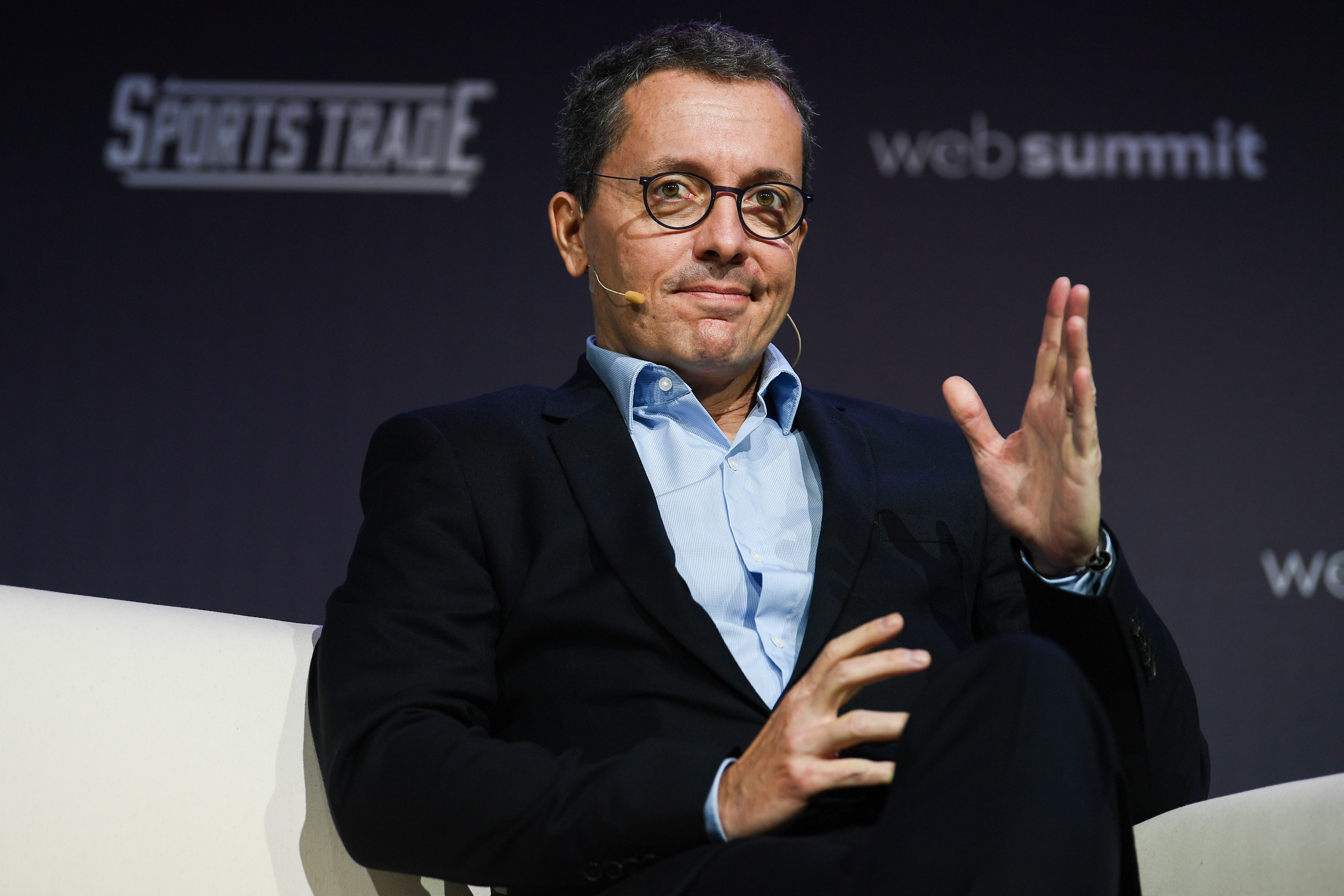
- Eyraud in 2018

President of Olympique de Marseille
- In office 17 October 2016 – 26 February 2021
- Preceded by: Giovanni Ciccolunghi (interim)
- Succeeded by: Pablo Longoria

Personal details
- Born: Jacques-Henri Antoine Eyraud; 22 March 1968 (age 58) Paris, France
- Education: Sciences Po; Paris Dauphine University; Harvard University
- Occupation: Master of Business Administration

Jacques-Henri Antoine Eyraud (born 22 March 1968 in Paris) is a French entrepreneur and media man. He is currently a European Club Association representative on the UEFA Club Competitions Committee, and part of the supervisory board of Marseille, the club in which he formerly served as president from 2016 to 2021.

== Education ==
Jacques-Henri Eyraud comes from a family of teachers. He graduated from Sciences Po Paris (class of 1989), Dauphine (Master 2 in telecommunications and new media management, 1990) and Harvard Business School (Master of Business Administration, 1998). At the age of 22, he did his military service as a press attaché for the Armed Forces Information and Public Relations Service during the Gulf War.

== From Disney to entrepreneurship ==
He joined Euro Disney as spokesman in 1991, six months before the opening of Disneyland Paris, then presented as Europe's "greatest project". He became the group's communications director.

Encouraged by Disney's CEO Steve Burke (now CEO of NBCUniversal), he entered Harvard at the end of 1996 to pursue an MBA. These two years spent on the Boston campus instigated his entrepreneurial spirit.

Upon his return, he became Director of New Products at Club Med under the direction of Philippe Bourguignon, one of his Disney mentors.

In 2000, he founded Sporever with Patrick Chêne. Two months before the bursting of the internet bubble, he raised $10 million. The company became the European leader in digital sports information, being the first to broadcast live football matches on mobile phones. In 2005, the startup was listed on Alternext and generated 13.5 million euros revenues. In 2009, he became chairman and chief executive officer of Turf Éditions, a media group dedicated to horse racing, for which he undertakes the digital transformation.

In 2016, he left his position to devote himself to Marseille presidency.

== Marseille ==
=== Takeover of the club ===
During the 2016 summer, when the club was put up for sale by Margarita Louis-Dreyfus, Jacques-Henri Eyraud first considered investing personally in the club. Didier Quillot, the new executive director of the LFP (Ligue de Football Professionnel), introduced him to Frank McCourt, who had previously expressed an interest in a club acquisition. The two men then decided to join forces. On 17 October 2016, the American businessman bought Marseille and Jacques-Henri Eyraud took over the leadership of the club.

=== Strategy and results ===
Upon his arrival, he showed high ambition through a project called "OM Champion" which is based on four axes: sports performance, with the objective of regularly qualifying the club for the UEFA Champions League and making youth training a central point of the club's strategy; fan experience; the club's civic commitment; and finally, its economic sustainability.

Rudi Garcia was appointed coach and Andoni Zubizarreta was appointed sports director.

A budget of 200 million euros spent over two years was announced to build a competitive team. During the first transfer window, in winter 2017, 44 million euros were spent on four players, including 30 million euros only for Dimitri Payet who became the most expensive recruit in the club's history.

At the same time, he restructured the club. The voluntary departure plan launched in June 2017 resulted in the end of OM TV in favor of investments in digital content. The OM Foundation was created to promote the club's social commitment.

At the end of the 2017–18 season, Adidas, the club's equipment supplier since 1974, was replaced by Puma, with whom OM signed a five-year partnership.

After several years of negotiations, in July 2018 he announced that he had reached an agreement with AREMA, a Bouygues subsidiary, to become the exclusive manager of the Stade Vélodrome. OM thus recovered all event activities (seminars, visits, concerts) and allowed itself to freely invest in the stadium (sound, light, etc). The creation of a museum near the stadium was also planned.

He ranked 13th in Ligue 1 when he took over the club, and the team finished fifth in the first year and fourth at the end of the 2017/2018 season. The first European campaign ended in a UEFA Europa League final, which was lost against Atlético Madrid. This was the club's fifth European final, and the first in 14 years. Attendance records were beaten at the Orange Vélodrome during the quarter-finals and semi-finals, respectively against RB Leipzig and RB Salzburg.

=== Institutional functions ===
Jacques-Henri Eyraud is a member of the board of directors and of the Bureau of the LFP.

On 10 September 2019, Eyraud was appointed as one of the European Club Association Representatives on the Club Competitions Committee in UEFA.

=== Innovation in football ===
At the Sport Innovation Summit 2018, he described his vision of the football of the future in a strong impact speech. Looking ahead to 2030, he anticipates the creation of a closed European Super League where the best European teams compete. He also describes the revolution brought about by artificial intelligence in decision-making and depicts the characteristics of the augmented football player of tomorrow.

=== Step down from president role ===
In February 2021, Eyraud left his role as the president of OM to instead work in the supervisory board of the club. He had been coming under fire by the supporters of the club, and Marseille was in a complicated situation following poor results on the pitch and the violent incident that occurred at La Commanderie with the fans. Pablo Longoria, previously director of football, replaced Eyraud as president. Earlier in February, OM manager André Villas-Boas had resigned, and had been replaced by Nasser Larguet as interim. Jorge Sampaoli would become the new coach in March, signing a contract until 2023.

== Recognition ==
In September 2018, a survey conducted by Capital ranked him sixth in the ranking of the French people's favorite business leaders. He is ahead of Jean-Michel Aulas (13th), to whom he opposes several times, including publicly during the 2017–18 season.

== Areas of interest ==
Jacques-Henri Eyraud was French junior champion of taekwondo in 1985 and a member of the French team from 1985 to 1987.

Since 2007, he has been teaching at Sciences Po Paris, where he teaches the "Introduction to Entrepreneurship" course.

Passionate about music, he quotes a verse from IAM in an interview and claims his taste for his musical idols such as Warren G, The Clash or Rammstein.

== Honours ==
- Knight of the Legion of Honour: 2020
