= ASCE (disambiguation) =

ASCE may refer to:

- American Society of Civil Engineers
- Association of Significant Cemeteries in Europe
- Abuja Securities and Commodities Exchange
- AS Corbeil-Essonnes
  - AS Corbeil-Essonnes (football)
  - AS Corbeil-Essonnes XIII Spartans
