= AS Corbeil-Essonnes (football) =

Defunct football team in Corbeil-Essonnes, France

Corbeil-Essonnes
- Full name: Association Sportive de Corbeil-Essonnes
- Short name: ASCE
- Founded: 1951
- Dissolved: 2016
- Stadium: Stade Albert Mercier; Stade de Robinson
- Website: https://as-football.footeo.com/

Association Sportive de Corbeil-Essonnes was a football team located in Corbeil-Essonnes, France. Founded in 1951, it was the football section of the parent multi-sport club AS Corbeil-Essonnes, but the section stopped operations in 2016. The colours of the team were green and white.

== History ==
AS Corbeil-Essonnes was founded in 1951 as the product of a merger between FC Corbeil and Sporting Club Essonne. The highest tier it played at in its history was the Division 2, which it reached in the 1980–81 and 1982–83 seasons. The furthest Corbeil-Essonnes progressed in the Coupe de France was the round of 64, achieving this feat in the 1960–61 and 1984–85 editions of the tournament.

In 2016, the football section of AS Corbeil-Essonnes closed down.

=== Managerial history ===
- (France) Joseph Mercier
- 1970–1979: (France) José Garcia
- 1979–1980: (France) Bernard Deferrez
- 1982–1983: (Argentina) Osvaldo Piazza
- 1988–1989: (France) (Burkina Faso) André Bodji
- 1993–1994: (France) Camille Choquier
- 1994–1998: (France) Rudi Garcia
- 2001–2003: (France) Isaac N'Gata

== Notable former players ==
- (France) François Blin
- (France) Frédéric Bompard
- (France) Warren Bondo (youth)
- (France) Demba Diagouraga
- (France) Rudi Garcia
- (France) Attilio Moretti
- (France) Guy Nosibor
- (France) Stéphane Persol
- (Argentina) Osvaldo Piazza
- (Morocco) Walid Regragui (youth)
- (Algeria) Djamel Zidane

== Honours ==
AS Corbeil-Essonnes honours
Honour	No.	Years
Division d'Honneur Paris	3	1959–60, 1974–75, 1996–97
Division 3 North Group	1	1981–82
