= Diagouraga =

Diagouraga is a surname. Notable people with the surname include:

- Demba Diagouraga (born 1978), French footballer
- Fanta Diagouraga (born 2000), Congolese handball player
- Mahamet Diagouraga (born 1984), French former footballer
- Toumani Diagouraga (born 1987), French former footballer
