= Frédéric Bompard =

French football manager (born 1962)

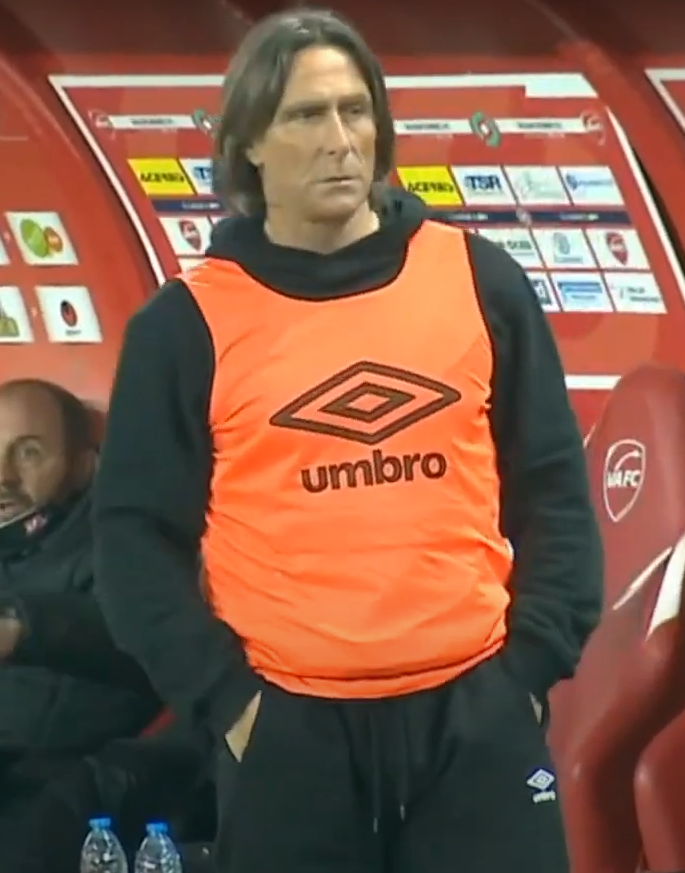
- Bompard in 2021

Personal information
- Date of birth: 30 December 1962 (age 63)
- Place of birth: Asnières-sur-Seine, France
- Height: 1.80 m (5 ft 11 in)
- Position: Goalkeeper

Senior career*
Years	Team	Apps	(Gls)
1983–1986	Corbeil-Essonnes		
1986–1987	Évry		
1987–1991	Reims	2	(0)
1991–1992	Racing Besançon		
1994–1996	Corbeil-Essonnes		
1996–1999	Paris FC		

Managerial career
- 1996–1999: Paris FC B
- 2000–2001: Béziers FC 34
- 2002–2004: Dijon B
- 2002–2007: Dijon (assistant)
- 2007–2008: Le Mans (assistant)
- 2008–2013: Lille (assistant)
- 2013–2016: Roma (assistant)
- 2016–2019: Marseille (assistant)
- 2020–2021: Guingamp (assistant)
- 2021: Guingamp
- 2022–2024: Nîmes
- 2025: Sochaux
- * Club domestic league appearances and goals

Frédéric "Fred" Bompard (born 30 December 1962) is a French professional football manager and former player. As a player, he was a goalkeeper.

== Managerial career ==
=== Early career ===
While playing for Paris FC in the third division of French football, Bompard simultaneously coached the reserve side of the club. He left the club in 1999. For the 2000–01 season, he would manage fifth-tier Béziers FC 34.

=== Dijon ===
In 2002, Bompard joined Dijon. He initially took a triple role of B team coach, first team assistant, and goalkeeping coach, but after 2004, he stopped managing the B team. At Dijon, he worked with his colleague Rudi Garcia, with whom he would work with in his four future clubs. Bompard left DFCO in 2007.

=== Assistant manager roles ===
From 2007 to 2019, Bompard worked for several different clubs as assistant manager. He would go by Le Mans, Lille, Roma, and finally, Marseille. In all these roles, he worked under the management of Rudi Garcia.

=== Guingamp ===
In May 2020, Bompard joined Guingamp as assistant manager. However, following the dismissal of Mehmed Baždarević on 1 February 2021, he was appointed interim coach. Bompard was given the full role of manager on 24 February. However, at the end of the season, he and the club decided to end their collaboration.

=== Nîmes ===
On 21 November 2022, Bompard was appointed as head coach of Ligue 2 club Nîmes, after his predecessor Nicolas Usaï was dismissed. He signed a contract until the end of the 2023–24 season. Thibault Giresse was appointed as Bompard's assistant coach.
