= Pablo Longoria =

Spanish football executive (born 1986)

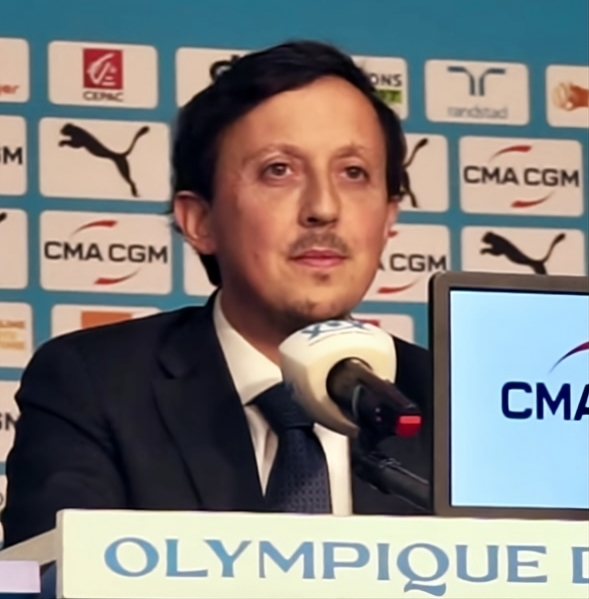
- Longoria in 2024

President of Olympique de Marseille
- In office 26 February 2021 – 1 March 2026
- Preceded by: Jacques-Henri Eyraud
- Succeeded by: Stéphane Richard

Personal details
- Born: Pablo Fernández Longoria; 9 June 1986 (age 40) Oviedo, Spain
- Occupation: Football executive

Pablo Fernández Longoria (born 9 June 1986) is a Spanish football executive. He served as the president of Olympique de Marseille from 2021 to 2026. He is currently serving as the sporting director at River Plate in the Argentine Primera Division.

== Early life ==
Born in Oviedo, Pablo Longoria began at 12 to watch football matches every day as a hobby. A supporter of Sporting Gijón, he enjoys video games such as FIFA 2000 and Football Manager and gained from them a deep knowledge of players and tactical aspects of football.

== Career ==
Impressed by the 18-year-old's deep knowledge and analytical skills on Longoria's own website SoccerOle.com, agent Eugenio Botas, who works most notably with the Spanish manager Marcelino, invited Pablo Longoria for what was supposed to be a weekend stay to analyze players. That collaboration stretched into a few months, and Longoria officially began his career in 2004–2005 working under Botas as an assistant and scout. Marcelino, as manager of Recreativo (from 2005 to 2007) then of Racing Santander (from 2007 to 2008), relied on the analysis of the young Longoria while building his team.

Longoria became a media consultant with Radio Marca after having been spotted by the journalist Axel Torres on the forum of Longoria's website, SoccerOle.com. At the same time, he began a career as a scout at the English club Newcastle United in November 2007. He didn't stay there very long however, before becoming head scout at Recreativo in February 2009. He later revealed that he wished to hire the Portuguese manager André Villas-Boas as head coach at the club. Villas-Boas signed instead with Académica de Coimbra.

In December 2010, he became a scout at Atalanta, then in the Italian Serie B. After three years at the club, he joined Sassuolo in July 2013 as head scout, before joining Juventus in August 2015. Notably, he was responsible for the decision to sign the Uruguayan midfielder Rodrigo Bentancur.

Longoria, who can speak six languages (Spanish, French, English, Italian, Portuguese and German), became sporting director of Valencia in February 2018. Famous for his work, he has said that he watches seven or eight matches of football most days.

=== Marseille ===
Longoria was named sporting director of French Ligue 1 club Olympique Marseille (OM) on 26 July 2020, succeeding his compatriot Andoni Zubizarreta. He initially declared his intention to work for the club for five years, with the objective of stabilizing Marseille as one of the 20 best European clubs. Later, however, he stated that he wanted to stay at Marseille for a long time, making it his “last great adventure”. During his first months at the club, he oversaw the arrivals of future Brazilian prospect Luis Henrique from Botafogo, as well as more established players like Arkadiusz Milik and Yuto Nagatomo.

On 26 February 2021, he was named president of Marseille with responsibility for the financial and sporting sectors of the club. Longoria became the youngest president of the club since 1909. He brought in Jorge Sampaoli to succeed Nasser Larguet, the interim manager following the departure of André Villas-Boas. In July 2022, Sampaoli left the club by mutual consent, and was replaced by Igor Tudor. Tudor would go on to stay only one season at OM, and was succeeded by Longoria's former colleague Marcelino, who himself only lasted three months before resigning. Marcelino quit due to fans' groups reportedly "threatening" the club's hierarchy during a meeting with club staff. In an interview with La Provence, Longoria stated that "it is not normal for a football director to be threatened". Accused by supporters of lining his pockets with the club's money, Longoria asked owner Frank McCourt's group McCourt Global to conduct an investigation to prove his innocence. On 22 September, Longoria confirmed his intention to remain as the president of OM.

In February 2025, following Olympique de Marseille's defeat to AJ Auxerre, Longoria publicly described the refereeing as "corruption". His remarks sparked widespread controversy and resulted in a 15-match suspension imposed by the disciplinary committee of the Ligue de Football Professionnel (LFP). He later clarified that he had not intended to accuse French football of being corrupt.

During the 2025–26 season, tensions within Olympique de Marseille intensified amid poor results and internal disagreements over the club’s sporting direction. The crisis escalated following the elimination from the UEFA Champions League league phase and a defeat 5–0 to rivals Paris Saint-Germain in Ligue 1, sealing the departure of head coach Roberto De Zerbi and growing dissatisfaction among sections of the club’s supporter base. In February 2026, graffiti targeting president Pablo Longoria appeared at the club’s training centre, calling for his resignation as the atmosphere around the club deteriorated.

At the same time, the club’s sporting director Medhi Benatia briefly announced his resignation before being convinced by owner Frank McCourt to remain in his position until the remaining of the season and take greater control over sporting decisions. The decision effectively reduced Longoria’s influence within the club’s hierarchy and left him responsible primarily only for institutional matters. According to reports in French media, Longoria felt personally betrayed by Benatia, whom he had previously promoted within the club’s leadership structure. Following the governance changes and his diminished authority, Longoria informed ownership of his intention to leave the club, with negotiations beginning over the terms of his departure. The club officially announced the departure of Longoria on 23 March 2026.

==== Assessment of his presidency at Olympique de Marseille ====
Longoria's presidency of Olympique de Marseille has received mixed assessments. During his five-year tenure, the club completed more than 230 player transfers and underwent several changes to its executive leadership. The period was also marked by significant financial difficulties, with the club reporting one of the largest net losses in its history in its most recent financial year. In this context, Olympique de Marseille became subject to UEFA proceedings that could result in sporting sanctions.

=== River Plate ===
On 29 April 2026, Pablo Longoria was officially announced as the new sporting director of the Argentine Primera Division club River Plate. His responsibilities at the club include coordinating the various areas related to football including the professional squad, youth academy, scouting, contract management, performance analysis, and player development.
