= Hôtel de Ville, Corbeil-Essonnes =

Town hall in Corbeil-Essonnes, France

Hôtel de Ville
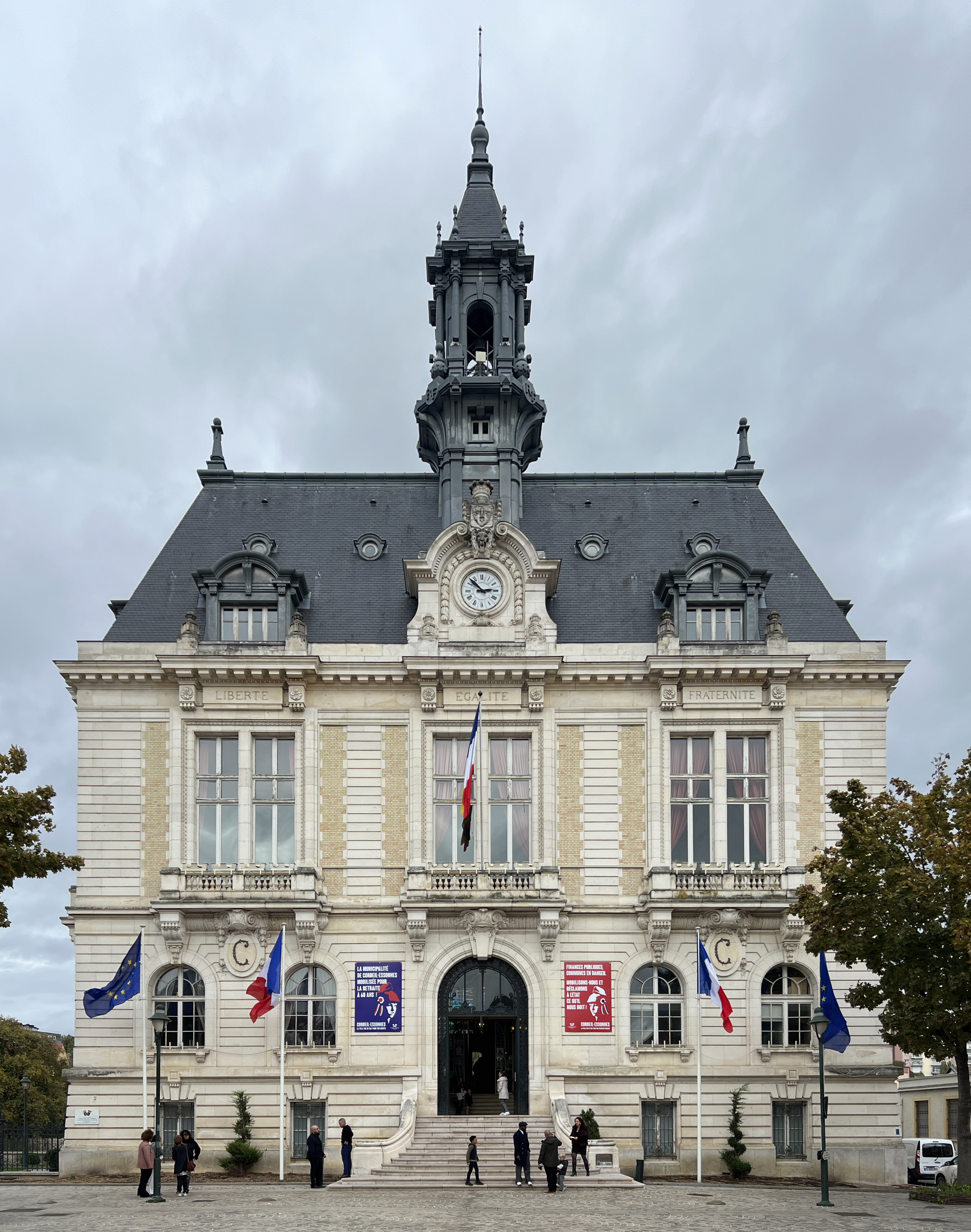
- The main frontage of the Hôtel de Ville in October 2023
- Interactive map of the Hôtel de Ville area

General information
- Type: City hall
- Architectural style: Neoclassical style
- Location: Corbeil-Essonnes, France
- Coordinates: 48.6139°N 2.4821°E
- Completed: 1906

Design and construction
- Architect: François Louis Tavernier

The Hôtel de Ville (French pronunciation: [otɛl də vil], City Hall) is a municipal building in Corbeil-Essonnes, Essonne, in the southern suburbs of Paris, standing on Place Galignani.

== History ==
After the French Revolution, meetings of the town council of Corbeil were initially held in the house of the mayor at the time. A small municipal building was established on the market square in around 1850. The council then relocated to No.13 Place Saint-Guenault in late 1859, before being accommodated in the old priory house of Saint-Guenault, which was being used as a sub-prefecture, in 1865.

After finding this arrangement inadequate, the council decided to commission a purpose-built town hall. The site they selected was on the northeast side of Place Galignani, named after William and Antoine Galignani, who had been significant benefactors to the town, funding a hospice, an orphanage and a school. The foundation stone for the new building was laid on 17 March 1904. It was designed by François Louis Tavernier in the neoclassical style, built in ashlar stone and was officially opened by the mayor, Victor Calliet, in the presence of the Minister for Agriculture, Joseph Ruau, on 8 July 1906.

The design involved a symmetrical main frontage of three bays facing southwest onto Place Galignani. The central bay featured a short flight of steps leading up to a round headed opening with a moulded surround and a keystone. The outer bays were fenestrated by pairs of rounded headed windows on the ground floor and there were three large casement windows with balustrades on the first floor. The first floor windows were flanked by banded pilasters supporting an entablature and a modillioned cornice. There was clock with an ornate surround above the central bay and dormer windows above the outer bays and, behind the clock, there was a steep roof and an octagonal lantern. Internally, the principal room was the Salle du Conseil (council chamber).

After the commune of Corbeil merged with the commune of Essonnes in August 1951, the town of Corbeil at Place Galignani became the offices and meeting place of the enlarged commune. (Note: The town hall of Essonne at Place d'Essonnes was designed in a similar style, also built in ashlar stone and was completed in around 1916. It now serves as the Claude-Debussy Music Conservatory.) From 1995 to 2009, the mayor, with an office in the town hall was the billionaire, Serge Dassault, who was also chairman of the aircraft manufacturer, the Dassault Group.
