= AS Corbeil-Essonnes =

Multi-sport club in Corbeil-Essonnes, France

ASCE
- Full name: Association Sportive de Corbeil-Essonnes
- Sport: Artistic gymnastics Athletics; Basketball; Bocce volo Boxing; Cycling; Dancing; Diving; Fencing; Football (until 2016); Handball; Judo; Jujutsu; Kayaking; Pool; Rhythmic gymnastics Rowing; Rugby; Savate; Swimming; Table tennis Water skiing
- Based in: Corbeil-Essonnes, France

Association Sportive de Corbeil-Essonnes (ASCE) is a multi-sport club located in Corbeil-Essonnes, France. Under the ASCE Union, it brings together 30 sections of ASCE.

== Sections ==
- AS Corbeil-Essonnes Kayaking
- AS Corbeil-Essonnes Football (closed down in 2016)
- AS Corbeil-Essonnes XIII Spartans
