= Monique Roosmale Nepveu =

French billionaire (born 1940)

- Born: Monique Louis Dreyfus; 1940 (age 85–86)
- Known for: minority shareholder of Louis Dreyfus Group
- Spouse: Louis Jan Roosmale Nepveu
- Children: 2
- Parent(s): Jean Louis-Dreyfus; Jeanne Madeline Depierre
- Relatives: Marie-Jeanne Meyer (sister); Robert Louis-Dreyfus (brother)

Monique Roosmale Nepveu (born 1940) is a French billionaire and member of the Louis Dreyfus family.

== Early life ==
Born Monique Louis-Dreyfus, she was one of three children born to Jean and Jeanne Madeline (née Depierre) Louis-Dreyfus. Her brother is Robert Louis-Dreyfus and her sister is Marie-Jeanne Meyer. Her father was Jewish and her mother Roman Catholic. She is the great granddaughter of Léopold Louis-Dreyfus, founder of the Louis-Dreyfus Group, which had begun buying and selling wheat in the Alsace region a century earlier, and rapidly diversified into shipping, oil and other commodities. Her grandfather was Louis Louis-Dreyfus who served in the French Parliament during the French Third Republic. After the death of her brother Robert, his widow and second wife Margarita Louis-Dreyfus (born Rita Bogdanova), inherited 60% of the Louis Dreyfus Group (later increased to 65% in 2012). Monique owns 12.5% of the Louis Dreyfus Group making her a billionaire.

== Personal life ==
She was married to Louis Jan "Jack" Roosmale Nepveu (August 8, 1928 – April 9, 2013). Her husband, a Dutch commoner born in Pretoria, South Africa, was previously engaged to Princess Marie Louise of Bulgaria. They have two children.
