= Kyril Louis-Dreyfus =

French businessman and football chairman (born 1997)

- Born: 18 December 1997 (age 28); Zürich, Switzerland
- Known for: Chairman and majority owner of Sunderland
- Spouse: Alexandra Nowikovsky (m. 2021)
- Children: 1
- Parent(s): Robert Louis-Dreyfus; Margarita Louis-Dreyfus
- Relatives: Julia Louis-Dreyfus (paternal third cousin)

Kyril Louis-Dreyfus (born 18 December 1997) is a Swiss-French businessman. He is a member of the French Louis-Dreyfus family, his parents being former successive owners of French football club Olympique de Marseille.

On 18 February 2021, Louis-Dreyfus became the minority shareholder and Chairman of Premier League football club Sunderland, then in EFL League One. In June 2022, after their promotion to the EFL Championship, he became the majority shareholder.

== Early life ==
Louis-Dreyfus was born in Zürich, Switzerland. He is the son of Robert Louis-Dreyfus and Margarita Louis-Dreyfus.

In 2017, Louis-Dreyfus started studying sports and business management at the Leeds Beckett University for one year and moved to attend Richmond International Academic and Soccer Academy (RIASA) for his second year. He later dropped out due to injuries.

== Career ==
In 2021, he acquired a "controlling" stake in the then EFL League One club, Sunderland A.F.C., from its previous owner, Stewart Donald. The acquisition made him the youngest chairman in English football. On 15 February 2022, it was revealed that Louis-Dreyfus was not a majority shareholder of Sunderland as his stake in the club was only 41%, with the remaining 59% of shares made up of former owner Donald, and directors Charlie Methven and Juan Sartori.

In June 2022, Louis-Dreyfus increased his shares in Sunderland from 41% to 51% - thus becoming majority & controlling shareholder - buying out Charlie Methven's 5%, and reducing Stewart Donald's percentage from 34% to 19%. Juan Sartori picked up the remainder of Donald's shares, increasing his holdings from 20% to 30%.

In May 2023, Stewart Donald's remaining shares were bought out by both Louis-Dreyfus and Sartori - Louis-Dreyfus increased his share holdings in Sunderland to 64%, whilst Sartori increase his to 36%. Many Sunderland supporters welcomed this news, bringing to a close the involvement of Donald and Methven in the football club.

Louis-Dreyfus is also a 5% stakeholder of French football club, Marseille, and has stakes in E-sports organisation Ovation.

On 24 May 2025, Sunderland achieved promotion to the Premier League after defeating Sheffield United 2-1 at Wembley Stadium in the 2025 EFL Championship play-off final with goals from Eliezer Mayenda and Tommy Watson, cancelling out Tyrese Campbell's first half goal. It took under 5 years, including two promotions in that time, to achieve the goal of getting Sunderland back into the Premier League from when he took over stewardship.

== Personal life ==
On 21 December 2021 in St. Moritz, Switzerland, Louis-Dreyfus married his longtime girlfriend Alexandra Nowikovsky, the daughter of Sydney-born former Australian model Toneya Bird. They announced the birth of their first child on 16 March 2024.
