= Marie-Jeanne Meyer =

French billionaire

- Born: Marie-Jeanne Louis Dreyfus; 1942 (age 83–84)
- Citizenship: French
- Known for: minority shareholder of Louis Dreyfus Group
- Spouse: Philippe Meyer
- Children: 3
- Parent(s): Jean Louis-Dreyfus; Jeanne Madeline Depierre
- Relatives: Monique Roosmale Nepveu (sister); Robert Louis-Dreyfus (brother)

Marie-Jeanne Meyer (born 1942) is a French billionaire and member of the Louis Dreyfus family.

== Early life ==
Born Marie-Jeanne Louis-Dreyfus, she was one of three children born to Jean and Jeanne Madeline (née Depierre) Louis-Dreyfus. Her brother is Robert Louis-Dreyfus and her sister is Monique Roosmale Nepveu. Her father was Jewish and her mother Roman Catholic. She is the great granddaughter of Léopold Louis-Dreyfus, founder of the Louis-Dreyfus Group, which had begun buying and selling wheat in the Alsace region a century earlier, and rapidly diversified into shipping, oil and other commodities. Her grandfather was Louis Louis-Dreyfus who served in the French Parliament during the French Third Republic. After the death of her brother Robert, his widow and second wife Margarita Louis-Dreyfus (b: Rita Bogdanova), inherited 60% of the Louis Dreyfus Group (later increased to 65% in 2012). As of 2013, Marie-Jeanne owned 12.5% of the Louis Dreyfus Group making her a billionaire. In 2009, she founded the venture capital company Florac SAS.

As of March 2015, she had a net worth of US$1.5 billion.

== Personal life ==
She is married to Philippe Meyer. They have three children.

Actress Julia Louis-Dreyfus is her cousin.
