= Osvaldo Piazza =

Argentine footballer and manager

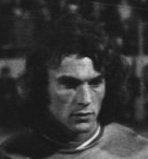
- Piazza in 1976

Personal information
- Full name: Osvaldo José Piazza
- Date of birth: 6 April 1947 (age 79)
- Place of birth: Buenos Aires, Argentina
- Height: 1.83 m (6 ft 0 in)
- Position: Defender

Youth career
- Lanús

Senior career*
Years	Team	Apps	(Gls)
1967–1972	Lanús	113	(1)
1972–1979	Saint-Étienne	244	(19)
1979–1982	Vélez Sársfield	104	(0)
1982–1983	Corbeil-Essonnes	24	(0)
Total		485	(20)

International career
1972–1977	Argentina	15	(0)

Managerial career
- 1982–1983: Corbeil-Essonnes
- 1990–1991: Almirante Brown
- 1992–1994: Olimpia
- 1994–1997: Vélez Sársfield
- 1997–1998: Universitario
- 2000–2002: Independiente
- 2002: Universitario
- 2003: Libertad
- 2004: Atlético de Rafaela
- * Club domestic league appearances and goals

Osvaldo José Piazza (born 6 April 1947) is an Argentine professional football manager and former player. In his playing days, he was a defender.

== Biography ==
He arrived at AS Saint-Étienne in 1972, replacing new coach Robert Herbin at the fullback position. He was associated with Christian Lopez and had the habit of helping the team offensively. He won many titles with AS Saint-Étienne. He was very popular at this time, and Bernard Sauvat wrote a song dedicated to him. Piazza earned 15 caps for Argentina, but could not participate in the 1978 FIFA World Cup in his country due to family problems, even though César Luis Menotti wanted him in the squad. In 1979, he played for Club Atlético Vélez Sársfield, before returning to France with Corbeil-Essonnes, as a player-coach, but it was a failure.

== Titles ==
=== Player ===
Lanús

- Primera B Metropolitana: 1971

AS Saint-Étienne

- Ligue 1: 1974, 1975, 1976
- Coupe de France 1974, 1975, 1977
- European Cup runner-up: 1975–76

==== Individual Awards ====
- Onze d'Or Onze Mondial: 1976, 1977
- French Division 1 Foreign Player of the Year: 1974–75

=== Manager ===
Olimpia

- Liga Paraguaya: Primera División: 1993

Vélez Sarsfield

- Primera División Argentina: 1995 Apertura, 1996 Clausura
- Supercopa Sudamericana: 1996
- Recopa Sudamericana: 1997

Universitario

- Primera División Peruana: 1998
