= Distributed Social Networking Protocol =

- Communication protocol
- Purpose: Decentralized social networking
- Developer: Project Liberty Institute
- Introduction: October 2020; 5 years ago
- Website: dsnp.org

Distributed Social Networking Protocol (DSNP) is an open-source protocol designed to enable decentralized social networking by allowing interoperability between platforms. Decentralized networks using protocols such as DSNP can implicitly help to enable increased user anonymity, thus enhancing a user's security and privacy. It allows individuals to connect across various platforms and tools without having to create and manage separate accounts, potentially reducing the division between users of individual platforms.

== Benefits ==
Decentralization allows users to retain ownership of their information and enables them to move personal data between platforms. The use of decentralized platforms can also benefit availability through the use of redundancy. Cryptographic proof of ownership techniques allow decentralized networks to minimize the exposure of users' sensitive information. It provides a framework for open digital interactions that enables users to maintain a consistent social identity across multiple applications.

DSNP can improve user data privacy and security by permitting fine-grained management of their personal information. Operating on an application-agnostic model similar to SMTP for email, the DSNP promotes the development of interoperable applications. By using encryption and permission-based access systems, DSNP enables users to determine who can view and interact with their data, supporting their ability to manage their digital presence.

== See also ==
- Distributed social network
- ActivityPub
- Bluesky
- IP address
- Mastodon
- Nostr
