= Robert Louis-Dreyfus =

French businessman (1946–2009)

- Louis-Dreyfus in 2003
- Born: 14 June 1946; Paris, France
- Died: 4 July 2009 (aged 63); Zürich, Switzerland
- Occupation: Businessman
- Known for: CEO of Adidas (1994–2001); CEO of Saatchi & Saatchi (1989–93); Majority shareholder of Marseille (1996–2009)
- Spouse(s): Sarah Oberholzer (m. 19??; div. 1989) Margarita Bogdanova (m. 1992)
- Children: 3, including Kyril Louis-Dreyfus
- Relatives: Monique Roosmale Nepveu (sister); Marie-Jeanne Meyer (sister); Louis Louis-Dreyfus (paternal grandfather); Léopold Louis-Dreyfus (paternal great-grandfather); Julia Louis-Dreyfus (paternal second cousin once removed)

Robert Louis-Dreyfus (14 June 1946 – 4 July 2009) was a French businessman who was chief executive officer (CEO) of Adidas (then Adidas Salomon) and Saatchi & Saatchi. He was a majority shareholder of the French football team Marseille, and during his tenure they re-emerged as a major European club.

== Early life ==
Robert Louis-Dreyfus was born in Paris, the son of Jean and Jeanne Madeline (née Depierre) Louis-Dreyfus. His father was Jewish and his mother Roman Catholic. He was a great-grandson of Léopold Louis-Dreyfus, founder of the Louis-Dreyfus Group, which had begun buying and selling wheat in the Alsace region a century earlier, and rapidly diversified into shipping, oil and other commodities. His grandfather was Louis Louis-Dreyfus, who served in the French Parliament. He has two sisters: Marie-Jeanne and Monique.

Robert Louis-Dreyfus was initially a student who failed his Baccalauréat, but he excelled at poker, winning considerable amounts of money from his friends at the Lycée Janson de Sailly in Paris. In 1967, he spent time at a kibbutz and was involved in the Six-Day War. He later secured a place at Harvard Business School with a presentation about his experiences during the war. He spent the early years of his working life mentored by Siegmund Warburg, in the family business of the Louis-Dreyfus Group.

== Business career ==
In 1982, Louis-Dreyfus joined IMS, the US pharmaceutical research company enjoying spectacular monetary success. His original US$400,000 grew twentyfold by the time the company was sold in 1988. He was CEO at Saatchi & Saatchi, the United Kingdom-based advertising agency, from 1989 to 1993. Louis-Dreyfus invested his own money in Saatchi & Saatchi, and during his tenure the agency grew considerably.

He proved equally successful when in 1994 he took the top job at Adidas, the German-based sporting goods maker. Louis-Dreyfus added to the brand by streamlining the product line and adding new companies to the group, including the Salomon ski-wear and golf company in 1997. He remained CEO of Adidas until 2001, combining this position with chairmanship of Neuf Telecom, with whom he worked until 2004. He also was a director of Neuf Cegetel.

Louis-Dreyfus re-joined the family company, Louis-Dreyfus Group, in May 2000, and restructured this major commodities trading and merchandising firm.

In 2005, he decided to relaunch the Le Coq Sportif sports company through a Swiss investment company, Airesis.

== Sporting interests ==
In 1996, Louis-Dreyfus became the majority shareholder of French football team Olympique de Marseille, who had recently been rocked by a major match fixing scandal and subsequently relegated to the French second division as part of their punishment. Louis-Dreyfus, with Adidas and the telecommunications company Neuf, sponsored the team; Louis-Dreyfus invested heavily in rebuilding the Marseille squad and the financial fortunes of the club improved, with shirt sales notably improving. However, trophies still eluded the club despite reaching the final of the UEFA Cup on two occasions, in 1999 and 2004, and losing twice consecutively in the final of the Coupe de France, in 2006 and 2007. Marseille also missed out on the Ligue 1 title during Louis-Dreyfus's tenure, though shortly before his death OM finished second to Bordeaux and qualified for the group stage of the UEFA Champions League. Following his passing in July 2009, his wife Margarita Louis-Dreyfus took over as the majority shareholder of the club.

Louis-Dreyfus was also a shareholder in the Belgium football club Standard Liège, and was involved in the creation of Infront Sports & Media in 2002 (transition from the former KirchSport completed in February 2003), and was its chairman and majority shareholder until his death. The Swiss-based sports marketing agency handled the media rights distribution of the FIFA World Cup in 2002 and 2006. Today, it is the marketing partner of 130 sports federations and clubs.

== FIFA World Cup bribery allegations ==
In October 2015, the German news magazine Der Spiegel reported that the bidding committee for the FIFA World Cup 2006 had set up a slush fund that Louis-Dreyfus, at the time CEO of Adidas, filled with CHF 10.3 million in 2000. Allegedly, these funds were used to bribe numerous FIFA officials and secure Germany's bid to host the 2006 World Cup, while a FIFA report had strongly criticised England's supposedly 'unprofessional' rival bid presentation. According to internal FIFA documents, Louis-Dreyfus had demanded a repayment of the funds in 2004, which were transferred as €6.7 million via a FIFA account in Geneva to an account held by Louis-Dreyfus.

== Death ==
Louis-Dreyfus died in Zürich aged 63 on 4 July 2009, following a long period with leukemia.

== Personal life ==
Louis-Dreyfus was married twice. Before divorcing his first wife, Sarah Oberholzer, in 1989, he met his second wife Margarita Bogdanova in 1988, whom he married in 1992 and with whom he had three sons: Eric, Maurice, and Kyril Louis-Dreyfus, the latter of whom became the chairman and majority shareholder of English football club Sunderland A.F.C. in February 2021, aged only 24. In the late 1990s, Louis-Dreyfus began a relationship with the German investor Nicole Junkermann, who was three decades younger than him, while he was still married to Bogdanova.

Louis-Dreyfus identified as an agnostic. The American actress Julia Louis-Dreyfus, known for her role in the television comedy series Seinfeld, is his second cousin.

Following his death, his enterprises were inherited and supervised by Margarita Louis-Dreyfus, she is considered to be the richest Russian woman today. Margarita inherited 60% of the organization (increased to 65% in 2012). Robert's two sisters, Monique Louis-Dreyfus Roosmale Nepveu and Marie-Jeanne Louis-Dreyfus Meyer, each own 12% and are now both billionaires.
