= André Gascard =

French footballer (1890–1969)

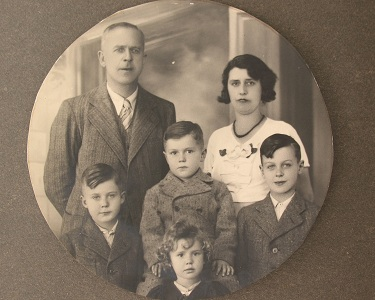
- Gascard with his wife and children in 1937

Personal information
- Date of birth: 16 November 1890
- Place of birth: Agen, France
- Date of death: 16 October 1969 (aged 78)
- Place of death: Marseille, France
- Position: Defender

Senior career*
Years	Team	Apps	(Gls)
- FC Sète
- Stade Helvétique de Marseille
1917–1919	Marseille		

Managerial career
- 1938–1939: Marseille
- 1941–1942: Marseille
- * Club domestic league appearances and goals

André Gascard (16 November 1890, – 16 October 1969) was a French football defender who played most of his career at Sète and Marseille.

== Biography ==
André Gascard was captain of the Olympique de Marseille team which reached the final of the 1919 USFSA Football Championship which Marseille lost 4–1 against Le Havre. OM managed great performances at the national level, although the range of national competitions at the time diminishes their achievements somewhat.

He became coach of the Marseille club in 1939 and 1941. He later became chairman, and then head archivist for OM.

Gascard was also the father of five children, including the artist Tibet.

== Honours ==
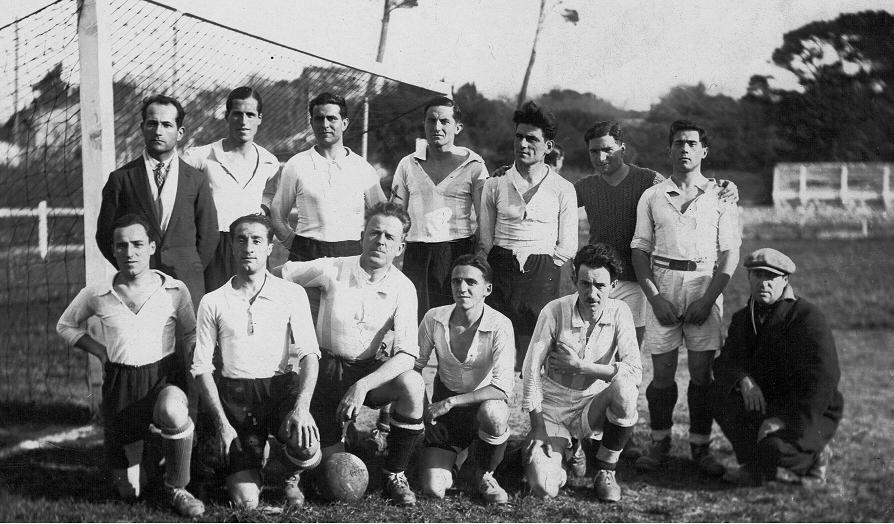
Gascard for Marseille (in first row, third from left)

Marseille

- USFSA Football Championship runner-up: 1919
