= José Anigo =

French footballer and manager (born 1961)

Personal information
- Date of birth: 15 April 1961 (age 65)
- Place of birth: Marseille, France
- Height: 1.83 m (6 ft 0 in)
- Position: Defender

Youth career
- 1972–1973: Cité Saint-Louis
- 1973–1975: Provence Sports
- 1975–1979: Marseille

Senior career*
| Years | Team | Apps | (Gls) |
| 1979–1987 | Marseille | 206 | (4) |
| 1987–1990 | Nîmes | 42 | (0) |
| 1990–1993 | Endoume | | |
| 1994–1996 | Endoume | | |
| Total | | 248 | (4) |

Managerial career
- 1995–1996: Endoume
- 1996–1997: Consolat
- 2001: Marseille
- 2003–2004: Marseille
- 2013–2014: Marseille
- 2015: ES Tunis
- 2017–2018: Levadiakos
- 2018: Panionios
- 2023: Olympiacos (caretaker)
- * Club domestic league appearances and goals

José Anigo (born 15 April 1961) is a French professional football manager and former player.

== Career ==
Anigo was born in Marseille, and after a tough childhood went on to play for his home town club for eight years where he established a reputation for being a tough defender. After that he became the coach for Marseillaise's youth team and latter went on to become coach from 2001 to 2005 leading the team to a runners up medal in the 2004 UEFA Cup Final. During his tenure he also signed many stars that would aid Marseille in the future such as playmaker Mathieu Valbuena, goalkeeper Steve Mandanda and defender Nicolas N'Koulou.

In October 2019, Anigo was hired as Head of International Recruitment for Nottingham Forest. He left the club in June 2020.

== Personal life ==
Born in France, Anigo's parents were Spanish Republicans on the run from Francisco Franco. In September 2013 Anigo's son Adrien Anigo was shot dead. Adrien had previously spent time in prison for robbery and became the fifteenth victim of gun violence in Marseille that year.

== Managerial Statistics ==
As of 25 January 2024

Managerial record by team and tenure
| Team | From | To | Record | | | | | Ref. |
| Team | From | To | P | W | D | L | Win % | Ref. |
|---|---|---|---|---|---|---|---|---|
| Marseille | 25 July 2001 | 24 August 2001 | 4 | 0 | 2 | 2 | 0.00 | |
| Marseille | 14 January 2004 | 22 November 2004 | 46 | 18 | 13 | 15 | 39.13 | |
| Marseille | 7 December 2013 | 14 May 2014 | 26 | 10 | 9 | 7 | 38.46 | |
| ES Tunis | June 2015 | August 2015 | 2 | 1 | 0 | 1 | 50.00 | |
| Levadiakos | July 2017 | June 2018 | 35 | 11 | 10 | 14 | 31.43 | |
| Panionios | July 2018 | December 2018 | 14 | 7 | 2 | 5 | 50.00 | |
| Olympiacos | April 2023 | Μay 2023 | 9 | 5 | 1 | 3 | 55.56 | |
