= Neuf Cegetel =

French telecommunications company

- Type: Wholly owned subsidiary
- Industry: Telecommunication
- Founded: 2005
- Headquarters: Boulogne Billancourt, France
- Key people: Jacques Veyrat (CEO), Philippe Cuverville, Michel Paulin (Deputy CEOs)
- Products: Fixed telephony, Mobile telephony, Broadband, Internet services, IPTV
- Revenue: EURO 3.38 billion (2007)
- Owner: SFR
- Website: neufcegetel.fr at the Wayback Machine (archived 2007-02-03)

Neuf Cegetel was a French wireline telecommunications service provider and a mobile virtual network operator (MVNO). It offered various telecommunications services to consumers, enterprises and wholesale customers, ranking second in the country in annual revenues. It was legally established in 2005 following the completion of the merger between Neuf Telecom (formerly known as LDCOM) and Cegetel. As of June 2008, the company became a wholly owned subsidiary of SFR, and the brand disappeared commercially.

== History ==
=== Origins ===
LDCOM (the future Neuf Telecom) was established by the Louis Dreyfus Group in 1998, at the time of telecommunications deregulation. At first it was present on the wholesale market only, providing services such as national and metro fiber networks, colocation and hosting centers to other operators and internet services providers, using its own network. Its main subsidiary, LD Cable, performed the engineering work, obtaining the necessary permits for the construction works, supplying and laying the fiber optic cables, and negotiating with local and regional authorities in France.

Cegetel was a separate company, established in 1996 as a subsidiary of Groupe SFR Cegetel, which combined a fixed line operator (Cegetel) and a wireless operator (SFR) established in 1987. Cegetel was France's second fixed-line operator, competing directly with France Telecom. It had about 2,000 employees and was using the network operated by "Telecom Development" (TD), a joint venture of Cegetel and the French railways, SNCF. It therefore had extensive network coverage in France, with 32,000 kilometers of fiber along France's railway lines and highways, fiber loops in metropolitan centers, and points of interconnection at the local exchange level. The larger of the two companies to be merged, Cegetel was well-established in the enterprise and wholesale markets with over 16,000 corporate clients.

=== Market consolidator in France ===
Unlike many (80+) loss-making alternative licensed operators in France, LDCOM was unaffected by the so-called telecoms crash in March 2000 because of its cautious and pragmatic overall approach. From 2000 to 2003, the French telecom services market went through a major consolidation. LDCOM acquired several alternate operators cheaply, including:

- Kertel (January 2001 – some of its customers and assets)
- Fortel (Squadron) (May 2001)
- Kaptech (December 2001)
- Belgacom France (March 2002)
- FirstMark France (May 2002)
- 9 Telecom, from Telecom Italia (August 2002)
- Ventelo France (October 2002)
- Siris, France's third largest operator, from Deutsche Telekom (May 2003)

With these acquisitions, in 2003 LDCOM became the number-three competitor to France Telecom across all segments: wholesale, enterprise and residential.

In 2003, Cegetel merged with "Telecom Development" (TD) and was 65% owned by Groupe SFR Cegetel and 35% by SNCF. Groupe SFR Cegetel was 56% owned by Vivendi Universal and 44% by Vodafone.

=== Mass market DSL deployment ===
In contrast with the North American market, DSL is the dominant broadband access technology in France, for several reasons: the penetration of cable systems has been relatively low; the incumbent operator France Telecom and the domestic telecom vendor Alcatel decided in the late 1990s that ADSL was strategically the best choice; and a favorable regulatory environment was subsequently offered to alternative operators for the implementation of Local Loop Unbundling (LLU).

France liberalised the long distance market in 1998, organised LLU trials with France Telecom in January 2000 and established a legal framework for LLU in early 2001, but in practice there was no real possibility for alternative operators to be profitable in the broadband access market until 2003–2004. France Telecom's tariffs and technical conditions then became progressively more attractive, encouraging several alternative operators, including Free Telecom (Iliad Group) and LDCOM, to invest massively in ADSL infrastructure. In 2004, LDCOM was renamed Neuf Telecom ("N9uf Telecom") and launched its first Triple Play service for the consumer market using this technology, which produced very strong growth.

Cegetel was amongst the first participants of LLU trials in January 2000, but subsequently slowed or froze its investments in LLU, claiming the market and regulatory conditions in France were not acceptable. It chose to offer DSL services by means of France Telecom's wholesale offer. In a second stage, it announced a plan to invest EUR300 million in LLU, but the decision was probably too late. Wanadoo, the Internet subsidiary of France Telecom, Free Telecom (Iliad Group) and LDCOM gained a considerable head start and captured significant market shares.

=== Further consolidation and IPO ===
Cegetel's revenues from the traditional services market were declining, and the group arrived late on the DSL market. In August 2005, Neuf Telecom and its rival Cegetel merged to create Neuf Cegetel. It was the signal for further consolidation among operators and ISPs in France. In October 2006, Neuf Cegetel announced that French competition authorities had approved the acquisition of AOL, France's internet access business, which had 505,000 customers. To aid its expansion program and accelerate the roll-out of broadband services, The Neuf Cegetel Group made an initial public offering (IPO) of its stock on the French Euronext exchange in October 2006. It was oversubscribed nearly 15 times. In July 2007, Neuf Cegetel announced that French competition authorities had approved the acquisition of T-Online France (also known as "Club Internet"). At the end of September 2007, the group had 3.12 million broadband Internet clients, up 56% from two million a year earlier.

=== Major FTTH investments ===
In 2006-2007 several service providers, including France Telecom (Orange), Free Telecom (Iliad Group), Noos Numericable and Neuf Cegetel, announced plans to roll out FTTH services in major population centers in France. To make such investments pay off, a large number of customers were needed. As described in the previous section, Neuf Cegetel acquired several ADSL-based triple play operators to increase its market share and became the second-largest broadband operator in France after France Telecom (Orange).

In January 2007, Neuf Cegetel purchased Mediafibre (3,000 customers), a small regional fiber-based triple play operator in Pau, Pyrénées-Atlantiques, southwest France. This operator operated a famous municipal FTTH project called "Pau Broadbandcity" and therefore brought strong expertise in this area to Neuf Cegetel.

In February 2007, Neuf Cegetel took control of Erenis, an alternate service provider which had been laying fiber in Paris since 2003 and had more than 10,000 customers.

In April 2007, Neuf Cegetel announced that its FTTH-based triple play offering was available to 55,000 households in Paris, with internet access at speeds up to 50 Mbit/s for a headline price of €29.90 ($40.75) per month. Neuf Cegetel announced plans to invest €300 million ($408 million) in 2007, 2008 and 2009 to exceed 1 million homes in Paris and other cities and sign up 250,000 customers.

LD Collectivités, a Neuf Cegetel subsidiary specializing in local government networks, was selected for the first public service contract to develop a FTTH network in the Paris region.

=== WiMax ===
LD Collectivités, in partnership with HDDR, announced the roll-out of WiMax services in the Haut Rhin department and launched a WiMax network in the Loiret department. Through their joint venture SHD, SFR and Neuf Cegetel have announced plans to roll out a WiMax network in the region of Île-de-France.

=== Fixed mobile convergence and the 3G market ===
Unlike other European countries, which have four or five mobile operators, France has only three: Orange, SFR and Bouygues Telecom, which are also the only ones to have a 3G license. In December 2006, the Court of Appeal approved the initial decision of the "Conseil de la Concurrence" (an administrative authority that regulates competition) and confirmed that Orange, SFR and Bouygues Telecom would have to pay 256, 220 and 58 million euros respectively, because of collusion. The National Regulatory Authority Arcep reopened the bidding for a fourth 3G license, but rejected the sole bid from fixed broadband access provider Free Telecom (Iliad Group) because it failed to meet the required financial conditions, which were the same for new applicants as for the three holders. In November 2007, the French Senate approved an amendment to the country's budget bill for 2008 to allow the government to change the financial conditions for assigning the fourth license. In December 2007, Vivendi's SFR mobile phone division, which owns 40.5% of Neuf Cegetel, offered to buy the rest for €4.5 billion, intending to challenge France Telecom in the market for combined fixed-line, internet and cellphone services and to create "the biggest, strongest non-incumbent in Europe". The acquisition was completed on 24 June 2008.

== About the name "Neuf" ==
"Neuf" in French is the number nine. It is also the "indirect access" prefix code granted in 1998 by the National Regulatory Authority to Telecom Italia ("9 Telecom"), which was subsequently acquired by LDCOM.

The prefix code "9" is dialled by switched voice customers before the destination number when they place calls from a different access network (France Telecom) and when they want to select Neuf Cegetel as the preferred operator. Because customers tend to forget to dial the prefix code, a reminder was included in most advertisements and the number was integrated into the brand name and logo ("9 Telecom", "N9uf Telecom", "N9uf Cegetel"). "Neuf" also means "brand new".

Today, "indirect access" is a marginal and declining business in France.

== Main services ==
=== Residential segment ===
According to Neuf Cegetel's 2007 annual report, the Mass Market division generated revenue of €1.437 billion, or 42% of the Group's total revenue of €3.348 billion, mainly from the following products:

- "Neuf Box": customer-premises equipment that works with different broadband access technologies to provide customers in the larger urban areas of France with high-speed internet access and landline phone services, bypassing France Telecom's traditional phone services by using voice over broadband (VoIP), and pushing them to launch similar services.
- "Neuf TV": Digital Television packages provided by connecting the Neuf Box to a separate HD decoder using HomePlug powerline bridges.
- "Neuf Mobile": GSM telephone services provided through an MVNO agreement with SFR.

In this segment, the group competed primarily with:

- Fixed services: France Telecom (Orange), Free (Iliad Group), Alice (Telecom Italia) and Numericable.
- Mobile services: France Telecom (Orange) and Bouygues Telecom.

=== Enterprises segment ===
According to the 2007 annual report, the Enterprises division generated revenue of €1.039 billion, or 31% of the Group's total revenue of €3.348 billion, mainly from the following products:

- IP services: broadband internet access, IP VPN ("9 Ipnet").
- "9Office": a multiservice offer targeting small and medium enterprises (20-250 employees) and multi-site enterprise segments, based on a VoIP-enabled multiservice router (OneAccess).
- "9office Mobile": GSM telephone services provided through an MVNO agreement with SFR.
- "9Pass": a multiservice offer targeting small businesses (3-20 employees) using customer-premises equipment to deliver basic IP PBX voice features, LAN and Internet services, managed by Neuf Cegetel or a partner.
- "9 Ipnet ToIP": a managed IP PBX offer coupled with IP VPN and SIP trunking services targeting government and large enterprises.
- Connectivity and legacy voice services: Leased lines, Indirect access, direct access, special numbers, etc.

At the end of December 2007, 173,000 business access links were connected to Neuf Cegetel's network, representing an annual increase of 34,000. The "9office" VoIP offer in particular accounted for close to 40% of new data links during the 4th quarter of 2007.

In this segment, the group competed primarily with:

- Fixed services: Orange Business Services, Bouygues Telecom, Completel, COLT Telecom Group, Verizon Business and BT.
- Mobile services: France Telecom (Orange) and Bouygues Telecom.

=== Wholesale segment ===
According to the 2007 annual report, the Wholesale division generated revenue of €871M, or 26% of the Group's total revenue of €3.348 billion, mainly with the following products provided to other service providers and ISPs: ADSL wholesale, IP peering, PSTN interconnect and call termination, hosting etc. This historical activity had experienced a decline linked to the discontinuation of wholesale sales to AOL and Club Internet following the Group's acquisition of these ISPs, the contraction in the traditional switched voice business, the decline of dial-up Internet business and the end of the GSM gateway business.

In this segment, the group competed primarily with France Telecom, Completel and Telecom Italia.
