= József Zilisy =

Hungarian-Italian footballer and manager

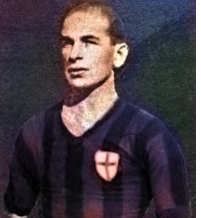

Personal information
- Date of birth: 21 February 1899
- Place of birth: Budapest, Austria-Hungary
- Date of death: 2 March 1982 (aged 83)
- Place of death: Acqui Terme, Italy
- Position: Striker

Senior career*
Years	Team	Apps	(Gls)
–	Budapest TC		
–	FC Katowice		
–	Admira Wien		
1929–1930	Milan	1	(0)
1930–1931	Carrarese		

Managerial career
- 1932–1933: Arezzo
- 1935–1936: Benevento
- 1936–1937: Pistoiese
- 1937–1938: Szeged
- 1938–1939: Sambenedettese
- 1939–1941: Calcio Schio 1905
- 1942–1943: Carpi
- 1943–1944: Toulouse
- 1947–1949: Marseille
- 1958: Marseille
- * Club domestic league appearances and goals

József Zilisy, also known as Giuseppe Zilizzi or Joseph Zilizzi (21 February 1899 – 2 March 1982) was a Hungarian-Italian footballer and football manager.
