= Frank McCourt (executive) =

American businessman (born 1953)

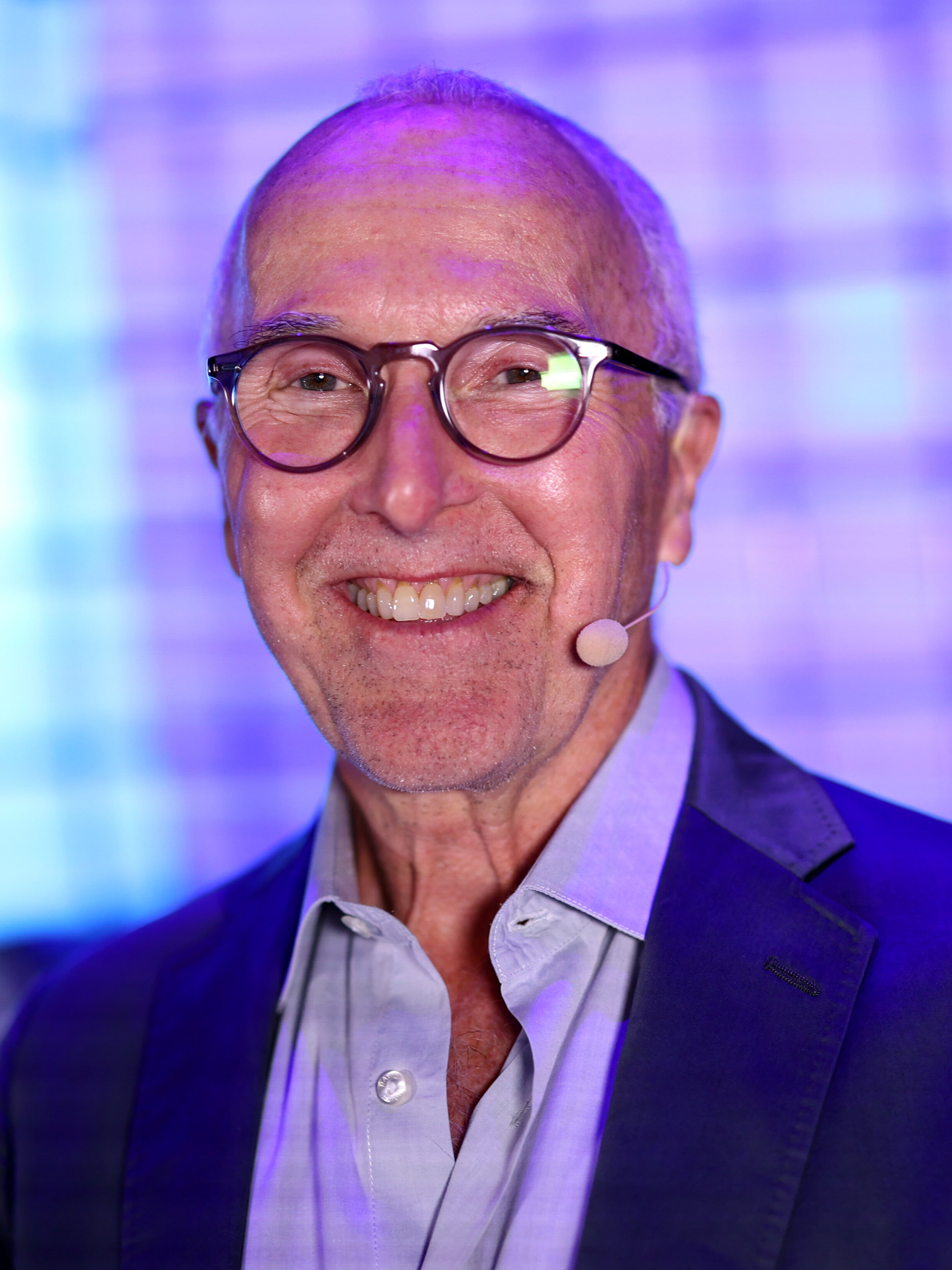
- McCourt in 2024
- Born: Frank H. McCourt Jr. August 14, 1953 (age 73); Boston, Massachusetts, U.S.
- Education: Georgetown University
- Occupations: Executive Chairman of McCourt Global; Founder & Executive Chairman of Project Liberty; Owner of Olympique de Marseille; Owner of Los Angeles Marathon
- Years active: 1977–present
- Spouses: Jamie McCourt (m. 1979; div. 2011) Monica Algarra (m. 2015)
- Children: 8

Frank H. McCourt Jr. (born August 14, 1953) is an American business executive and philanthropist. As of 2023, he is the executive chairman and former CEO of McCourt Global, owner of French football club Olympique de Marseille and founder and executive chairman of international non-profit Project Liberty. He was the owner and chairman of the Los Angeles Dodgers and Dodger Stadium from 2004 to 2012.

In 2004, he purchased a controlling interest in the Dodgers from Fox Entertainment Group, owned by Rupert Murdoch's News Corporation. Prior to purchasing the Dodgers and moving to Los Angeles, McCourt was a Boston real estate developer, whose family resided in Brookline, Massachusetts.

In 2013, he donated $100 million to establish the McCourt School of Public Policy, the ninth school of Georgetown University. He made a second $100 million gift to Georgetown University in March 2021, for the express purpose of ensuring that "the McCourt School can open its doors more widely and build a pipeline of future public policy leaders that reflects the true diversity of our communities."

In 2016, McCourt entered exclusive negotiations for the takeover of French Ligue 1 football club Olympique Marseille from Russian-born billionaire Margarita Louis-Dreyfus. The negotiations reached completion in October with a press conference officializing the news.

In 2021, he founded the non-profit Project Liberty. The initiative has multiple components which includes the development of the Decentralized Social Networking Protocol (DSNP), the founding of the McCourt Institute with founding academic partners Georgetown University in Washington, D.C. and Sciences Po in Paris and a network of partners within the Unfinished network.

In 2023, he transitioned from CEO of McCourt Global to executive chairman and announced Shéhérazade Semsar-de Boisséson, former POLITICO Europe CEO, as McCourt Global's CEO.

On March 12, 2024, McCourt's first book, Our Biggest Fight: Reclaiming Liberty, Humanity and Dignity in the Digital Age, was released by Crown Publishing Group.

In 2024, he announced plans to build a consortium to buy TikTok. A year later in May 2025, McCourt said that he and the consortium's other backers remained "on standby" regarding a $20 billion offer to buy the social media platform.

McCourt is the founder and chairman of the Premier Jumping League (PJL), which launched in March 2026. The PJL is a show jumping competition where riders selected on merit will compete against one another in events hosted around the world, including Europe, North America, and the Middle East. McCourt and McCourt Global are backing the PJL's guaranteed $300 million prize pot.

== Early years and business background ==
McCourt was born in Boston, Massachusetts. He was raised as a Catholic and attended Georgetown University, where he earned an economics degree in 1975. He met his future wife, Jamie Luskin, when they were both freshmen at Georgetown. They married in 1979. The McCourt family has a long association with real estate and construction in the Boston area.

In 1977, McCourt stopped working for his father's road contracting company and founded The McCourt Company, which specialized in the development of major commercial real estate projects. The McCourt Company developed multiple condominiums in Boston, including the first and most notable development, the Union Wharf Condominium on Boston Harbor. McCourt later purchased a 24-acre plot of the Boston Seaport and played a role in the development of what became the South Boston Seaport District.

The McCourt Company headquarters moved to Los Angeles in 2004 in connection with the family relocating to Los Angeles. The McCourts owned a $16 million, 13,000 sq ft (1,200 m^{2}) home in Brookline, Massachusetts, that was acquired by John W. Henry, the new owner of the Boston Red Sox.

== Sport investments ==
=== Failed Red Sox bid ===
Before buying the Los Angeles Dodgers, McCourt made a bid to buy the Boston Red Sox, planning to build a new stadium on the land he owned and used for parking lots on the South Boston waterfront. Instead, the Red Sox were sold in 2002 to John W. Henry, Tom Werner and Red Sox president Larry Lucchino.

=== Los Angeles Dodgers ===
==== Purchase of the L.A. Dodgers ====
In 2004, McCourt bought the Los Angeles Dodgers for US$430 million from News Corporation, Rupert Murdoch's flagship enterprise. McCourt's purchase of the Dodgers was financed mostly by debt.

In 2004, McCourt's South Boston parking lot property was used as collateral for some of the financing to acquire the Dodgers from NewsCorp. Later, the South Boston property was turned over to NewsCorp in exchange for canceling acquisition debt. NewsCorp received approximately $200 million when they re-sold the property to Morgan Stanley and Boston real estate investor John B. Hynes III in 2006.

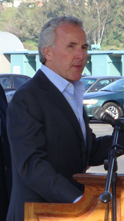
Frank McCourt in 2010

The Dodgers assets acquired by McCourt included significant real estate assets related to the stadium in Chavez Ravine, including stadium parking lot land. Plans were announced for new real estate developments at Dodger Stadium; however, those plans never came to fruition. One discussed plan was for an NFL stadium and adjacent retail complex. However, after the Boston Herald reported the details of the plan, political pressure forced both the NFL and McCourt to deny that either party was aggressively pursuing the idea.

To offset the purchase, McCourt raised ticket and concession prices every year. By April 2009, the team and its related assets, in which McCourt had invested heavily in improvements, had increased in value to $722 million according to Forbes. In 2010, the value of the team was estimated at $727 million according to Forbes.

==== Hiring and firing of Paul DePodesta ====
In 2003, under NewsCorp ownership, the Dodgers' record was 85 wins and 77 losses. Shortly after purchasing the team, McCourt fired then general manager Dan Evans, replacing him with Paul DePodesta. DePodesta is featured (along with Billy Beane) in the book Moneyball, as it discussed their sabermetric-based approach to using statistics to build the Oakland A's. In Los Angeles, DePodesta made a trade in the middle of the 2004 season that sent the Dodgers' starting catcher, Paul Lo Duca, its set-up man, pitcher Guillermo Mota and outfielder Juan Encarnación to the Florida Marlins for the high on-base percentage first baseman Hee-Seop Choi, power pitcher Brad Penny and pitching prospect Bill Murphy, who was in turn flipped with Koyie Hill and Reggie Abercrombie to the Arizona Diamondbacks for Gold Glove center fielder Steve Finley and catcher Brent Mayne. At the time, DePodesta said of Choi: "I think we've acquired one of the better offensive players in the league."

Finley hit 13 home runs for the Dodgers in his two months with the team. Choi batted .161 with no home runs for the Dodgers after the trade, though he walked eleven times in 87 plate appearances. In the playoff loss to St. Louis that season, Penny did not play, Choi had one at bat (hitless) and Dodger catchers were 3-for-10.

In 2004, the Dodgers won the NL West with a record of 93-69, but lost in four games to the St. Louis Cardinals in the Divisional Series. In the offseason, the Dodgers decided not to re-sign Adrián Beltré due to his high contract demands (Beltre finished second in the NL MVP voting and would later sign with Seattle for 5 years/$64 million). DePodesta signed outfielder J. D. Drew for five years at $55 million, sinkerball pitcher Derek Lowe for four years at $36 million, and All-Star second baseman Jeff Kent.

However, the 2005 season, with a record of 71–91, was the Dodgers' second-worst record since moving to Los Angeles, due in part to players' injuries. That offseason, manager Jim Tracy was fired. Soon after Tracy was fired, McCourt fired DePodesta and about a month later, hired Ned Colletti to replace him.

==== Ned Colletti/Joe Torre era ====
Ned Colletti's first action as GM was the signing of the former Red Sox manager, Grady Little. Colletti then signed several veteran players such as Rafael Furcal, Nomar Garciaparra, Kenny Lofton and Bill Mueller. These players were among those who led the 2006 Dodgers to the NL Wild Card spot, with an 88–74 record. The Dodgers were swept by the New York Mets in the National League Division Series. In the winter of 2006–07 the team signed Juan Pierre, Jason Schmidt, and Luis Gonzalez.

In October 2007, Grady Little resigned and Joe Torre was hired as their new manager. In 2008, with Torre, Ned Colletti signed Andruw Jones, Hiroki Kuroda and Chan Ho Park. During the trade deadline, the Dodgers acquired Manny Ramirez in a trade with the Boston Red Sox.

In 2007, Dr. Charles Steinberg was hired as executive vice president, marketing and public relations, of the Dodgers after working with the Boston Red Sox and Baltimore Orioles. In 2009, he was reported to be on his way out and was said to be allied with Jamie McCourt and had lost influence as she did, according to a report in the Los Angeles Times.

==== Dodgers' Dream Foundation ====
In 2010, it was revealed that then California Attorney General Jerry Brown was opening an investigation into the Dodgers' charitable foundation, the Dodgers' Dream Foundation. According to tax returns, the charity's chief executive, Howard Sunkin, earned a salary of nearly $400,000 per year, almost a quarter of the foundation's entire budget. Sunkin is a close associate of McCourt and has worked with him during his divorce proceedings. The courts eventually awarded the funds to be repaid, and McCourt personally repaid $100,000.

==== Divorce proceedings ====
On October 14, 2009, it was announced the McCourts would be separating after nearly 30 years of marriage. While speculation was raised on the impact upon the McCourt family and Dodger ownership, a spokesperson for Jamie McCourt said the following day that "the focus of the Dodgers is on the playoffs and the World Series." Jamie was fired from her position as Dodgers CEO on Thursday, October 22, 2009, the day after the Dodgers were eliminated from the playoffs. She officially filed for divorce shortly thereafter. He has claimed that the divorce has "no bearing on the team whatsoever."

On December 7, 2010, the judge in the divorce case of the McCourts invalidated the post-nuptial marital property agreement ("MPA") that Frank McCourt had claimed provided him with sole ownership of the Dodgers. In the wake of this decision, Frank McCourt's lawyers said that Frank would use other legal avenues to establish his sole ownership of the Dodgers, while Jamie McCourt's lawyers said that Jamie would be confirmed as the co-owner of the team as community property of their marriage.

On June 17, 2011, the McCourts reached agreement on a settlement of their divorce. The settlement was contingent upon Major League Baseball approving a 17-year television contract between the Dodgers and Fox Sports West and Prime Ticket. The discussion set aside the Dodgers' ownership issue until a scheduled one-day trial on August 4, whereupon if the judge sided with Frank he would keep the team and pay a settlement fee to Jamie and if the judge sided with her the team would be sold. However, on June 20, baseball rejected the television deal and the settlement agreement fell apart.

On October 17, 2011, the McCourts reached a settlement in their divorce case, whereby Jamie would receive about $130 million and relinquish her claim on the Dodgers. This ended what is widely believed to be the costliest divorce in California history.

==== Ownership dispute with Major League Baseball: Bankruptcy and sale of the Dodgers ====
In April 2011, MLB Commissioner Bud Selig announced that as part of an MLB investigation into McCourt's stewardship of the Dodgers, he would be appointing a representative to oversee the team's day-to-day operations. In effect, the commissioner's office seized control of the team. His statement said that he took that action because of his "deep concerns for the finances and operations" of the Dodgers. This event occurred shortly after an LA Times report that McCourt had obtained a personal loan from Fox to cover the team's payroll for April and May. McCourt vigorously disputed MLB's actions. Nevertheless, Selig appointed former diplomat and former Texas Rangers executive Tom Schieffer to oversee the Dodgers' finances. On June 27, the Dodgers filed for Chapter 11 Bankruptcy protection.

After much legal wrangling between McCourt's lawyers and MLB lawyers in bankruptcy court, he reached a deal with the league to put the team up for sale. On March 27, 2012, he agreed to sell the team to a group consisting of former Los Angeles Lakers star Magic Johnson, former baseball executive Stan Kasten and the Guggenheim Partners for a record price of $2 billion, the highest ever for a professional sports team. McCourt separately sold the land surrounding the stadium for $150 million to the same group, while maintaining some economic interest in the property. According to the Guggenheim Group, McCourt has no control or influence over the land, but will profit from potential future development of it. Also, the new ownership pays $14 million to rent the parking lots surrounding Dodger Stadium from an entity half-owned by McCourt. The sale officially closed on May 1, 2012, ending McCourt's turbulent period as Dodgers owner.

=== Los Angeles Marathon ===
In 2008, McCourt bought the operating rights to the Los Angeles Marathon. McCourt's group changed the route of the Marathon so that it would start at Dodger Stadium. His "Stadium to the Sea" course revitalized the Marathon and in 2010 it drew the largest field in the history of the race. During his divorce, he briefly considered selling the Marathon, but he chose to retain the rights and refocus on the race.

McCourt announced in 2019 that he would donate the Los Angeles Marathon and parent company Conqur Endurance to The McCourt Foundation, a Boston-based philanthropic organization overseen by his cousin, Brian McCourt. The vision for combining the entities was to catalyze the social impact potential of both organizations by creating a bicoastal portfolio of events that promote healthier communities. The McCourt Foundation is "dedicated to enhancing the lives of patients and families affected by health-challenges within the neurology community and beyond," and hosts several endurance sport events to raise funds and awareness for neurological health.

=== Global Champions Tour ===
In 2014, McCourt bought 50% of the Global Champions Tour.

In 2017, Frank and Monica McCourt founded a show jumping team, the Miami Celtics.

In March 2022, Jan Tops acquired McCourt's share and once again became the sole owner of Global Champions Tour. McCourt franchised the equestrian show jumping team Miami Celtics team for the 2022 spring season.

=== Premier Jumping League ===
In March 2026, McCourt founded the Premier Jumping League (PJL), an international show jumping competition backed by McCourt Global. It features 16 teams competing at 14 venues across Europe, North America, and the Middle East. The league introduces a new rider selection process and a guaranteed $300 million prize pot. The PJL's inaugural season is scheduled to run from March to October 2027.

=== Olympique de Marseille ===
==== Purchase of Olympique de Marseille ====
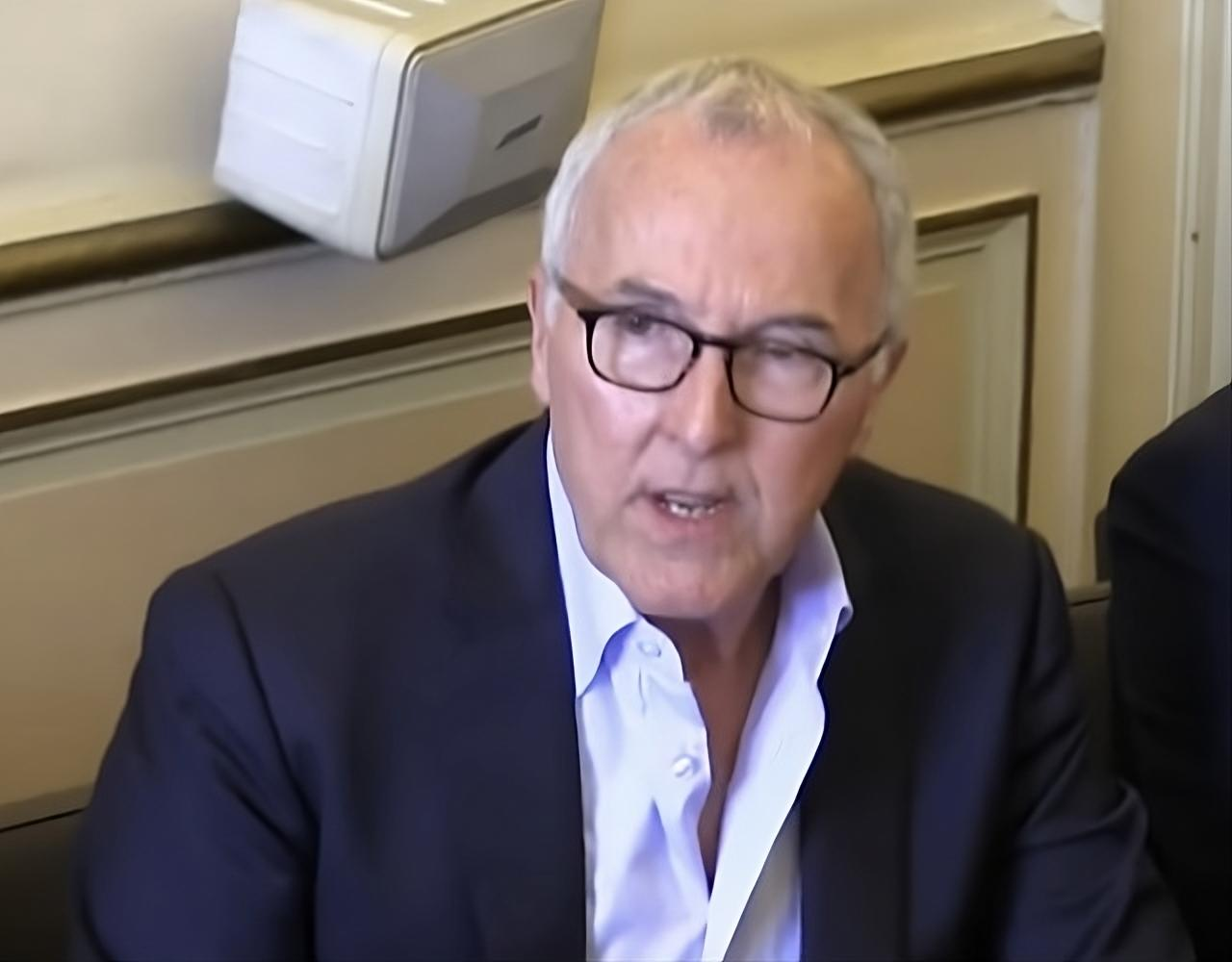
McCourt during his presentation to the media on August 29, 2016.

On August 29, 2016, McCourt entered exclusive negotiations to purchase the French Ligue 1 club Olympique de Marseille from Margarita Louis-Dreyfus. The purchase deal was completed for an undisclosed price tag of around €50 million on October 17, 2016. He pledged to invest €200 million in the club over the next four years. Upon his arrival at Marseille, he appointed Jacques-Henri Eyraud, a former director of communications of the Euro Disney group, as the new president of the club. On October 20, Rudi Garcia was officially appointed new coach and a week later Andoni Zubizarreta new sports director.

For the first transfer window in the McCourt era in January 2017, Marseille reinforced the team with the acquisition of Dimitri Payet, Patrice Evra, Morgan Sanson and Grégory Sertic, for a total of around €45M in transfer fees.

==== End of Eyraud presidency and start of Longoria era ====
On February 26, 2021, following months of defiance towards then OM president Jacques-Henri Eyraud's approach, protests of fans at the club's training ground pushed McCourt to endorse sporting director Pablo Longoria at the presidency of the club. The same day, Jorge Sampaoli is appointed as new head coach in place of André Villas-Boas.

==== Opposition to the European Super League ====
In April 2021, McCourt came out publicly against the proposed European Super League. In an op-ed in newspaper Le Monde, he drew a direct parallel between the opaque centralization of power in both the domains of football and technology, stating that: "We need to think of our institutions not as purely profit-seeking enterprises designed to funnel money and influence to a monopolistic private few but as part of a larger ecosystem that impacts the public good."

== Project Liberty ==
In 2021, McCourt announced $100 million funding for an initiative called Project Liberty, with the intention to "construct a new internet infrastructure." The investment first went into funding the development of Decentralized Social Networking Protocol (DSNP), which is an open source code that developers can use to build social apps and services. It also included the founding of a "digital governance" institution called McCourt Institute at Georgetown University in Washington, D.C., and Sciences Po in Paris, to support research on "technology that serves the common good" and public discussions that aim to "influence the direction taken by technology and its players," according to McCourt in an interview with Usbek & Rica. The effort has a multi-track approach, beyond the focus on technology in the beginning; it is building on other components including governance, policy, and movement.

In 2022, McCourt appointed Martina Larkin as Project Liberty's first CEO.

=== Technology ===
McCourt founded Unfinished, and Amplica Labs (formerly known as Unfinished Labs), its technology research and development arm, in 2020. The first project of Amplica Labs—the introduction of the open-source Decentralized Social Networking Protocol (DSNP)—became the foundation of Project Liberty.

MeWe, a social media platform that describes itself as being privacy-focused, became the first platform to pledge support by migrating its platform to DSNP in September 2022.

=== McCourt Institute ===
In June 2021, Frank McCourt announced the creation of the McCourt Institute as the newest branch of Unfinished. The two foundational partners of the institute are Georgetown University in Washington, DC, and Sciences Po in Paris.

The McCourt Institute building was unveiled at Sciences Po in March 2022, on the occasion of the university's 150th anniversary.

At the McCourt Institute's inaugural event on Sciences Po's campus, McCourt announced the funding of $2.3 million to Georgetown and Sciences Po faculty to select grantees, furthering scholarship from Georgetown specialists in digital governance. Georgetown later announced the 2022 recipients of grantees, including 28 researchers and 17 projects.

The McCourt Institute also provided funding for Frances Haugen's nonprofit, Beyond the Screen, as Haugen announced at Unfinished Live 2022. Haugen received funding from Project Liberty for a "Duty of Care" initiative, aimed at studying harms and identifying practices to deter them.

=== Unfinished ===
Unfinished Network

Unfinished is an organization that focuses on bringing together a network of partners that includes nonprofits and advocacy organizations, and hosts events, including Unfinished Live and Unfinished Camp which took place in Venice in April 2022, to support Project Liberty goals.

Unfinished Live

The first initiative of the Unfinished Network was Unfinished Live, a four-episode digital event series which debuted in 2020.

The second annual Unfinished Live was held in-person in New York City from September 23–25, 2021. The event theme was "The Future is Decentralized". The event was hosted at The Shed, a cultural center in Manhattan which Frank McCourt donated $45 million to at its inception. The event was a convening of Unfinished's network partners and speakers that included journalists, technologists, and artists, together with host Baratunde Thurston. The event included a free public exhibit by artist Refik Anadol, titled "Project Liberty Experience" after the founding initiative of Unfinished. The exhibit intended audiences to "experience a world where you own and control your data."

In September 2022, Unfinished hosted the third annual event in New York City. It once again hosted a "Project Liberty Experience," an immersive installation by artist Refik Anadol. The three day event took place September 22–24, 2022, with an additional "Day Zero" event on September 21 which included the convening of a Student Assembly consisting of participants—15 from Sciences Po in Paris and 15 from Georgetown University in Washington, D.C.—who were selected from more than 550 applicants.

=== The People's Bid for TikTok ===
Following the April 24, 2024 signing of the Protecting Americans from Foreign Adversary Controlled Applications Act, which prohibits foreign adversary controlled applications from being hosted in the United States, Project Liberty launched "The People's Bid for TikTok" in May 2024. Working with Guggenheim Securities as banker and law firm Kirkland & Ellis, the announcement cited a "goal of placing people and data empowerment at the center of the platform’s design and purpose". The bid included endorsements from Sir Tim Berners-Lee, inventor of the World Wide Web, and David D. Clark, a senior research scientist at the MIT Computer Science and Artificial Intelligence Laboratory. In an appearance on CBS' Face the Nation, McCourt shared that The People's Bid would not purchase the app's proprietary algorithm, which TikTok parent company ByteDance said it will not sell, and McCourt has stated Project Liberty meets antitrust regulations and other criteria set by the United States Supreme Court. In January 2025, Kevin O'Leary, an investor known for his appearances on Shark Tank, revealed that he was joining The People's Bid consortium. Ahead of the original divestment deadline, Project Liberty delivered an official offer for TikTok to ByteDance through the companies' bankers. Following President Donald Trump's executive order extending the divestment deadline by 75 days, McCourt told CNBC that Project Liberty would be open to sharing ownership of the app, if the terms abided the law and allowed the platform to be posted on DSNP technology developed by the organization.

== Land development ==
Entities affiliated with McCourt Partners submitted plans to the City of Los Angeles in 2023 for several apartment complexes in the Chinatown neighborhood adjacent to Dodger Stadium.

== Personal life ==
McCourt's grandfather was part-owner of the Boston Braves along with Lou Perini and others. Inspired by his grandfather and the others' formation of the Jimmy Fund, McCourt started ThinkCure to fight cancer.

McCourt was formerly married to Jamie McCourt. In 2015, McCourt was married to Monica Algarra. McCourt has eight children.

McCourt owns homes in Mashpee and Cotuit, Massachusetts.

Business positions
Preceded by Robert A. Daly	Chairman of the Los Angeles Dodgers; 2004–2012	Succeeded by Mark Walter
Preceded by Margarita Louis-Dreyfus	Owner of Olympique Marseille; 2016–present	Current holder
