= Rudi Garcia =

French football manager (born 1964)

- Garcia in 2026

Personal information
- Full name: Rudi José Garcia
- Date of birth: 20 February 1964 (age 62)
- Place of birth: Nemours, France
- Height: 1.80 m (5 ft 11 in)
- Position: Midfielder

Youth career
- 1970–1979: Corbeil-Essonnes
- 1979–1982: Viry-Châtillon
- 1982–1983: Lille

Senior career*
Years	Team	Apps	(Gls)
1983–1988	Lille	64	(4)
1988–1991	Caen	57	(1)
1991–1992	Martigues	15	(0)
1994–1996	Corbeil-Essonnes		
Total		134+	(5+)

Managerial career
- 1994–1998: Corbeil-Essonnes
- 2001: Saint-Étienne
- 2002–2007: Dijon
- 2007–2008: Le Mans
- 2008–2013: Lille
- 2013–2016: Roma
- 2016–2019: Marseille
- 2019–2021: Lyon
- 2022–2023: Al Nassr
- 2023: Napoli
- 2025–2026: Belgium
- * Club domestic league appearances and goals

Rudi José Garcia (French pronunciation: [ʁydi gaʁsja]; Spanish pronunciation: [ˈruði ɣaɾˈθi.a]; (Note: In isolation, Garcia is pronounced [ɡaɾˈθi.a]) born 20 February 1964) is a French professional football manager and former player who was most recently the head coach of the Belgium national team.

Garcia began his professional career with Lille, and went on to have stints with multiple other French sides. As a manager, he has coached clubs including Lille, Roma, Marseille, Lyon, Al Nassr, and Napoli. Garcia was named the head coach of Belgium in 2025.

== Early life ==
Rudi Garcia's father, José, was a Spanish expatriate who played football at a professional level in France for Sedan and Dunkerque. His grandparents had left Andalusia for the Ardennes region during the Spanish Civil War. Garcia is named after German cyclist Rudi Altig.

Between 1992 and 1994, Garcia was enrolled in university, and gained a DEUG and a STAPS degree at Orsay, as well as French qualifications that entitled him to manage a youth training centre.

== Club career ==
When José Garcia became the coach of local team Corbeil-Essonnes, he drafted his son into the squad, where Rudi played until cadet level. As Corbeil-Essonnes did not have a national cadets side, Rudi joined the Viry-Châtillon team. He was 18 when he obtained his baccalauréat and signed for Lille, where he would spend two years as an intern and four as part of the professional squad.

Playing as an attacking midfielder, Garcia's first goal for Lille was a notable affair. In December 1984, Lille travelled to the Parc des Princes to face Paris Saint-Germain. With both sides tied at 2–2, Garcia netted to earn his side a win over the Parisian club.

After Lille, Garcia joined Caen, where he was coached by Robert Nouzaret and Daniel Jeandupeux. In 1991, he opted to join Martigues rather than signing on with the Normandy club. Serious injuries to his back and knee forced him to retire from professional football at the age of 28, in 1992.

== Managerial career ==
=== Early career ===
In 1995, Garcia returned to Corbeil to manage the Division d'Honneur side with two months remaining in the season. He guided the club out of relegation. Then, in the seasons that followed, one ended with the club in mid-table and another in a second-place finish.

Between 1994 and 1996, Garcia acted as player-manager for the club before taking on managerial duties only between 1996 and 1998.

In the late 1990s, for two years he was a physio. Then, he became a scout, studying opponents and assisting in the elaboration of Saint-Étienne's tactics. Gradually, his role shifted to that of an assistant coach, a position he occupied alongside Nouzaret as from July 2000 and John Toshack afterwards.

In early 2001, when Toshack returned to Spain, Garcia took over first-team duties in collaboration with Jean-Guy Wallemme. Les Verts were then in the midst of a miserable season. Poor performances on the pitch were compounded by the club's implication in various affairs involving forged passports. The Garcia/Wallemme duo failed to reverse the trend and, in May 2001, Saint-Étienne were effectively relegated to the French second division. The following month, Wallemme left the club while Garcia was fired in August 2001. The two men, a decade later, would manage Lens and Lille respectively.

Garcia resumed his activities as a football pundit. At the same time, he was passing his Diplôme d'Entraineur Professionel de Football, the French equivalent of the professional coaching badge. In the spring of 2002, he was contacted by Dijon and signed with them on 21 May 2002. He helped the club to climb to Ligue 2 in 2003–04. The Bourgogne club even appeared in the semi-final of the Coupe de France, where Châteauroux defeated it 2–0.

In June 2007, Garcia left Dijon for Le Mans, another club he set on to transform in just one season. With players such as Romaric, Marko Baša and Yohann Pelé, the Sarthe club played some pleasant football which brought results as well. Le Mans ended in ninth position of Ligue 1 standings and reached the Coupe de la Ligue semi-final.

=== Lille ===
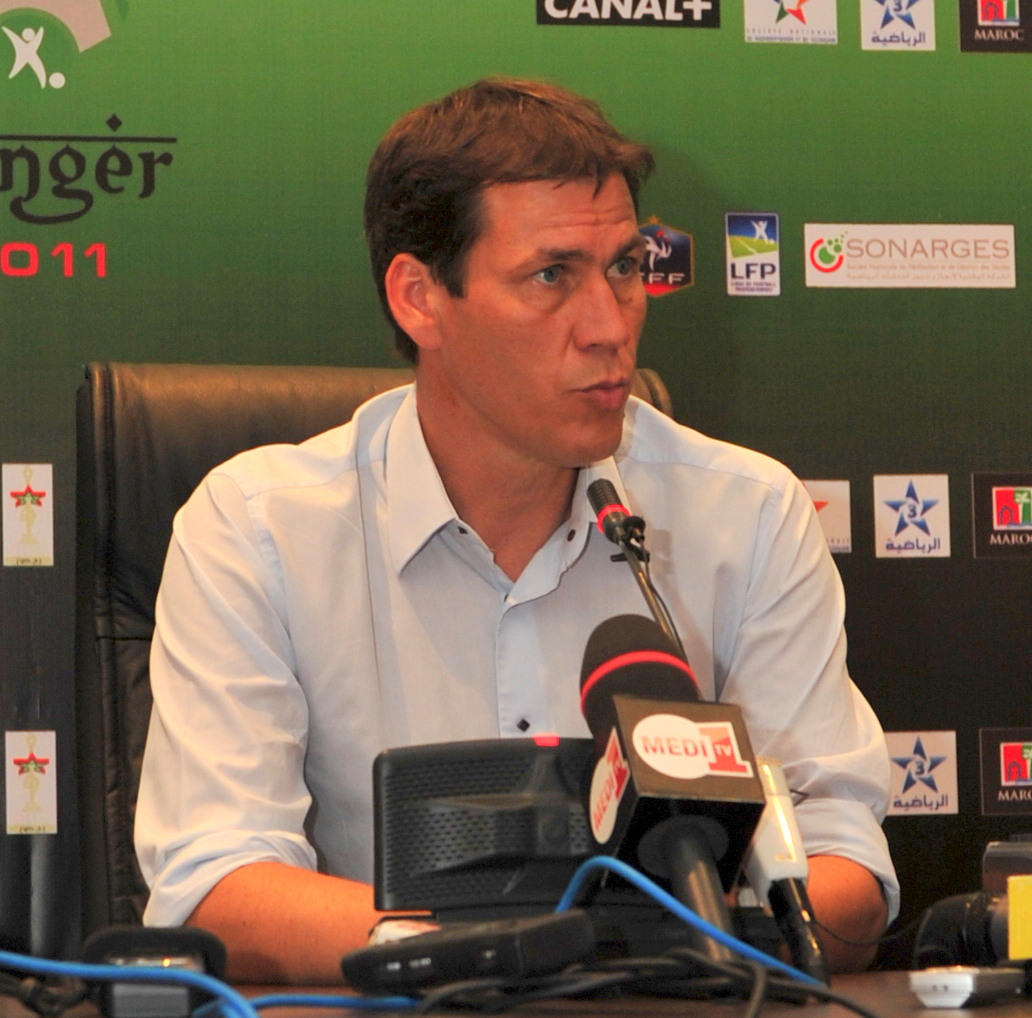
Garcia during a press conference after the Trophée des Champions match defeat against Marseille with Lille in July 2011

On 18 June 2008, Garcia rescinded his contract with the club to join Lille, where he had spent six years as a player in the 1980s. In his first season, they developed a stylish and attacking approach, contrasting with previous coach Claude Puel's cautious and often boring tactics.

Garcia's approach ostensibly enabled players such as Ludovic Obraniak and Michel Bastos to develop, the latter becoming the club's top scorer in the league with 14 goals. Garcia also gave significant playing time to promising youngster Eden Hazard, later of Chelsea and Real Madrid.

On 2 June 2009, the board of directors sacked Garcia, who had just led the club to their best league finish for three years and qualified it for the 2009–10 UEFA Europa League. It was alleged that the sacking was due to differences of opinion between the manager and a member of the board, Xavier Thuilot. The latter himself was sacked from the board later in the month and on 18 June 2009, Michel Seydoux, the club president and major shareholder, offered the manager position again to Garcia, who accepted.

Aimé Jacquet, at the time, expressed his belief that the Nemours-born coach was one of the "brightest prospects" among French football managers. In a country otherwise reputed for the defensive approach approved by most of its coaches, Garcia is seen, together with former Paris Saint-Germain manager Antoine Kombouaré, as part of a small group of managers who advocate attacking football as the best means to achieve results.

In the 2009–10 season, Lille continued to improve in the league, finishing one place above their fifth-place finish of 2008–09. With 72 goals scored, the club had the division's best attack, even bettering champions Marseille. This led French media and pundits to dub the entertaining side "the Barça of the North".

The 2010–11 season was the club's breakthrough. In May, Garcia led les Dogues to triumph in the Coupe de France against Paris Saint-Germain, their first win in the trophy since 1955. The same month, on 21 May, the league and cup double was complete, again after a game against PSG that ended in a 2–2 draw. In the Trophées UNFP du football, Garcia was awarded the prize for best Ligue 1 coach of the 2010–11 season. During the ceremony, he dedicated his trophy to his late father José, even saying a few words in Spanish as a tribute to his father's origins.

=== Roma ===
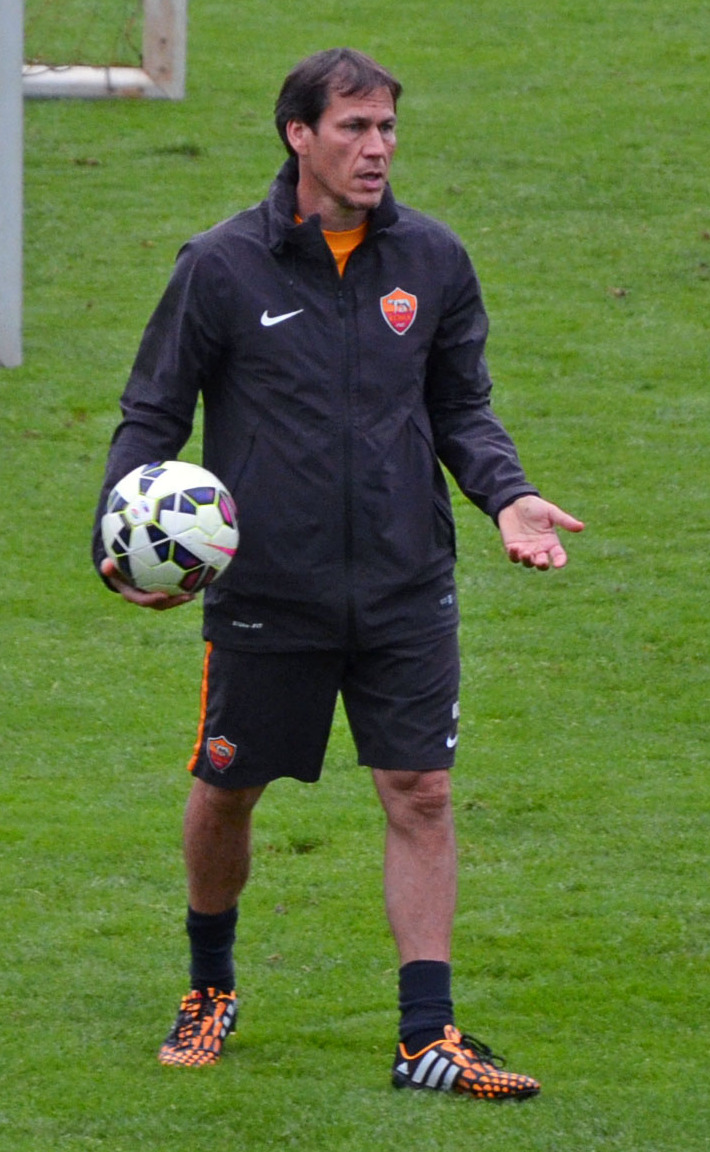
Garcia taking charge of a training session as Roma manager in August 2014

On 12 June 2013, Roma President James Pallotta announced that Garcia had been appointed the new manager of the club, news that was initially received very cautiously by Roma fans.

Roma began the 2013–14 season by winning its first ten Serie A matches. The previous best ever start in the history of the Serie A belonged to Juventus in the 2005–06 season, when the Turin club won its first nine Serie A matches. Roma's perfect start to the 2013–14 Serie A season included a 2–0 derby win over city rivals Lazio, a 3–0 away victory against Internazionale and a 2–0 home win over title rivals Napoli. During this ten-match winning run, Roma scored 24 goals while conceding just one goal, away to Parma. Its Serie A ten-match winning streak came to an end on 3 November 2013 when it was held to a 1–1 draw at Torino. During that match, Roma conceded its first goal in 743 minutes of Serie A football. Roma, however, eventually finished second in the Serie A, a massive 17 points behind champions Juventus. In finishing second, Roma qualified for the following season's UEFA Champions League; its last appearance in the Champions League had been during the 2010–11 season.

Before the start of the 2014–15 season, Garcia asked to bring in young talents and also experienced players for squad depth ahead of the next season. Roma had an impressive summer transfer activity, where they bought young talent Juan Iturbe, Salih Uçan and Antonio Sanabria. Roma also signed Italian defender Davide Astori and veteran players Ashley Cole and Seydou Keita.

Garcia's men began the 2014–15 Serie A campaign with 2–0 win over Fiorentina, with goals from Radja Nainggolan and Gervinho. Roma continued their winning form and won the second fixture in the league 1–0 against Empoli. Garcia then lead Roma in their first Champions League appearance since 2010–11 to an impressive 5–1 victory against CSKA Moscow in their first match of Group E of the group stage. Roma finished third in the group and was hence transferred to the 2014–15 UEFA Europa League knockout phase.

On 5 October 2014, Garcia was sent off by the referee during a Serie A match against Juventus after protesting the referee's decision to award Juve a penalty with a violin gesture. The controversial match ended with Juventus winning 3–2. After the match, Garcia said, "It a pity that here [in Turin] the penalty area is 17 metres. But I'm happy with my team, who showed great personality. There were many incidents today but it was also a little bit of our fault that we lost." Roma ultimately finished the season in second place in the 2014–15 Serie A, 17 points behind Juventus, just like the previous season.

Roma was on top of the Serie A table after matchdays 9 and 10, in late October, of the 2015–16 season. The club had also qualified for the knockout phase of the 2015–16 UEFA Champions League by finishing in second place in their group with a tally of just six points.

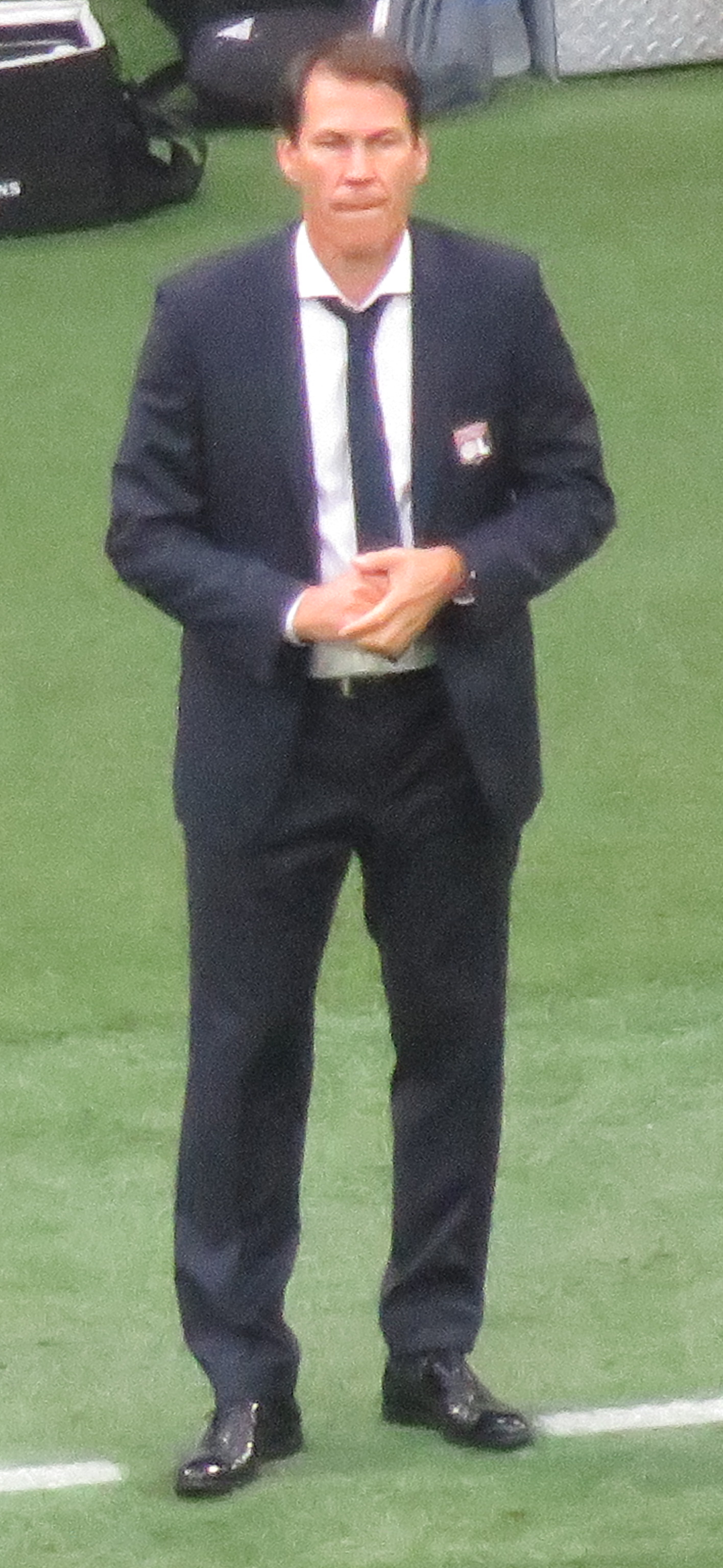
Garcia managing Lyon in a Ligue 1 game against Dijon in October 2019

On 13 January 2016, Garcia and his coaching assistants, Frédéric Bompard and Claude Fichaux, were sacked by Roma after a poor run during which the club managed to win only one out of their last ten matches in all competitions, and only one out of their last seven Serie A matches. Roma had been eliminated on home ground on penalties from the 2015–16 Coppa Italia at the first hurdle on 16 December 2015 by Serie B side Spezia. News of the decision to sack Garcia came via Roma's official website, with club president James Pallotta thanking him for his efforts: "On behalf of myself and everyone at AS Roma, I would like to thank Rudi Garcia for all of his hard work since joining the club. We have all enjoyed some great moments during his time at Roma but we believe that this is the right time for a change." In his two-and-a-half years in the Roma dugout, Garcia recorded 60 wins, 32 draws and 22 defeats in 114 matches. On 20 October 2016, Roma confirmed that the contracts of Garcia and his coaching assistants had been terminated by mutual consent.

=== Marseille ===
On 20 October 2016, on the same day that he was finally released from his Roma contract by mutual consent, Garcia was appointed manager of Marseille on a three-year deal. He succeeded the interim manager Franck Passi. Garcia's appointment was made only three days after Frank McCourt completed the takeover of the club from Margarita Louis-Dreyfus by paying a reported €45 million. On 23 October, Marseille recorded a goalless draw away against Paris Saint-Germain in a Classique match in Ligue 1, Garcia's first competitive match as manager of the club. He left the club on 22 May 2019.

=== Lyon ===
On 14 October 2019, Garcia moved to rivals Lyon to become their new manager, taking over from Sylvinho. During the 2019–20 UEFA Champions League campaign, Garcia guided Lyon from the group stages, where they later beat Juventus in the round of 16. He led them to the semi-finals after they defeated Manchester City, where they then lost to eventual champions Bayern Munich. However, he left Lyon at the end of the 2020–21 season, after finishing fourth in the league table and thus missing out on the UEFA Champions League places.

=== Al Nassr ===
On 29 June 2022, Garcia became the head coach of Saudi club Al Nassr.

On 13 April 2023, Al Nassr announced that Garcia had left the club by mutual agreement.

=== Napoli ===
On 15 June 2023, Garcia was named the new head coach of Napoli, taking over for the resigning Luciano Spalletti. This marked Garcia's return to Serie A after leaving Roma seven years prior. On 14 November 2023, after sixteen games in charge and an 8–4–4 record, Garcia was dismissed by Napoli. They were fourth in the table when he was sacked, two points adrift from third place, and eventually finished the season in tenth.

=== Belgium ===
On 24 January 2025, Garcia was appointed the new head coach of the Belgium national football team, replacing Domenico Tedesco. He signed a contract through the end of the 2026 FIFA World Cup. Garcia's first two matches in charge of Belgium made up their two-legged UEFA Nations League promotion/relegation play-off against Ukraine; his side lost 3–1 in the first leg, though won 3–0 in the second to secure a 4–3 aggregate victory and avoid relegation to League B.

At the 2026 FIFA World Cup, Garcia's Belgium reached the quarter-finals, being eliminated following a 2–1 defeat to eventual champions Spain. Belgium were ultimately the only team to score a goal against Spain throughout the latter's victorious World Cup campaign. After the conclusion of the tournament, the Royal Belgian Football Association announced on 20 July 2026 that Garcia would not be extending his contract with Belgium, which expired on 31 July.

== Managerial style ==
Garcia described his preferred playing style as "a game based on possession, attacking, quick counter-attacking after regaining the ball and, most importantly, having a collective spirit." He values technical and tactical discipline and organisation yet encourages his players to express themselves.

== Media career ==
Garcia has worked for CanalSatellite, first as a reporter for post-match interviews, and then as a studio pundit.

== Personal life ==
Garcia has three daughters, named Carla, Eva and Léna. Since 2014, he has been in a relationship with Italian sports journalist Francesca Brienza, who formerly worked for the AS Roma TV channel during Garcia's time in charge of the Giallorossi. In June 2023, they announced they were expecting their first child together.

After the Paris Charlie Hebdo shooting in January 2015, Garcia gave out symbolic pencils to all journalists at his press conference, saying, "What happened in Paris was an attack on freedom. But things mustn't change; this freedom should last forever."

== Managerial statistics ==
As of 20 July 2026

Managerial record by team and tenure
Team	Nat.	From	To	Record					Ref.
Team	Nat.	From	To	G	W	D	L	Win %	Ref.
Saint-Étienne	(France)	4 January 2001	August 2001	17	5	5	7	29.41	
Dijon	(France)	21 May 2002	8 June 2007	210	90	61	59	42.86	
Le Mans	(France)	8 June 2007	18 June 2008	44	18	11	15	40.91	
Lille	(France)	18 June 2008	3 June 2013	256	127	73	56	49.61	
Roma	(Italy)	12 June 2013	13 January 2016	118	61	35	22	51.69	
Marseille	(France)	20 October 2016	26 May 2019	142	69	34	39	48.59	
Lyon	(France)	14 October 2019	28 June 2021	78	42	18	18	53.85	
Al Nassr	(Saudi Arabia)	28 June 2022	13 April 2023	26	18	5	3	69.23	
Napoli	(Italy)	1 July 2023	14 November 2023	16	8	4	4	50.00	
Belgium	(Belgium)	24 January 2025	20 July 2026	20	12	6	2	60.00	
Career Total				927	450	252	225	48.54	

== Honours ==
=== Manager ===
Lille

- Ligue 1: 2010–11
- Coupe de France: 2010–11

Marseille

- UEFA Europa League runner-up: 2017–18

Lyon

- Coupe de la Ligue runner-up: 2019–20

Individual

- Ligue 1 Manager of the Year: 2010–11
- French Manager of the Year: 2011, 2013, 2014
