= Demba Diagouraga =

French professional footballer (born 1978)

Personal information
- Date of birth: March 12, 1978 (age 48)
- Place of birth: Corbeil-Essonnes, France
- Height: 1.86 m (6 ft 1 in)
- Position: Striker

Team information
- Current team: Red Star

Senior career*
Years	Team	Apps	(Gls)
2000	ES Viry-Châtillon		
2001	Gazélec Ajaccio		
2002–2004	Sainte-Geneviève Sports		
2004–2005	Nancy	6	(0)
2005	Bayonne		
2006–2009	Sainte-Geneviève Sports		
2009–2010	Red Star	12	(0)
- * Club domestic league appearances and goals

Demba Diagouraga (born March 12, 1978) is a French former professional footballer. He played at professional level in Ligue 2 for AS Nancy, and appeared for many years in the lower divisions for clubs including Red Star Saint-Ouen.
