= Margarita Louis-Dreyfus =

Swiss businessperson (born 1962)

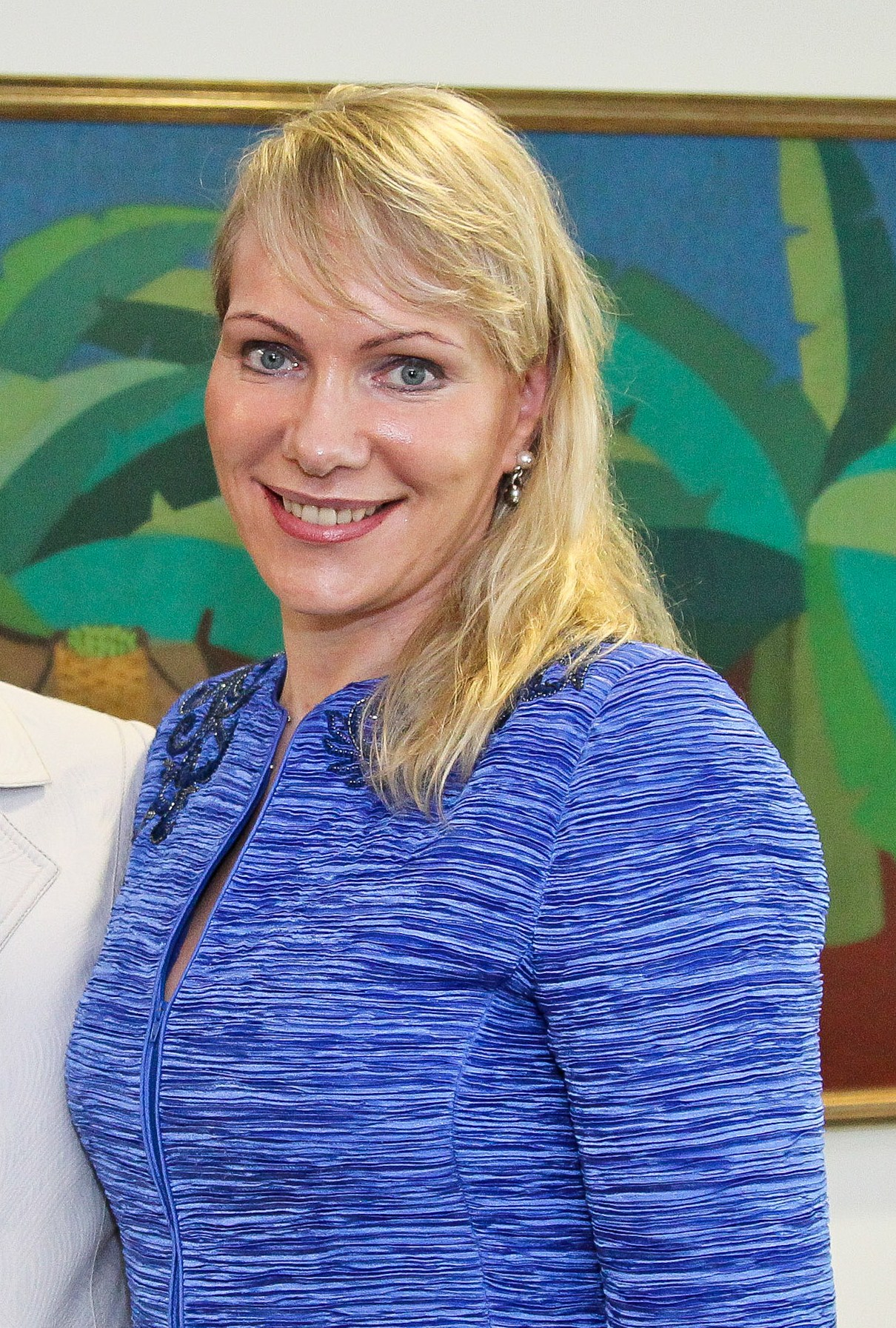
- Louis-Dreyfus in 2011
- Born: Margarita Olegovna Bogdanova; 1 July 1962 (age 64); Leningrad, Russian SFSR, Soviet Union
- Occupation: Businesswoman
- Known for: Chairman, Louis Dreyfus Group
- Spouse: Robert Louis-Dreyfus (m. 1992; died 2009)
- Partner: Philipp Hildebrand (2013–2022)
- Children: 5, including Kyril Louis-Dreyfus

Margarita Louis-Dreyfus (née Bogdanova; born 1 July 1962) is a Russian-born Swiss billionaire businesswoman. She is chairperson of the Louis-Dreyfus Group.

== Early life ==
She was born Margarita Olegovna Bogdanova (Russian: Маргарита Олеговна Богданова) in Leningrad, she was raised by her grandfather, an electrical engineer. She studied law in Moscow and economics in Leningrad.

== Career ==
When her husband, Robert Louis-Dreyfus, died of leukemia on July 4, 2009, she became heiress to the Louis-Dreyfus group and at the same time a majority shareholder of Marseille, a football club her husband had owned since 1996. Her husband had integrated her into the management of the group in 2007, when he learned of the existence of his illness.

On 29 August 2016, Louis-Dreyfus and the Marseille mayor, Jean-Claude Gaudin, stated during a press conference with Frank McCourt that McCourt had agreed in principle to purchase the French Ligue 1 football club, Marseille, owned by Louis-Dreyfus. The purchase deal was completed for a reported price tag of 45 million euros on 17 October 2016.

== Personal life ==
In 1988, on a Zurich to London flight, she met Robert Louis-Dreyfus. They married in 1992 and had three sons, including Kyril who is the chairman and majority shareholder of English Premier League football club, Sunderland. Margarita, who had been working for a circuit-board equipment seller, became a full-time wife and mother. She took over as chairman of the Louis Dreyfus Group in 2009, following her husband's death from leukemia.

She is a Swiss citizen living in Zurich with her three sons, according to Forbes. Her partner was Philipp Hildebrand the former head of the Swiss central bank. She has twin daughters with him who were born in 2016. Margarita is the second cousin once removed (by marriage) of American actress Julia Louis-Dreyfus.

As of 2026, Forbes estimates her net worth at US$5.8 billion.
