= Abbey of Saint-Maurice d'Agaune =

6th-century monastery in Switzerland

Abbey of Saint Maurice
- Abbaye de Saint-Maurice
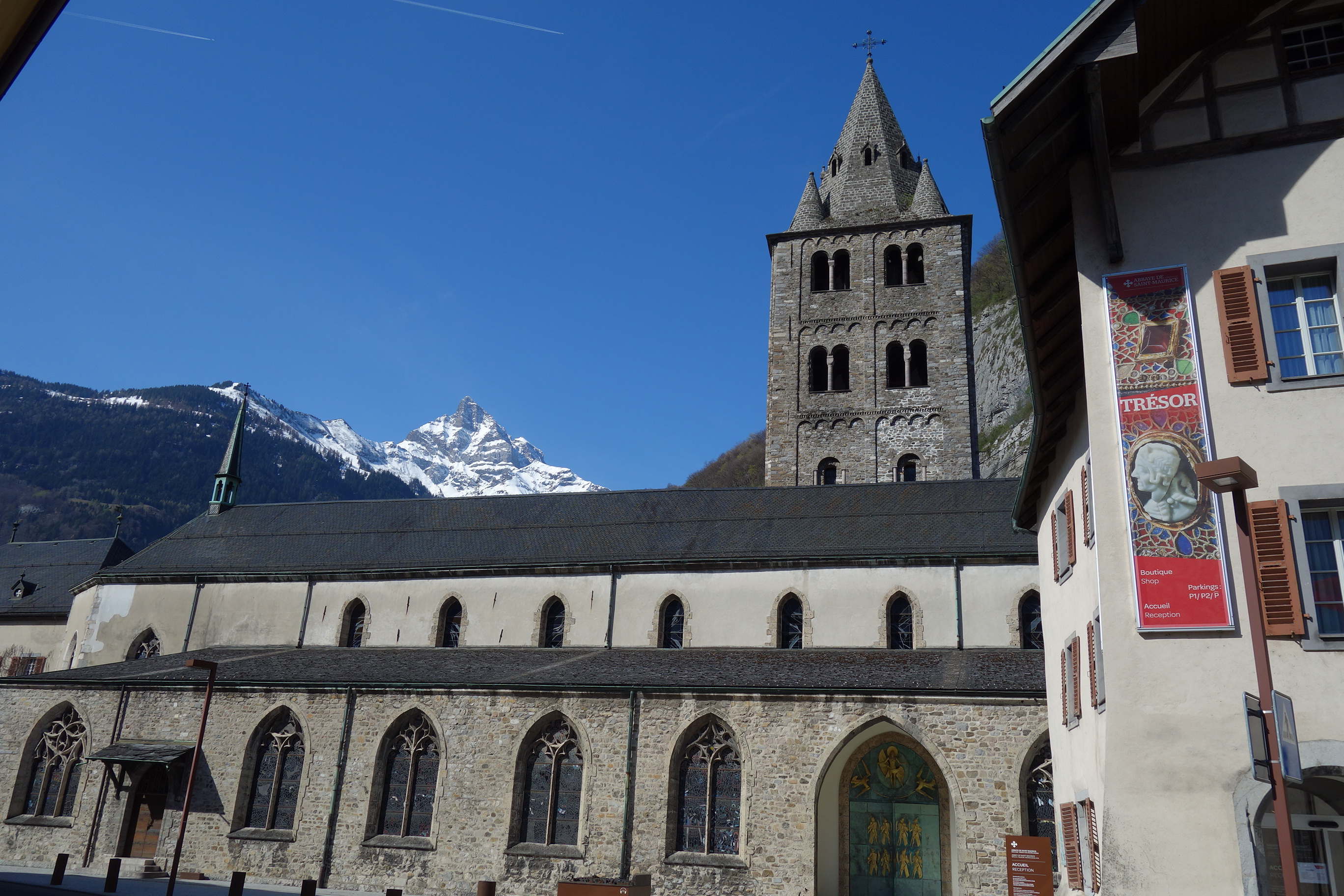

- Location within Switzerland

Monastery information
- Other name: Saint-Maurice-en-Valais
- Order: Canons Regular of St. Augustine
- Established: 515
- Dedication: Saint Maurice

People
- Founder: Sigismund of Burgundy
- Abbot: Most Rev. Alexandre Ineichen, C.R.A.

Architecture
- Functional status: Abbey
- Heritage designation: Cultural Property of National Significance
- Style: Romanesque

Site
- Location: Saint-Maurice, Valais, Switzerland
- Coordinates: 46.219358°N 7.003451°E
- Public access: yes

Swiss Cultural Property of National Significance
- Official name: Abbaye de St-Maurice d'Agaune
- Reference no.: 7114

The Abbey of Saint Maurice, Agaunum (French: Abbaye de Saint-Maurice d'Agaune or Saint-Maurice-en-Valais) is a Swiss monastery of canons regular in Saint-Maurice, Canton of Valais, which dates from the 6th century. It is situated against a cliff in a section of the road between Geneva and the Simplon Pass (to northern Italy). The abbey itself is a territorial abbacy and not part of any diocese. It is best known for its connection to the martyrdom of the Theban Legion, its original practice of perpetual psalmody, and a collection of art and antiquity.

The abbey is a Swiss heritage site of national significance.

== History ==
The abbey of St. Maurice is built on the ruins of a Roman shrine of the 1st century B.C. dedicated to the god Mercury in the Roman staging-post of Agaunum. The Latin name Acaunum, which became Agaune in French, came from a Gaulish term meaning "pointed rock". The site housed a Roman customs post, where a tax was levied on all the goods that crossed this cluse at the entrance to the Rhone Valley. According to Eucherius, Bishop of Lyon, Theodore of Octodurum constructed a small shrine around 370 to commemorate the martyrdom of St. Maurice and the Theban Legion, which was said to have occurred in the area where the abbey is located. Theodorus then gathered the local hermits in a common life, thus beginning the Community of Saint-Maurice.

In 515, the Basilica of St. Maurice of Agaunum became the church of a monastery under the patronage of King Sigismund of Burgundy, the first ruler in his dynasty to convert from Arian Christianity to Trinitarian Christianity.

The abbey became known for a form of perpetual psalmody known as laus perennis that was practised there beginning in 522 or 523. The chants were sung day and night, by several choirs in rotation without ceasing. The practice continued there until the 9th century, when the monks were replaced by a community of canons. Amatus of Grenoble joined the abbey around 581, later retiring to a hermitage.

The abbey had some of the richest and best preserved treasures in Western Europe, such as the Ewer of Saint-Maurice d'Agaune.

In the mid-9th century, Hucbert, brother-in-law of the king Lothair II, seized the abbey. In 864 he was killed in a battle at the Orbe river and was replaced by the victor, count Conrad of Auxerre, who became the commendatory abbot of the abbey, and Lord of the Transjuran Burgundy.

Boso, later King of Provence, (850-887) received the abbey around 870 from his brother-in-law, Charles the Bald. Conrad's son, Rudolph I of Burgundy, who had inherited the commendatory abbacy from him, became king of Upper Burgundy in 888, and was crowned in a ceremony at the abbey itself, which he then made the royal residence. His descendants continued to rule as Kings of Burgundy, in a line running from Rudolf I to Rudolf III. They directed the abbey until around the year 1000. The monastery remained the property of the Kingdom of Burgundy until 1033, when, through the defeat in battle of Eudes, a nephew of Rudolf III, it passed to the control of the House of Savoy. Amadeus III, Count of Savoy, became the commendatory abbot of the monastery in 1103 and worked to revive religious observance at the abbey by installing there, in 1128, the community of canons regular, who still live there under the Rule of St. Augustine, in place of the secular canons.

Throughout the history of the abbey, its strategic mountain pass location and independent patronage has subjected it to the whims of war. The abbey was often forced to pay ransom or house troops. In 1840, Pope Gregory XVI conferred the title of the See of Bethlehem in perpetuity on the abbey.

In 2019, to diversify its revenues, the abbey launched its beer production. The brewery, fully owned by the abbey, produces three beers. The yeast used to produce them was taken from a parchment dating from 1319.

Today the abbey consists of some 40 canons, with 2 lay brothers. The Most Rev. Abbot Joseph Roduit, C.R.A., who was elected in 1999, resigned with the permission of Pope Francis on Wednesday, 18 March 2015, replaced by Abbot Jean Scarcella on 1 August 2015 . The canonical community serves both the spiritual needs of the territory of the Territorial abbey as well as five parishes in the Diocese of Sion. The canons also operate a highly ranked secondary school.

=== Cases of sexual abuse ===
According to research by the Swiss French-language broadcaster RTS, allegations of sexual abuse had been made against a total of nine Augustinian canons of the Abbey of Saint-Maurice, five of whom were still alive. In September 2023, the University of Zurich published research on sexual abuse in the Catholic Church in Switzerland, based on an independent research team's examination of church archives.

== Architecture ==
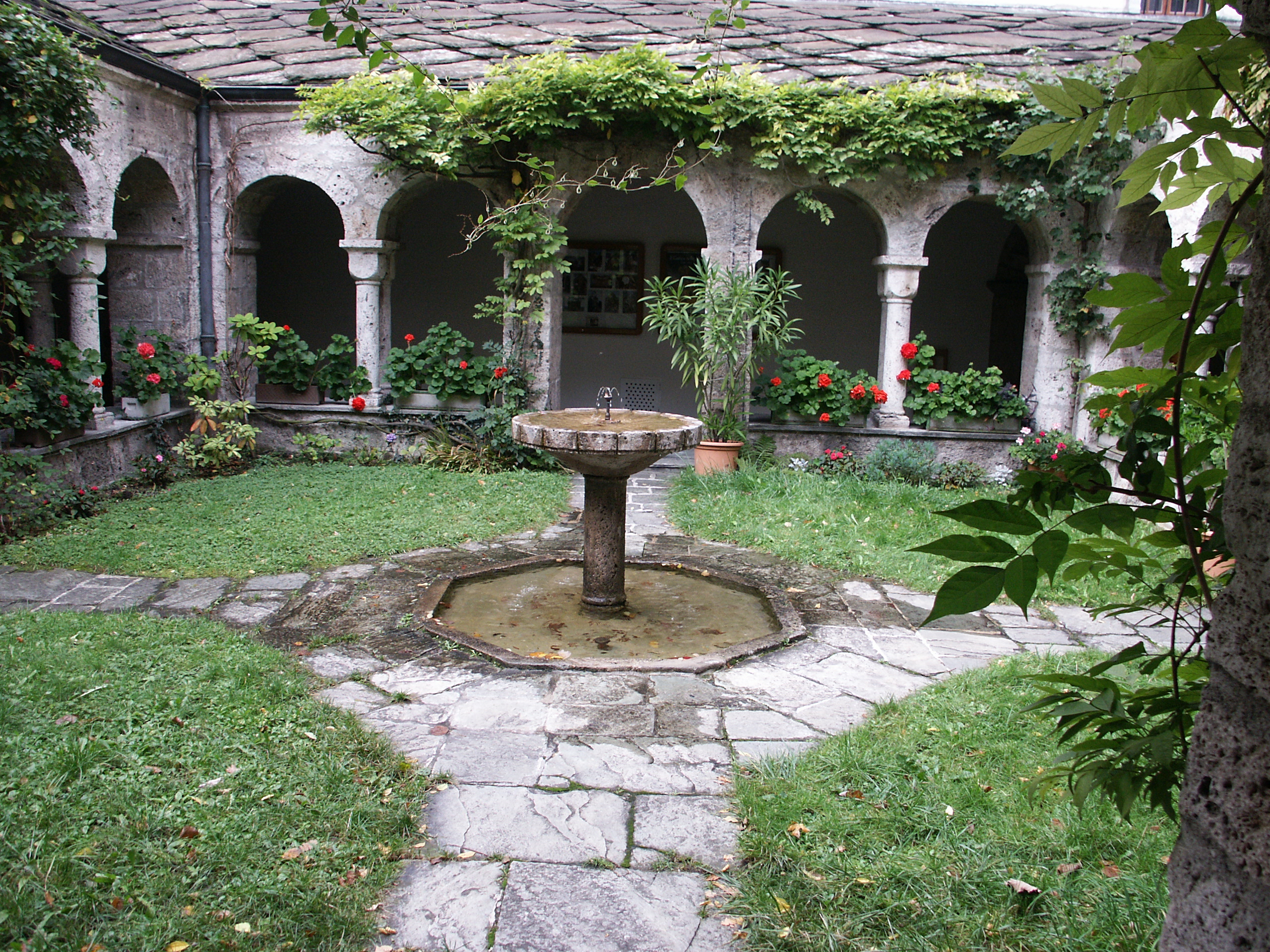
View of the cloister.

The abbey has been built and rebuilt over a period of at least 15 centuries. Excavations on the site have revealed a baptistry dating to the 4th and 5th centuries, a series of four main Carolingian era churches built over one another dating from the 5th to the 11th century, and crypts built between the 4th and 8th century.

The current church was first built in the 17th century while the tower dates to the 11th century. Preceding Clermont-Ferrand Cathedral in 946, Chartres Cathedral ca. 1020 and Rouen Cathedral ca. 1030, the abbey was an early example of an ambulatory plan with radiating chapels. The Romanesque tower was reconstructed in 1945 to repair damage caused by a massive falling rock. The newly installed carillon is the largest built to date in Switzerland.

== School ==
The Lycée-collège de l'Abbaye de Saint-Maurice is a maturité gymnasiale, a gymnasium which offers the matura as the school-leaving qualification. The canons have educated students at the abbey since its foundation but the school in its modern form was opened in 1806. Notable alumni include controversial former FIFA president Sepp Blatter, former Presidents of Switzerland Alphons Egli and Pascal Couchepin and former chairman of the Swiss National Bank Jean-Pierre Roth.

== See also ==
- List of Carolingian monasteries
- Carolingian architecture
- Graines Castle

== Sources ==
- Hauff, Andrea (2018). "Carolingian Traditions and New Beginnings: The Coronation of Rudolph I of Upper Burgundy". Bulletin du centre d'études médiévales d'Auxerre. 22 (1): 1–13. Archived from the original on 2023-11-18.
- Heidecker, Karl (2010). The Divorce of Lothar II: Christian Marriage and Political Power in the Carolingian World. Ithaca and London: Cornell University Press. ISBN 978-0-8014-3929-2.
- Riché, Pierre (1993). The Carolingians: A Family Who Forged Europe. Philadelphia: University of Pennsylvania Press. ISBN 0-8122-1342-4.
