= Motor-Columbus =

Swiss electricity finance and engineering company

- Company type: Joint-stock company
- Industry: Electricity finance and engineering
- Founded: 1923 (merger); Motor AG founded 1895
- Fate: Renamed Atel Holding SA (2007)
- Headquarters: Baden, Switzerland
- Products: Financing, engineering, and operation of electricity undertakings

Motor-Columbus was a Swiss electricity finance and engineering company. It was formed in 1923 from the merger of Motor AG für angewandte Elektrizität and Columbus AG für elektrische Unternehmungen, and was renamed Atel Holding SA in 2007.

== History ==
Motor-Columbus arose from the 1923 merger of Motor AG für angewandte Elektrizität and Columbus AG für elektrische Unternehmungen (founded in 1913), the latter operating mainly in South America. Motor AG had been founded in 1895 to finance the electrical installations of Brown, Boveri & Cie, chiefly in Switzerland and northern Italy. In 1908 the company linked the run-of-river power station at Beznau with the Löntsch storage reservoir, thereby creating the first large electricity supply network in Switzerland, which it sold in 1914 to the newly established Nordostschweizerische Kraftwerke (NOK).

In addition to developing its hydroelectric plants, Motor-Columbus planned from 1966 to build a nuclear power station at Kaiseraugst, a project it was forced to abandon for political reasons in 1988. From 1974 the company tried, without success, to diversify its traditional energy and engineering activities into construction (the general contractor Mobag) and telecommunications (TeleColumbus). By the 1990s its holdings were practically limited to its majority stake in Atel (Aare-Tessin AG für Elektrizität).

In 2007, in connection with the planned union of Energie Ouest Suisse and Atel, Motor-Columbus changed its name to Atel Holding SA. This was more than a renaming: it marked a shift in the company's role, from the historic Motor-Columbus finance and engineering holding to a holding for the Atel energy group. Atel Holding existed only briefly before its operations passed in 2009 to the newly formed Alpiq.

== Bibliography ==
- E. Haag, Motor-Columbus, 1895–1995, 1995
