= Fritz Leutwiler =

Swiss economist (1924–1997)

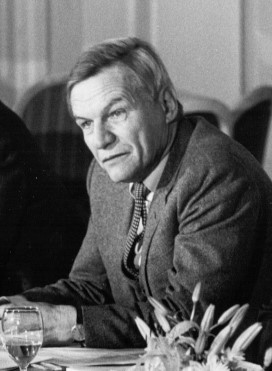
- Fritz Leutwiler in 1986
- Born: 30 July 1924; Baden AG, Switzerland
- Died: 27 May 1997 (aged 72); Zumikon
- Occupation: Economist
- Known for: leading the Swiss National Bank; president of the Bank for International Settlements
- Parents: Friedrich Leutwiler (father); Fanny Marie Burgherr (mother)

Fritz Leutwiler (30 July 1924–27 May 1997) was a Swiss economist. After his studies at the University of Zurich (PhD in 1948), he worked at the Schweizerischer Bankverein, the predecessor of today's UBS, in London.

In 1952, he was hired by the Swiss National Bank as a scientific collaborator. He was made member of their directorial board in 1959. From 1974 until 1984, he presided the national bank. Later, from 1982 until 1984, he was also president of the Bank for International Settlements.

In his later career, he led the electrical engineering company Brown, Boveri & Cie as the president of its governing board (1985-1992), managing its later fusion with the Swedish ASEA company. Other enterprises of which he was a member of the governing board were:

- Ciba-Geigy
- Nestlé
- Precious Woods, a company specializing in tropical wood.

He married Andrée Marguerite Cottier, daughter of a previous Motor-Columbus CEO. Motor-Columbus was an engineering and financing company active in the area of hydro and nuclear power, founded on the initiative of Brown Boveri, which made the hardware for such power plants.

== Sources ==
- Scherer, Sarah Brian (2008-11-25). "Fritz Leutwiler" (in German). Historical Dictionary of Switzerland.
