= Atel =

Atel may refer to:

- Atel people, an ethnic group in Laos, speaking Maleng language (Atel dialect)
- Ațel, a commune in Romania
- ATel, The Astronomer's Telegram, an astronomical internet service
- Atel (slang), a Bengali pejorative term

== See also ==
- Attel
- Attell
