= Thomas Jordan (economist) =

Swiss economist and central banker (born 1963)

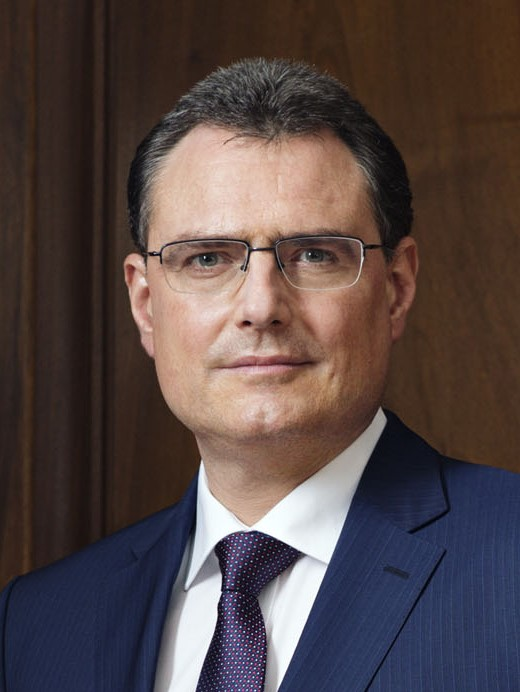
- Jordan in 2015
- Born: Thomas Jordan; 28 January 1963 (age 63); Biel, Switzerland
- Education: Gymnasium Alpenstrasse (High school); University of Bern (BA); Harvard University (MBA)
- Occupations: Economist; Banker
- Board member of: Former chairman of Swiss National Bank; Former chairman of Central Bank Counterfeit Deterrence Group; Former member of Bank for International Settlements; Zurich Insurance (2025– ); Nestlé (2026– )

Thomas Jakob Ulrich Jordan (Swiss Standard German pronunciation: [ˈtoːmas ˈjaːkɔb ˈʊlrɪç ˈjɔrdan]; born 28 January 1963) is a Swiss economist and central banker. He is the former chairman of the governing board of the Swiss National Bank, former chairman of the Central Bank Counterfeit Deterrence Group, a former member of the board of directors of the Bank for International Settlements, and a former member of the steering committee of the Financial Stability Board.

Jordan was born on 28 January 1963 in the city of Biel/Bienne. He studied economics and business studies at the University of Bern, completing his degree in 1989 and his doctorate in 1993. He wrote a post-doctoral thesis on the subject of European Monetary Union and predicted the sovereign debt crisis and also the bank failures that eventually transpired during three years he spent as a researcher at Harvard University in the United States. He was appointed a lecturer at the University of Bern in 1998 and an honorary professor in 2003. Jordan joined the Swiss National Bank as an economic advisor in 1997 and progressed through various roles. He joined the governing board as an alternate member in 2004 and became a full member in 2007. He was appointed chairman on 18 April 2012, following the resignation of Philipp Hildebrand from that role.

On 1 March 2024, Jordan announced his resignation in September 2024 as chairman of the governing board of the Swiss National Bank. His successor Martin Schlegel assumed the position on 1 October 2024.

After leaving the Swiss National Bank, Jordan joined Zurich Insurance Group's board in 2025 and was elected to Nestlé's board of directors on 16 April 2026.

Jordan is married and has two sons.
