= Ewer of Saint-Maurice d'Agaune =

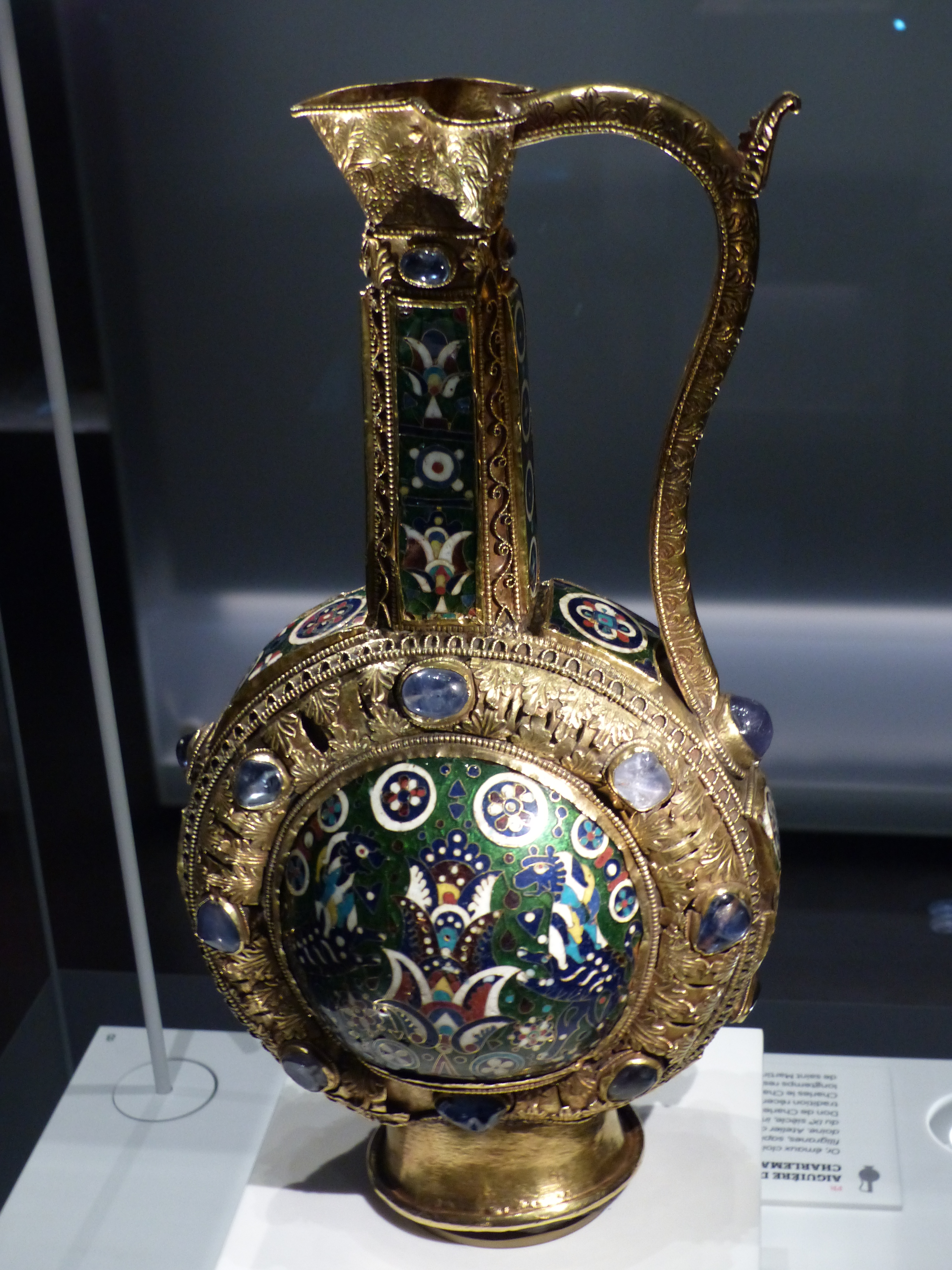
The ewer

The Ewer of Saint-Maurice d'Agaune is a gold ewer, probably of Byzantine origin, in the treasury of the Swiss monastery of Saint-Maurice d'Agaune. There has been much scholarly discussion of its place and date of creation, or whether the object we have represents different stages of work. The enameled ewer is one of the many treasures in the Saint-Maurice d'Agaune monastery. The origins of the piece were said to have been seventh century, but more recently, in 2008, it is argued to have been from the fifth or early sixth century due to the application of the cloisonné enamel.

== Description ==
The ewer is 30.3 cm high with a long neck and two rounded discs forming the body. The motifs centralized on the body of the ewer are, on one disk, two eagle-headed griffins, and on the other disk, two lions encompassing a lotus tree. The tall neck also has two enamel rectangular pieces with detailed design work.

The intricate cloisonné work utilizes irregular shaped sapphires, and other deep enamel of emerald green, pearl white, and dark blue. The colored gemstones were understood primarily as symbolic representations of the cycle of the seasons in the Byzantine period - green for spring, blue for winter, red for summer, and white for autumn, which is also attributed to a similar vase found at Saint-Maurice d'Agaune.

== Origin ==
The date and origination of the ewer has been highly debated among art historians and students. This debate includes belief that it originated from Islamic, Carolingian, or Sasanian origins. Although some of the imagery of the ewer could allude to a multitude of origins, the griffin disk enamel work tie this piece to the Byzantine period.

Previous to 2008, it was presumed to have been a piece from the seventh century, but in the late fifth century stylistic changes moved from plain foil beneath the gemstone inlay to a decorative style that remained popular from the late fifth century and after. Instead of utilizing the popular decorative foil used predominately after the late fifth century, it has the plain foil style relevant to earlier fifth century work.
