= Central Bank Counterfeit Deterrence Group =

The mission of the Central Bank Counterfeit Deterrence Group (CBCDG), originally designated as Special Study Group 2 or SSG-2 of the G10, is to investigate emerging threats to the security of banknotes and to propose solutions for implementation by issuing authorities. The CBCDG is a working group of 35 central banks and note printing authorities, and is chaired by Thomas Jordan, the chairman of the Swiss National Bank.

The CBCDG maintains a website designed to advise the public about national laws related to the reproduction of banknotes.

== History ==
The CBCDG was established by the G10 central banks in 2000, in order to counter the threat of computer-based banknote counterfeiting.

In 2004, CBCDG announced the development of a "Counterfeit Deterrence System" (CDS) incorporating a technical means for the detection of banknotes. This system was reportedly developed by the U.S.-based watermark technology company Digimarc.

Adobe Systems was subsequently the subject of controversy in when it was revealed that the firm had voluntarily adopted the CDS in Adobe Photoshop, preventing Photoshop from processing some images of currency. Jasc (publisher of Paint Shop Pro) and Adobe stated that they had implemented CDS; they reportedly did not receive technical details of the CDS algorithm (in other words, it was provided to them as a black box). Some artists and professional graphic designers suggested that the CDS would make it more difficult for them to use Photoshop to produce images that used currency in lawful ways. Steven J. Murdoch has begun a technical investigation of how the CDS works.

As of 2022, Digimarc was still partnered with the CBCDG; the company announced that it had renewed an existing agreement with the group, which would now last through the end of 2029.

== Member banks ==
The CBCDG consists of central banks in 34 separate countries, as well as the European Central Bank. The countries participating in the CBCDG are:

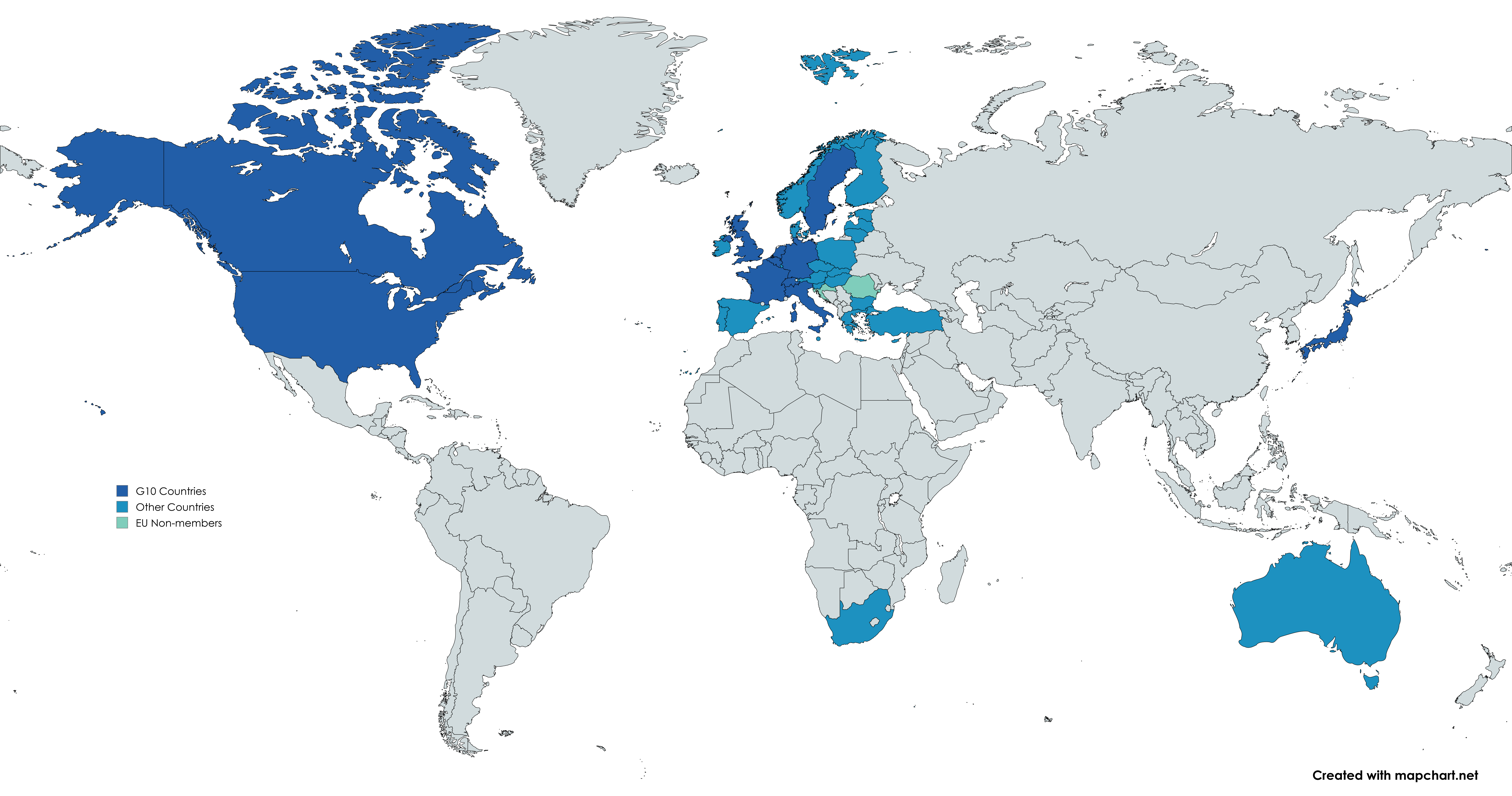
Map of countries with central banks taking part in the CBCDG

- The G10 members:
  - Belgium
  - Canada
  - France
  - Germany
  - Italy
  - Japan
  - Netherlands
  - Sweden
  - Switzerland
  - United Kingdom
  - United States
- Australia
- Austria
- Bulgaria
- Cyprus
- Czech Republic
- Denmark
- Estonia
- Finland
- Greece
- Hungary
- Ireland
- Latvia
- Lithuania
- Luxembourg
- Malta
- Norway
- Poland
- Portugal
- Slovakia
- Slovenia
- South Africa
- Spain
- Turkey

== See also ==
- EURion constellation – Anti-counterfeiting marking used on various banknotes
