= Martin Schlegel =

Swiss economist (born 1976)

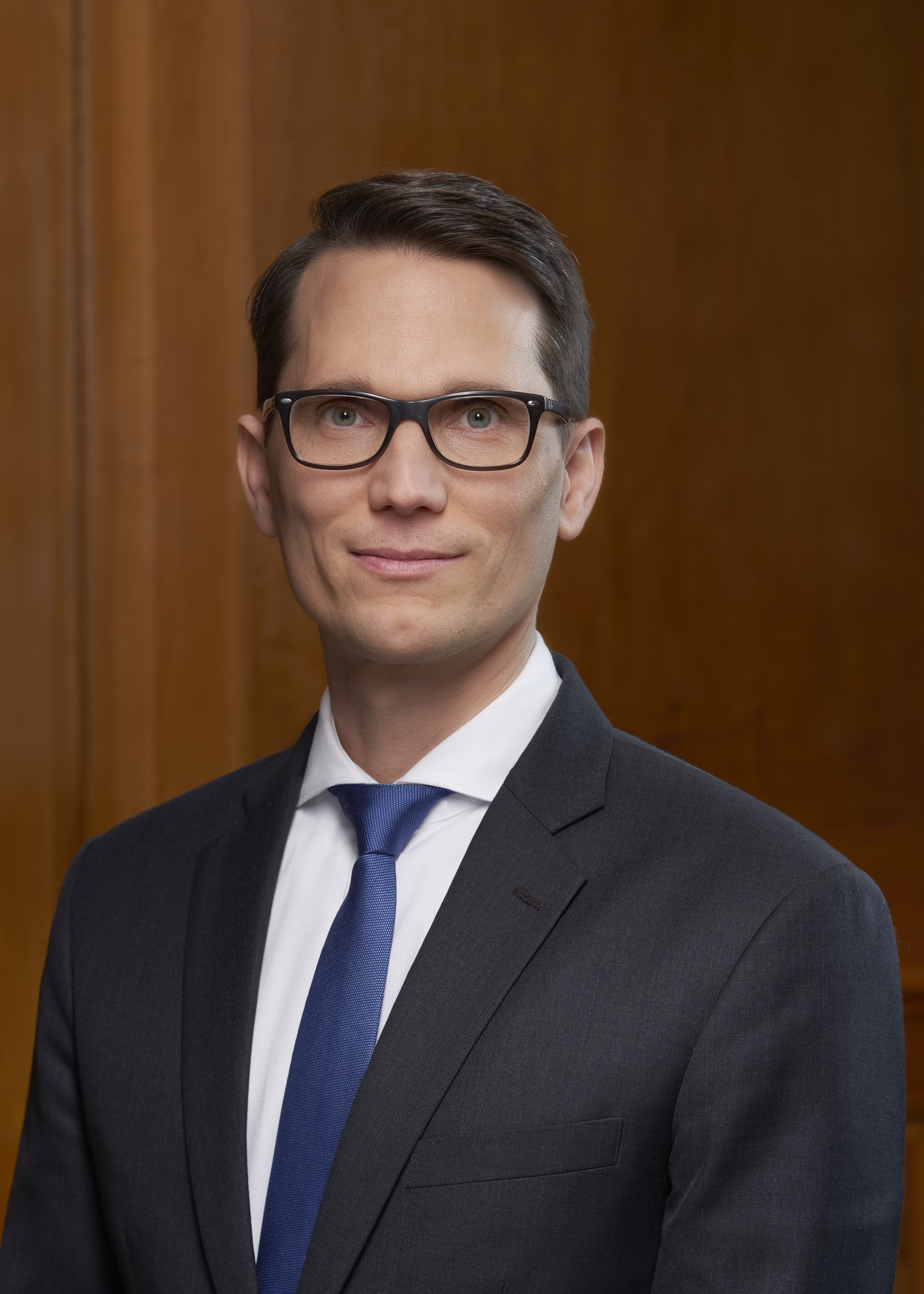
- Schlegel in 2020
- Born: Martin Reto Schlegel; 20 August 1976 (age 49)
- Education: University of Zurich (master's degree); University of Basel (PhD)
- Title: Chairman of the Governing Board of the Swiss National Bank
- Term: 2024–present
- Predecessor: Thomas Jordan
- Board member of: the KOF Swiss Economic Institute at the ETH Zurich; Schweizerische Gesellschaft für Konjunkturforschung (SGK)
- Spouse: Nicole Brändle
- Children: 3

Martin Schlegel (born 20. August 1976) is a Swiss economist and Chairman of the Governing Board of the Swiss National Bank (SNB).

== Education and business career ==
Martin Schlegel studied economics at the University of Zurich and completed his studies in 2003 with a master's degree. Subsequently, he joined the Research Unit at the SNB followed by positions in the SNB's Financial Market Analysis and Money Market units. While working, he obtained a doctorate in economics from the University of Basel in 2009. Since 2010, he has been an adjunct professor at the University of Basel. In the years 2015 and 2016 Schlegel also worked as an expert for the International Monetary Fund.

After a proposal from the SNB's Bank Council, Schlegel was appointed as an Alternate member of the SNB's Governing Board by the Swiss Federal Council in June 2018. In May 2022, the Federal Council appointed Schlegel as the Vice-Chairman of the Governing Board of the Swiss National Bank. This also made him Head of Department II of the SNB. Later that year he was a speaker at the Forum for Financial Market Stability held by the Financial Market Authority Liechtenstein.

In an interview in October 2023 Schlegel, talking about the Acquisition of Credit Suisse by UBS, said: "We don't have a mandate to rescue a bank."

After the announcement of Thomas Jordans resignation in March 2024, Schlegel was seen as the favourite for his position as Chairman of the SNB. On 26 June 2024 the Federal Council elected Schlegel as the new Chairman following the recommendation of the Governing Board. He assumed the position on 1 October 2024.

== Personal life ==
Schlegel is married to Nicole Brändle, the former director of HotellerieSuisse, who stepped down in June 2025 to avoid giving the impression of a conflict of interest with Schlegels promotion to director. They have 3 children together.

== Publications ==
- Schlegel, Martin (2009). Implementation of Monetary Policy and the Money Market (Dr. rer. pol thesis). University of Basel.
- Kraenzlin, Sébastien; Schlegel, Martin (1 March 2012). "Bidding behavior in the SNB's repo auctions". Journal of International Money and Finance. 31 (2): 170–188. doi:10.1016/j.jimonfin.2011.10.001. S2CID 18708525.
- Kraenzlin, Sébastien; Schlegel, Martin (27 December 2012). "Demand for reserves and the central bank's management of interest rates". Swiss Journal of Economics and Statistics. 148 (4): 532–555. doi:10.1007/BF03399377. hdl:10419/186011. ISSN 2235-6282. S2CID 53970950.
- Jäggi, Adrian; Schlegel, Martin; Zanetti, Attilio (23 May 2019). "Macroeconomic surprises, market environment, and safe-haven currencies". Swiss Journal of Economics and Statistics. 155 (1). doi:10.1186/s41937-019-0031-9. hdl:10419/259729. ISSN 2235-6282. S2CID 257086235.
