= Alexandre Ineichen =

Swiss priest (1967–present)

Alexandre Ineichen C.R.S.A.
- Abbot of Saint-Maurice d'Agaune
- Church: Catholic Church
- See: Abbey of Saint-Maurice d'Agaune
- Installed: 31 October 2025
- Predecessor: Jean Scarcella

Orders
- Ordination: 21 May 1994 by Henri Salina

Personal details
- Born: 24 October 1967 (age 59) Bern, Switzerland
- Motto: Insta Opportune Importune
- Coat of arms: Alexandre Ineichen's coat of arms

Alexandre Ineichen CRA (born 24 October 1967) is a Roman Catholic priest and monk, currently serving as Abbot of the Abbey of Saint-Maurice d'Agaune in Switzerland.

== Life ==
Alexandre Ineichen was born in Bern on 24 October 1967, and was raised in the Chablais. Following his education at the high school of the Abbey of Saint-Maurice, he earned a degree in theology from the Université de Fribourg, where he also pursued studies in mathematics. Additionally, he received a diploma in school mediation from Vallese and a Certificate of Advanced Studies in training organization management.

He made his solemn vows in 1989 and was ordained as a priest on 21 May 1994.

Within the abbey community, he has served in several capacities, including member of the Abbey Council (2006–2024), delegate ad Omnia (2023–2025), section secretary (2011–2018), and deputy prior (since 2025).

In the realm of academia, he has taught mathematics, physics, and religion at the Abbey College, subsequently holding the positions of supervisor (1996–2003), pro-rector (2003–2007), and rector (since 2007).

In 2025, Pope Leo XIV appointed Ineichen as ordinary abbot of the Territorial Abbey of Saint-Maurice, confirming his election by his brother monks. Ineichen is the 96th abbot to lead Saint-Maurice, the oldest monastery in Switzerland. Abbot Ineichen was elected to improve the abbey's handling of sexual abuse cases, which had hurt the community in recent years.
