= Philipp Hildebrand =

Swiss banker (born 1963)

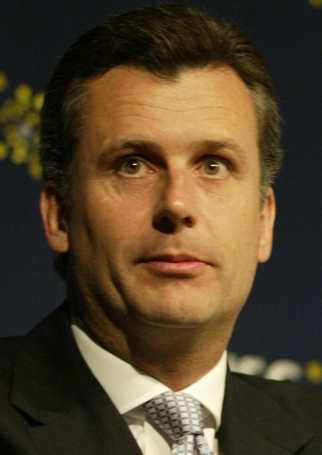
- Hildebrand in 2005
- Born: Philipp Michael Hildebrand; 19 July 1963 (age 63); Bern, Switzerland
- Education: University of Toronto; Lincoln College, Oxford; Graduate Institute of International Studies
- Occupation: Banker
- Spouses: Kashya Mahmood (div. 2013); Kimberley Julius (m. 2024)
- Partner: Margarita Louis-Dreyfus (2013–2022)
- Children: 3

Philipp Michael Hildebrand (born 19 July 1963) is a Swiss banker who has been a vice chairman of BlackRock since 2012.

Before joining BlackRock in 2012, Hildebrand served as Chairman of the Governing Board of the Swiss National Bank (SNB). He was the Governor of the International Monetary Fund (IMF), Director of the Bank for International Settlements (BIS) and member of the Financial Stability Board (FSB), when he was appointed as Vice Chairman in November 2011 by leaders of the G20.

== Early life and education ==
Hildebrand attended the University of Toronto, Oxford University's Lincoln College, and the Graduate Institute of International Studies in Geneva. He was part of a group of students that helped out during the Annual Meetings of the World Economic Forum in Davos, Switzerland. There, he met leading international government officials and bankers.

== Career ==
=== Private sector ===
In 1994, Hildebrand began his professional career at WEF. He subsequently worked at Moore Capital Management, a hedge fund in New York and London, where he met his first wife. He then worked as head of hedge funds for Union Bancaire Privée in Geneva and Vontobel in Zurich.

=== SNB ===
Hildebrand was said to be the "youngest ever policy maker" when he joined the SNB in 2003.

Prior to his resignation from the SNB, Hildebrand was a member of the board of directors of the Bank for International Settlements in Basel, as well as vice-chairman of the Financial Stability Board. From 2008, he was a member of the Group of Thirty.

==== Controversy around the 2009–2010 exchange rate interventions ====
Hildebrand was attacked after losses arising from SNB's exchange rate interventions between March 2009 and June 2010. In this period, the SNB accumulated foreign currency reserves worth over 200 billion Swiss francs (Codes: CHF, SFr). As the Swiss franc has appreciated, the interventions caused losses on SNB foreign currency positions equivalent to 26.5 billion Swiss francs in 2010 and 11.7 billion Swiss francs in the first six months of 2011. The SNB has defended these interventions as they made “sense at the zero lower bound when the traditional monetary policy instrument is exhausted”. Some international press and financial market analysts considered the interventions a “costly failure”.

The Swiss People's Party and the magazine Die Weltwoche were critics of Hildebrand, demanding his resignation. Prominent figures of other parties supported Hildebrand and emphasized the political independence of the SNB. In an article titled “With Unsteady Hand”, Switzerland's major business magazine Bilanz criticized Hildebrand's leadership of SNB, citing his limited experience and saying that his actions in large parts seem to be the result of his eagerness to appeal to the public.

==== Pegging of the Swiss Franc to the Euro since 6 September 2011 ====
Hildebrand is considered a driving force behind the pegging of the Swiss Franc to the Euro announced on 6 September 2011. The central bank commits to undertake transactions to cap the value of the franc against the euro at a maximum of 1.20. In early August, the euro fell to near parity, at 1.00749, against the franc. After initial cautious reactions by analysts, the decision of the Swiss National Bank to aim to keep the Swiss Franc: Euro rate above 1.20 is considered to have been a success.

==== 2011 personal foreign exchange trading and resignation ====
In August 2011, Hildebrand's wife Kashya made a CHF 60,000 ($64,400) profit on a currency transaction. At the time, Philipp Hildebrand reported the transaction to the SNB and moved to prevent future such trades with Bank Sarasin. His wife asserted her independent finance and banking experience as the basis for the "almost ridiculously cheap" trade. In January 2012, Hildebrand denied accusations of insider trading in relation to the transaction, resisted calls for his resignation and called the coverage "a smear campaign".

He said that his political foes endangered the secrecy laws and "the interests of Switzerland" with the accusations. "I made mistakes" in not canceling the trade, which profited from the SNB's decision to intervene in the currency markets two days later "but I always acted in line with the rules", he said.

The profit in the later report was said to be CHF 75,000. A whistleblower alleged to have released the information about the trade has been fired and faces criminal investigations under Swiss banking secrecy laws. Kashya, who runs an art gallery in Zurich and previously traded currencies, made two other transactions – the three totaled $2 million principal amount – but the other two "didn’t break central bank rules because they were more than six months apart". Philipp "told reporters he had donated all profits made from ... currency deals to a Swiss charitable organization [and] ... said the Swiss central bank’s rules already meet European standards. Germany’s ... Handelsblatt newspaper questioned this. 'If Hildebrand had been the guardian of the euro, and not the franc, then the European Central Bank’s rules would have given [him] no other option but to resign', the paper wrote." The whistleblower was reported to have given the trade information to Christoph Blocher, vice president of the SVP, and Blocher was one of the lead voices calling for Hildebrand's resignation after the disclosure. Die Zeit in a strongly worded commentary downplayed any wrongdoing on Hildebrand's part, stressing the evidence was "stolen" and the resignation came only "to maintain credibility" of SNB.

Hildebrand announced his resignation on 9 January 2012 stating that "Credibility is a central banker's most valuable asset", and that the accusations came "during a time when total focus is needed on the duties." He also resigned his posts at the Bank for International Settlements and the International Monetary Fund. He issued a statement that included copies of E-Mails between his wife, himself, and his banker, showing that he was aware of the controversial trade shortly after the order had been given by his wife, but failed to request that it be immediately cancelled.

Hildebrand was succeeded by vice chairman and interim SNB head Thomas Jordan.

On 7 March, an independent audit by KPMG of financial transactions by all members of the governing board of the bank found no breach of regulations occurred.

=== Post-SNB ===
In 2012, Hildebrand was a senior visiting fellow at Oxford University’s Blavatnik School of Government.

Hildebrand joined BlackRock in 2012 as vice chairman of BlackRock, where he oversees the BlackRock Investment Institute (BII).

In 2020, the Swiss government nominated Hildebrand as its candidate to succeed Angel Gurría in the position of Secretary-General of the Organisation for Economic Co-operation and Development (OECD) for a five-year term. By February 2021, he withdrew his candidacy, citing insufficient levels of support among OECD member countries.

On May 30, 2022, he was elected President of the Zürcher Kunstgesellschaft, taking office on July 1, 2022.

== Other activities ==
- Blavatnik School of Government, University of Oxford, Member of the International Advisory Board
- British Museum, Member of the Board of Trustees
- University of Toronto, Member of the International Leadership Council
- International Monetary Fund (IMF), Member of the Board of Governors (2010–2012)

== Recognition ==
- 2011 – "Central Bank Governor of the Year 2012", awarded by The Banker

== Personal life ==
Hildebrand was a member of the Swiss national swimming team in the 1980s, and he was Swiss national champion in 1983 and 1984.

He was married to Kashya Mahmood-Hildebrand until May 2013.

Until 2022, his partner was Margarita Louis-Dreyfus, the Russian-born Swiss billionaire businesswoman, chairman of Louis Dreyfus and the former owner of Olympique de Marseille football team. She gave birth to their twins daughters Isabella and Arina on 20 March 2016.

Philipp married Kimberley Julius in April 2024.
