= Joseph Roduit =

Swiss priest (1939–2015)

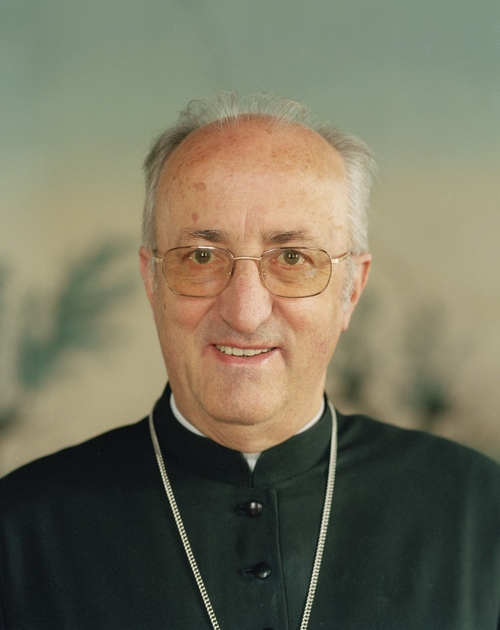
Photo of Abbot Joseph Roduit

Joseph Roduit CRA (December 17, 1939 – December 17, 2015) was a Roman Catholic priest and abbot.

Joseph Roduit completed his theological training at the University of Fribourg prior to his ordination as a priest. He became a regular canon of St. Augustine on November 15, 1964, and was ordained on September 4, 1965. Following his ordination, he served in the Diocese of Sion, particularly in the parishes of Vollèges and Bagnes. He later joined the Abbey of Saint-Maurice, where he held the positions of prior and master of novices. From 1999 until 2015, Rodult served as abbot of the Saint-Maurice d'Agaune, Switzerland. Roduit retired on March 18, 2015.
