= Attell =

Attell is a surname.

Notable people with the name include:

- Abe Attell (1883–1970), American boxer
- Dave Attell (born 1965), American comedian and actor
- Monte Attell (1885–1960), American boxer
- Phil Attell (born 1957), Australian rugby league footballer
