= Kaiseraugst Nuclear Power Plant =

Nuclear Power Plant in Switzerland

- Country: Switzerland
- Location: Kaiseraugst (AG)
- Coordinates: 47°32′24″N 7°44′56″E
- Status: Project abandoned
- Construction began: 1974
- Commission date: never
- Operator: Kernkraftwerk Kaiseraugst AG

Power generation
- Units planned: 1 x 1,000 MW

The site for the Kaiseraugst Nuclear Power Plant is located in north-west Switzerland beside the river at Kaiseraugst, a short distance to the east of Basel.

Plans to build and operate the power plant were the subject of increasingly high-profile controversy over many years. The project failed because of bitter and ultimately effective opposition from the local population and because it became a cause célèbre for environmentalist pressure groups in Switzerland and across German speaking central Europe more generally. The matter hit the headlines most powerfully in 1975, with an eleven-week occupation of the site by a large number of people (estimated, initially, at around 15,000 people). The project was finally abandoned in 1988.

== History ==
The local energy generation company, Motor-Columbus, designed the Kaiseraugst Nuclear Power Plant in response to growing electricity consumption in Switzerland. In order to cover the perceived power generation shortfall as quickly as possible, attempts were made to accelerate the planning and authorization phases of the project. For political reasons the intended timetable turned out to be unachievable, however. In the end the planning phase lasted more than twenty years, and by 1988 the project had absorbed 1.3 billion Swiss francs.

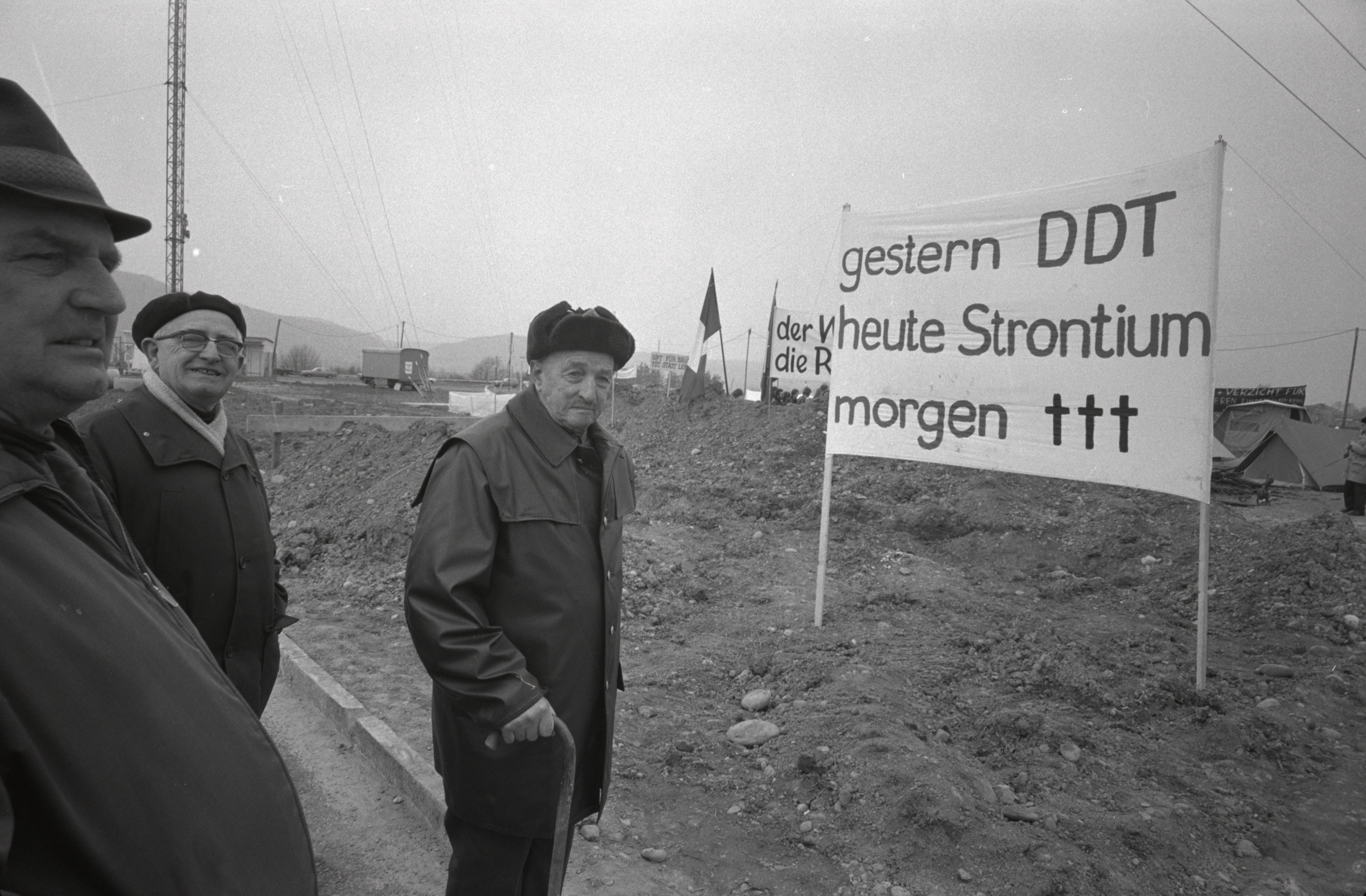
Protest 1975

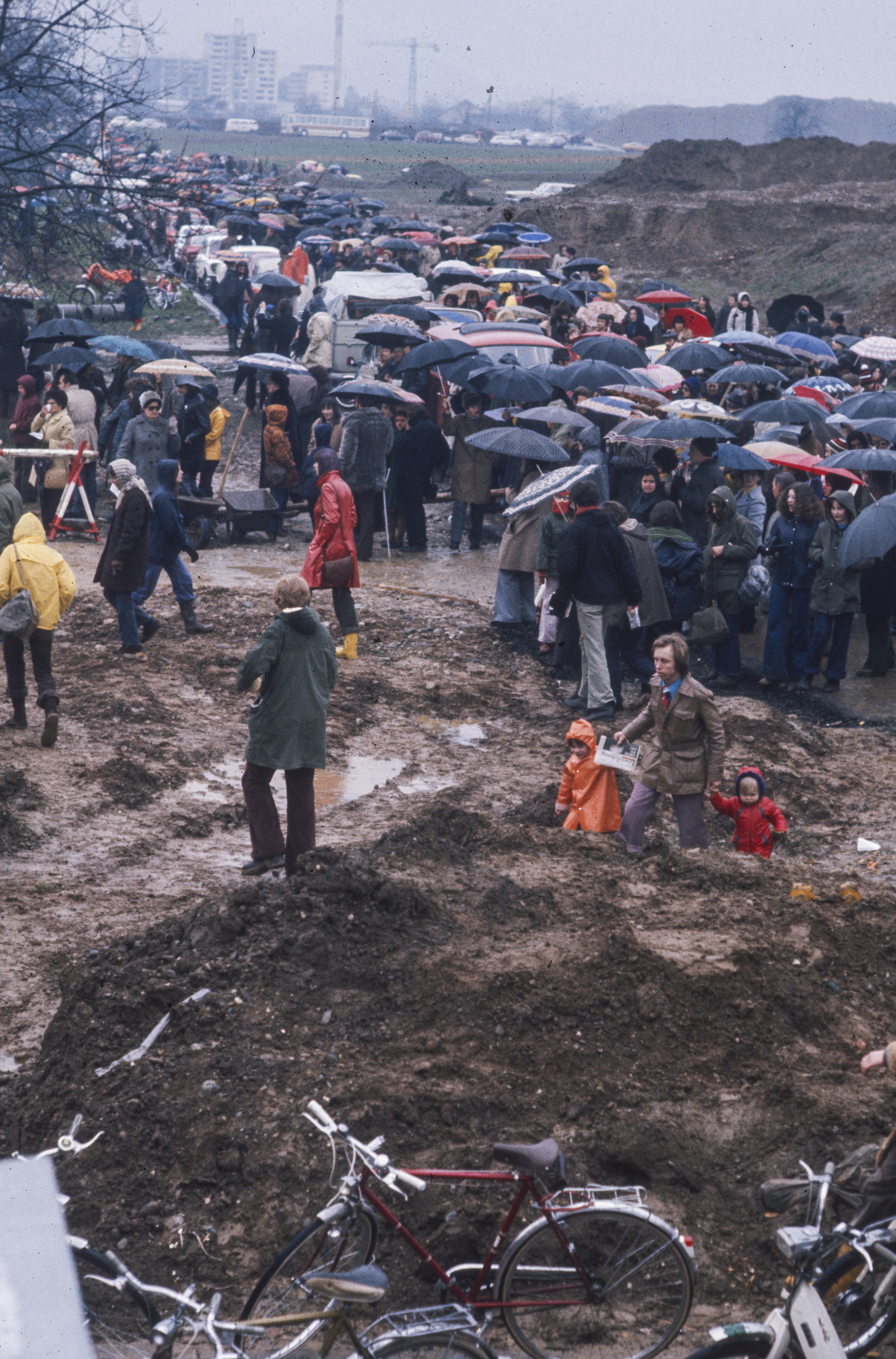
Demonstration, ca. April 1975

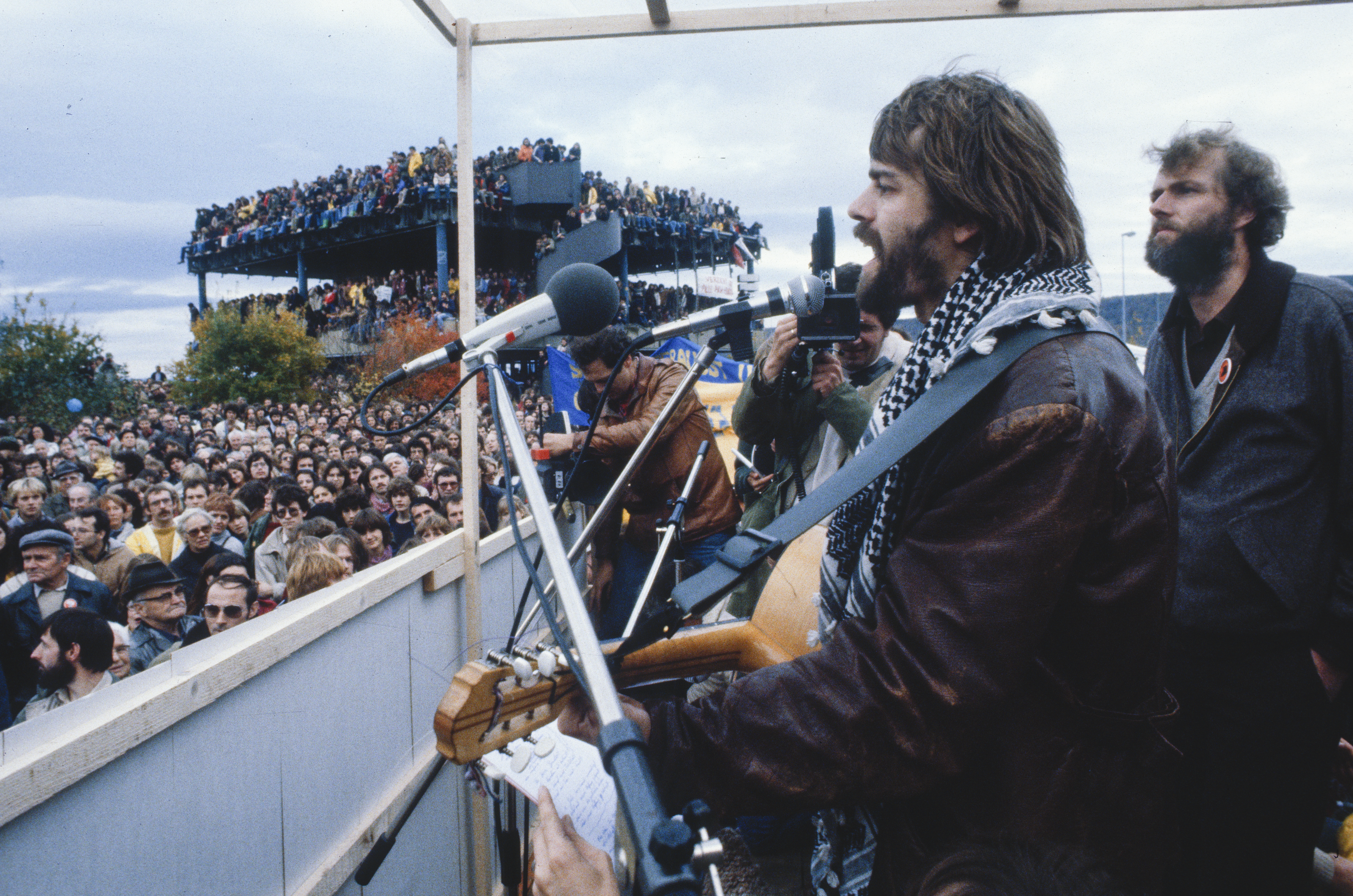
Demonstration 1983

Opposition to the Kaiseraugst Nuclear Plant began early in the decade. In May 1970 the first Switzerland-wide organised opposition group to an atomic power plant project, the NAK, was established. It later became better known as the NWA

A critical decision of the Federal Court was delivered in July 1973, when it was determined that the municipality of Kaiseraugst and the nearby urban canton of Basel-Stadt could not file a valid complaint against the project with the court. The court held that the constitutional position and the relevant legislation left the federal (i.e. national) state as the sole authorizing body in this case.

The federal authorities examined a range of scenarios, always focused on the need to secure national energy supplies. In the end they endorsed the Kaiseraugst Nuclear Plant, however. After this the project was rejected by many. At that time others saw things differently, however. Nationally the majority in Switzerland supported the use of nuclear power generation.

Outline permission to locate an 850 MW power station at Kaiseraugst was granted on 28 August 1972. There was also provision for repositioning the plant by 600 meters within the site in order to allow for the erection of cooling towers. Concrete project planning began in 1974.

In April 1975 the site for the power plant was occupied by activists. This was the second such occupation, but this time it involved around 15,000 people which was enough to hamper excavation work, which had already started. In the end the start of the construction was delayed this time by eleven weeks as a result of resistance by the demonstrators. Less than four years later, in February 1979, the "Information Pavilion" for the planned nuclear power plant was blown up by militant project opponents. The force of the explosion also lifted into the air an Audi, parked nearby and belonging to Michael Kohn, president of Kernkraftwerke Gösgen AG and initiator of the power plant construction.

On 28 October 1981 the Federal government mandated an upgrade, raising the output of the planned power plant from 900 to 1,000 MW. Between 17 and 25 September 1985, three different reactor types were more closely considered, all three of them variously configured water cooled reactors:

- A "Type BWR-6", evaluated with two different standard Containment building types, and produced by General Electric
- A "Type SWR-72" produced by Kraftwerk Union (and subsequently installed at the Gundremmingen Nuclear Power Plant in Bavaria).
- A "Type SWR-75" produced by ABB

Two years later, in 1987, authorization was given for construction using an air cooled device, although the option of adding cooling towers had to remain open. Finally all the prerequisites were put in place for a comprehensive Emergency Plan, having regard to the Basel region's seismic record. The next stage, which could no longer be deferred, involved selecting a supplier for the reactor. That stage would never be completed, however, because a contract for a reactor was never signed. In 1988 the project was dropped on economic grounds.

According to government figures the total loss to Kernkraftwerk Kaiseraugst AG had reached between 1.1 and 1.3 billion francs.

== See also ==
- Nuclear power in Switzerland
