= Jean-Pierre Roth =

Swiss banker

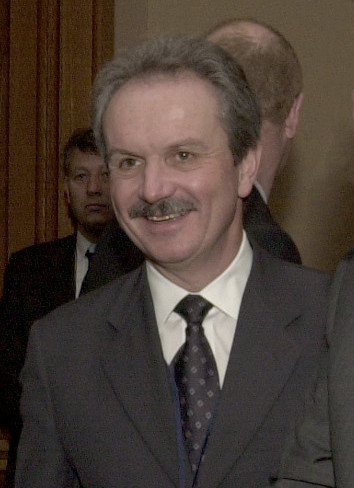
Jean-Pierre Roth in 2001

Jean-Pierre Roth (born on 28 April 1946) is a Swiss banker who served as chairman of the Swiss National Bank from 1 January 2001 until 31 December 2009.

He joined the Swiss National Bank in 1979, working in Zürich and Bern. He became vice-chairman of the governing board in 1996. In 2001, he became chairman of the governing board.

Between 2001 and 2009 he was Governor of the Washington-based International Monetary Fund (IMF) for Switzerland and chairman of the board of directors of the Bank for International Settlements (BIS) in Basel.

Roth has been credited with the measures taken to restore public confidence in the Swiss banking system.

He has been a member of the Board of Directors of Swatch Group since 2010, of Swiss Re from 2010 to 2016 and of Nestlé from 2010 to 2019. He was Chairman of Banque cantonale de Genève from 2010 to 2017. He has been Vice Chairman of Arab Bank Switzerland since 2017 and a member of the Board of Directors of MKS (Switzerland) since 2014. He was a member of the Board of Trustees of Avenir Suisse from 2010 to 2018. He was also a member of the ETH Zurich Foundation.

== Education ==
He received a doctorate in economics from the Graduate Institute of International Studies in Geneva. He pursued postdoctoral studies at Massachusetts Institute of Technology (MIT).

== Personal life ==
Roth is married and has three children. In 2009, he took an early retirement.
