= Swiss National Bank =

Central Bank of Switzerland

Swiss National Bank Schweizerische Nationalbank Banque nationale suisse Banca nazionale svizzera Banca naziunala svizra

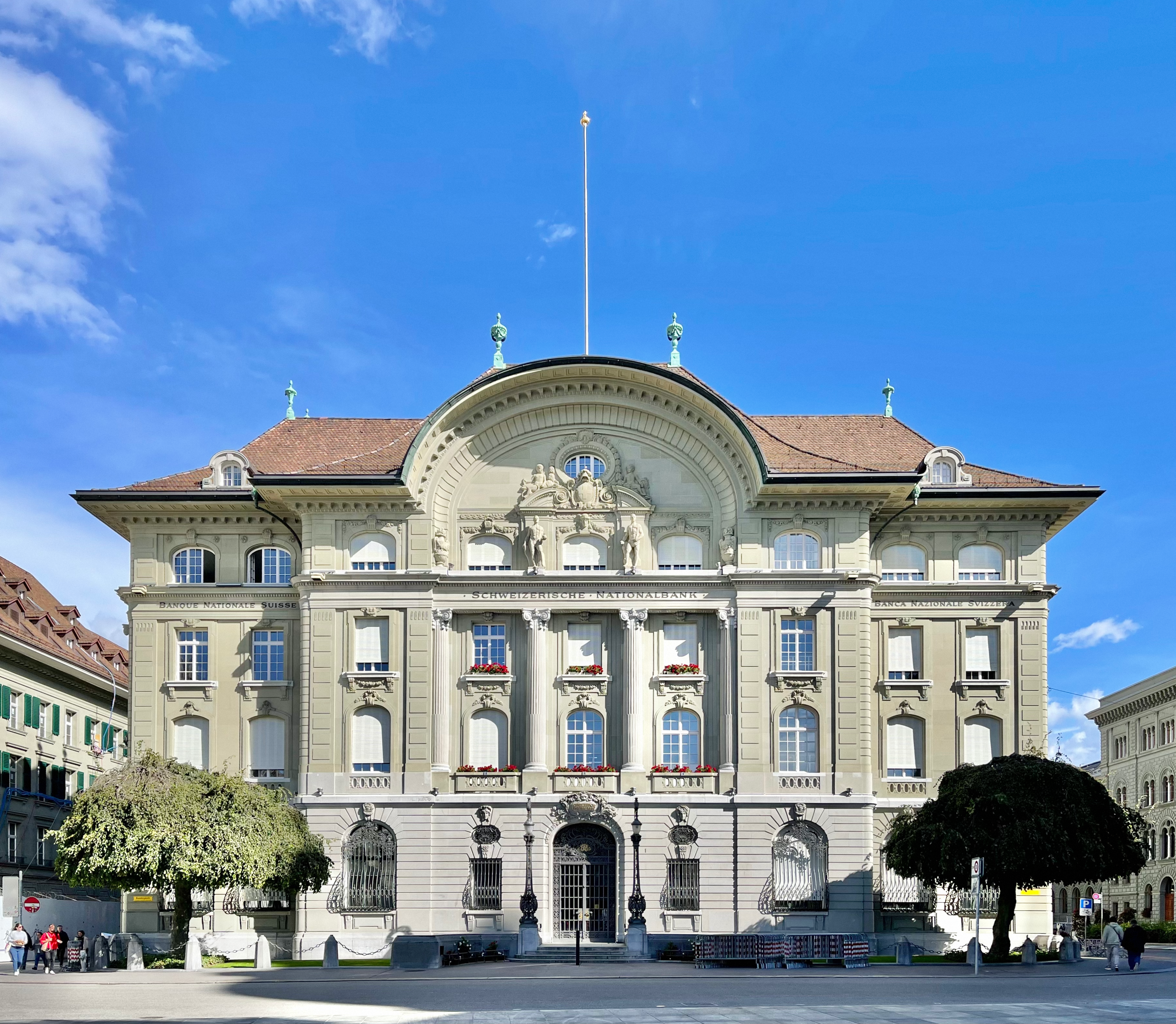
- Headquarters on the Bundesplatz in Bern
- Central bank of: Switzerland
- Headquarters: Bern and Zurich
- Established: 16 January 1906 – 20 June 1907
- Ownership: Mixed ownership. Around 78% owned by Swiss public entities, the rest are publicly traded (SIX: SNBN).
- Chairman: Martin Schlegel
- Currency: Swiss franc CHF (ISO 4217)
- Reserves: US$940 billion (2022)
- Interest rate target: 0%
- Website: www.snb.ch

The Swiss National Bank (SNB; German: Schweizerische Nationalbank; French: Banque nationale suisse; Italian: Banca nazionale svizzera; Romansh: Banca naziunala svizra) is the central bank of Switzerland, responsible for the nation's monetary policy and the sole issuer of Swiss franc banknotes. The primary goal of its mandate is to ensure price stability, while taking economic developments into consideration.

The SNB is an Aktiengesellschaft under special regulations and has two head offices, one in Bern and the other in Zurich.

== History ==
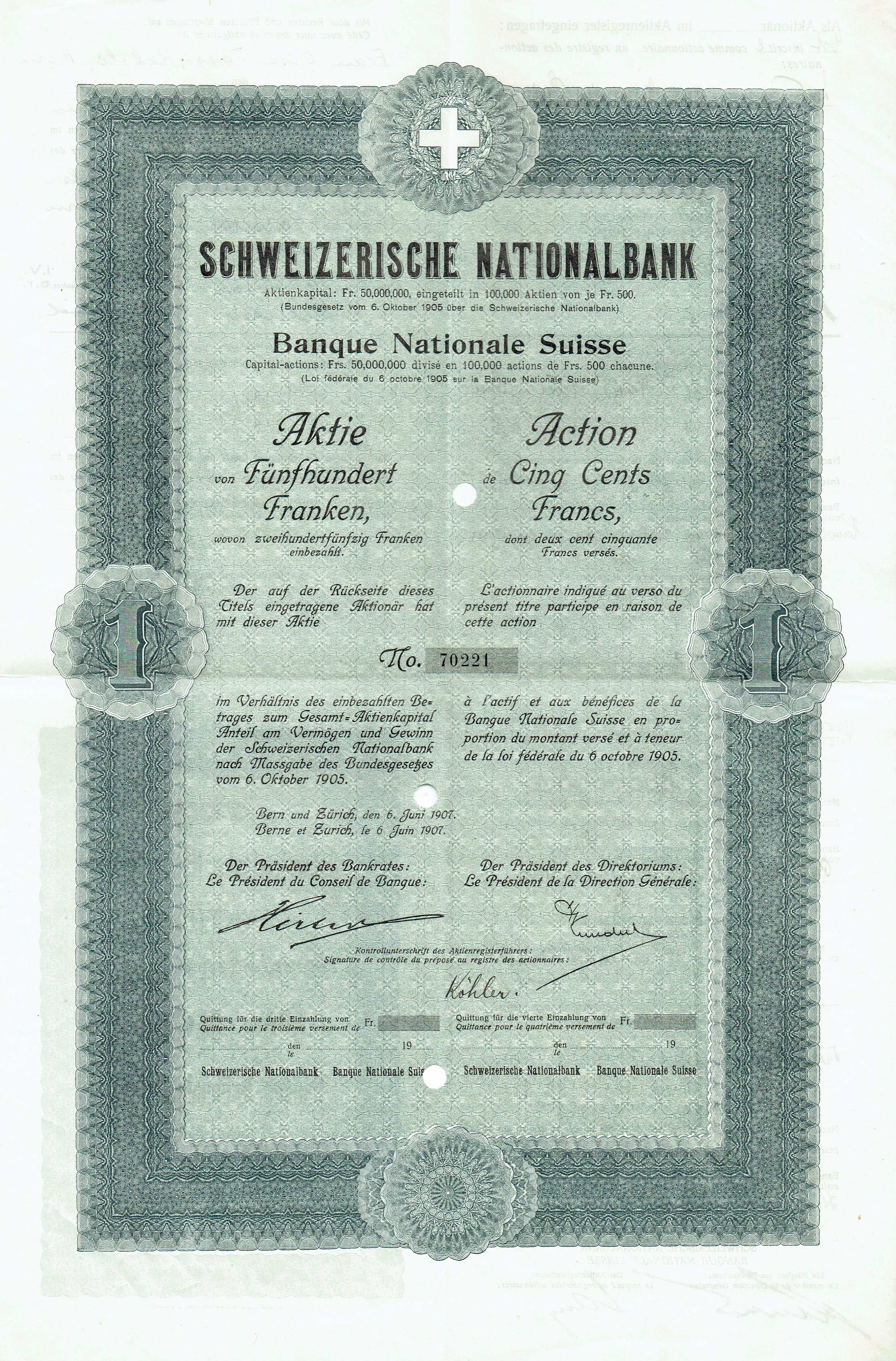
Share of the Swiss National Bank, issued 6 June 1907

The bank formed as a result of the need for a reduction in the number of commercial banks issuing banknotes, which numbered 53 sometime after 1826. In the 1874 revision of the Federal Constitution it was given the task to oversee laws concerning the issuing of banknotes. In 1891, the Federal Constitution was revised again to entrust the Confederation with sole rights to issue banknotes.

=== 1905 foundation ===
The Swiss National Bank was founded under the law of 6 October 1905 ('the National Bank Act'), which entered into force on 16 January 1906. Business was started on 20 June 1907.

=== World War I ===
Sometime during World War I (1914–1917) the bank instructed to release notes of small denomination, for the first time, by the Federal Council of Switzerland.

=== Interwar years ===
The Federal Council devalued the Swiss Franc during 1936, and as a result there was made available to the National Bank an amount of money, which the bank subsequently stored in a Währungsausgleichsfonds reserve for use in future situations of emergency.

=== World War II ===
The Swiss National Bank provided 1.2 billion CHF to the Reichsbank. Of this, a value of approximately 780 million CHF of the gold given to the National Bank was gold which had been looted by the forces of Germany. In addition the National Bank also exchanged between 1.2 and 1.6 billion CHF for gold from the Allied forces. During 20 April 1944, gold from the gold reserves of Italy arrived from Como at the railway station within Chiasso.

There is controversy over the role of the Swiss National Bank in the transfer of Nazi gold during World War II. The SNB was the largest gold distribution centre in continental Europe before the war. A study by the U.S. Department of State in 1997 notes that the bank "must have known that some portion of the gold it was receiving from the Reichsbank was looted from occupied countries". This was confirmed by the Swiss Bergier commission in 1998 which concluded that the SNB received US$440 million in gold from Nazi sources, of which US$316 million is estimated to have been looted.

The gold from Nazi governorship sources was in the form of lingots containing gold looted from central banks of Europe and gold from Jews executed within the concentration camps established by the machination of the Nazi regime, which the SNB took without knowing these facts at the time, nor inquiring to any great degree in the process of its transfer into the possession of the SNB, according to Robert Vogler, a former archivist of the SNB.

=== Post-war 20th century ===
In 1981 the bank participated in research involving Orell Füssli and an optical research group named Landis+Gyr, on matters of banknote design.

During 1994 the bank was described as a joint-stock company acting under the administration and supervision of the Confederation. It had eight branches and twenty sub-branches within cantons. The governing board had overall executive management of the National Bank, with supervision entrusted to its shareholders, the banks' council, the banks' committee, its local committees and auditing committee. The three members of the governing board together decided the monetary policy of the Swiss National Bank. Towards the end of 1993 it had 566 employees.

=== 2004: formal independence from government ===
With the inception of Article 99 of the Swiss Federal Constitution, in May 2004, the National Bank achieved formal independence.

=== 2008: UBS bailout ===
SNB and the Swiss government engineered a bailout plan for UBS in October 2008 during the subprime mortgage crisis. SNB, agreeing to take over around $60 billion of UBS's toxic assets, created a special-purpose vehicle called the SNB StabFund, to park the securities. Within a few years, SNB was able to free itself from UBS's illiquid securities, making a CHF 5 billion profit in the process.

=== 2011: euro exchange rate cap ===
The SNB announced on 6 September 2011 to set a minimum exchange rate of CHF 1.20 per euro and that it would "enforce this minimum rate with the utmost determination and is prepared to buy foreign currency in unlimited quantities" in order to take measures to stem the development of a possible recession. The bank stated the 1.20 exchange rate was defendable as the bank could potentially proceed to mint enough banknotes to control the rate sufficiently.

The SNB announced on 15 January 2015 the euro currency arrangement would end as the euro crisis had passed and the Europeans would be making financial policy changes.

=== Ownership as of 2021 ===
As of 31 December 2021, 78.17% of voting shares were held by public shareholders (cantons, cantonal banks, etc.). The remaining shares were largely in the hands of private persons. Shares of the SNB have been listed at the SIX Swiss Exchange since 1907. As of April 2022, Theo Siegert, a German entrepreneur, held 5.05% of its stocks, and as such, he was the third-largest shareholder, between the Canton of Vaud (3.401%) and the Canton of Zürich (5.2%). The national bank's statutes, though, limit the voting rights of private investors to 100 shares.

=== 2022 losses ===
On 9 January 2023 the SNB reported a loss of 132 billion CHF in its annual results for 2022. As many cantons expected dividend payments from the SNB, some cantons had to revise their budgets or even tap their financial reserves. For example, a planned tax decrease in the canton of Thurgau had to be postponed. Likewise, the federal government had budgeted a 666 million CHF income from SNB.

=== 2023 liquidity assistance ===
On 16 March 2023, Credit Suisse sought to shore up their finances by taking a loan of CHF 50 billion from SNB after the bank's share price dropped nearly 25 percent after Saudi National Bank, its largest investor, said it could not provide more financial assistance due to its regulatory restrictions. Despite the intervention, a bank run occurred that week, causing SNB and the Swiss government to fast-track UBS taking over Credit Suisse. To support the acquisition of Credit Suisse by UBS, the SNB offered liquidity assistance of up to CHF 100 billion.

=== 2025 ===
In May 2025, the Swiss National Bank considered cutting interest rates below zero to combat low inflation, which fell to 0% in April, the lowest in four years. And on June 19, the SNB officially did, cutting the policy interest rate by 25 basis points, dropping it down 0.00%. Chairman Martin Schlegel emphasized the SNB's readiness to implement negative rates and intervene in foreign exchange markets to weaken the Swiss franc, aiming to support exporters and maintain price stability.

=== 2026 ===
During the first half of 2026, the Swiss National Bank experienced a substantial financial recovery. The bank reported a half a year profit of CHF 25.2 billion.

== Responsibilities ==
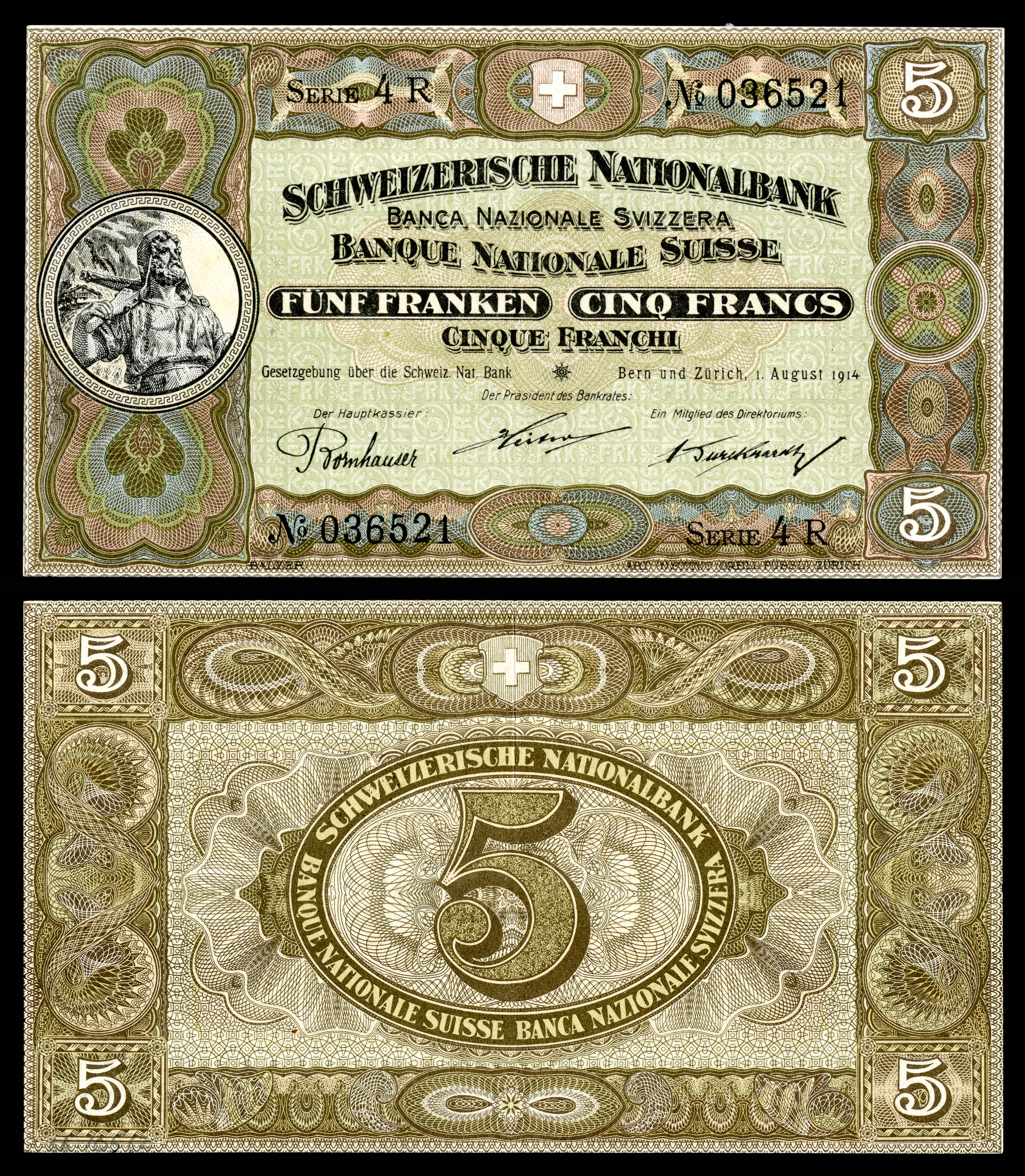
Schweizerische Nationalbank (Swiss National Bank), 5 Franken (1914). The portrait depicts William Tell (based on Richard Kissling's monument in Altdorf), with the Rütli Mountain in the distance. Signed by K. Bornhauser (Chief Cashier), Johann-Daniel Hirter (President of the Swiss National Bank Council), and August Burckhardt (Board member).

The basic governing principles of the National Bank are contained within Article 99 of the Federal Constitution, which deals with matters of monetary policy. There are three numbered factors concerning principles explicitly mentioning the Nationalbank, of four altogether shown within the Article. The SNB is therefore obliged by constitutional statute law to act in accordance with the economic interests of Switzerland. Accordingly, the prime function of the Nationalbank is:

to pursue a reliable monetary policy for the benefit of the Swiss economy and the Swiss people.

The National Bank publishes within its own site a list of research done as work in progress by staff members, which begin at 2004 (2 papers), to 2005 (2), 2006 (11), 2007 (17), 2008 (19), 2009 (16), 2010 (19), 2011 (14), 2012 (16), 2013 (11), 2014 (13), and to 1 August 2015 there is shown nine papers, a list of eight economic studies which relate to the tasks of the bank, listed from 2005, in addition to a bi-annually published update of research, listed from 2012 to the present.

=== Cash supply and distribution ===
The National Bank is entrusted with the note-issuing privilege. It supplies the economy with banknotes. It is also charged by the Confederation with the task of coin distribution.

=== Cashless payment transactions ===
In the field of cashless payment transactions, the National Bank provides services for payments between banks. These are settled in the Swiss Interbank Clearing (SIC) system via sight deposit accounts held with the National Bank.

=== Investment of currency reserves ===
The National Bank manages currency reserves. These engender confidence in the Swiss franc, help to prevent and overcome crises and may be utilized for interventions in the foreign exchange market.

=== Financial system stability ===
The National Bank contributes to the stability of the financial system by acting as an arbiter over monetary policy. Within the context of this task, it analyses sources of risk to the financial system, oversees systemically important payment and securities settlement systems and helps to promote an operational environment for the financial sector.

=== International monetary cooperation ===
Together with the federal authorities, the National Bank participates in international monetary cooperation and provides technical assistance.

=== Banker to the Confederation ===
The Swiss National Bank acts as banker to the Swiss Confederation. It processes payments on behalf of the Confederation, issues money market debt register claims and bonds, handles the safekeeping of securities and carries out money market and foreign exchange transactions.

=== Statistics ===
The National Bank compiles statistical data on banks and financial markets, the balance of payments, the international investment position and the Swiss financial accounts.

== Policies ==
=== Investments ===
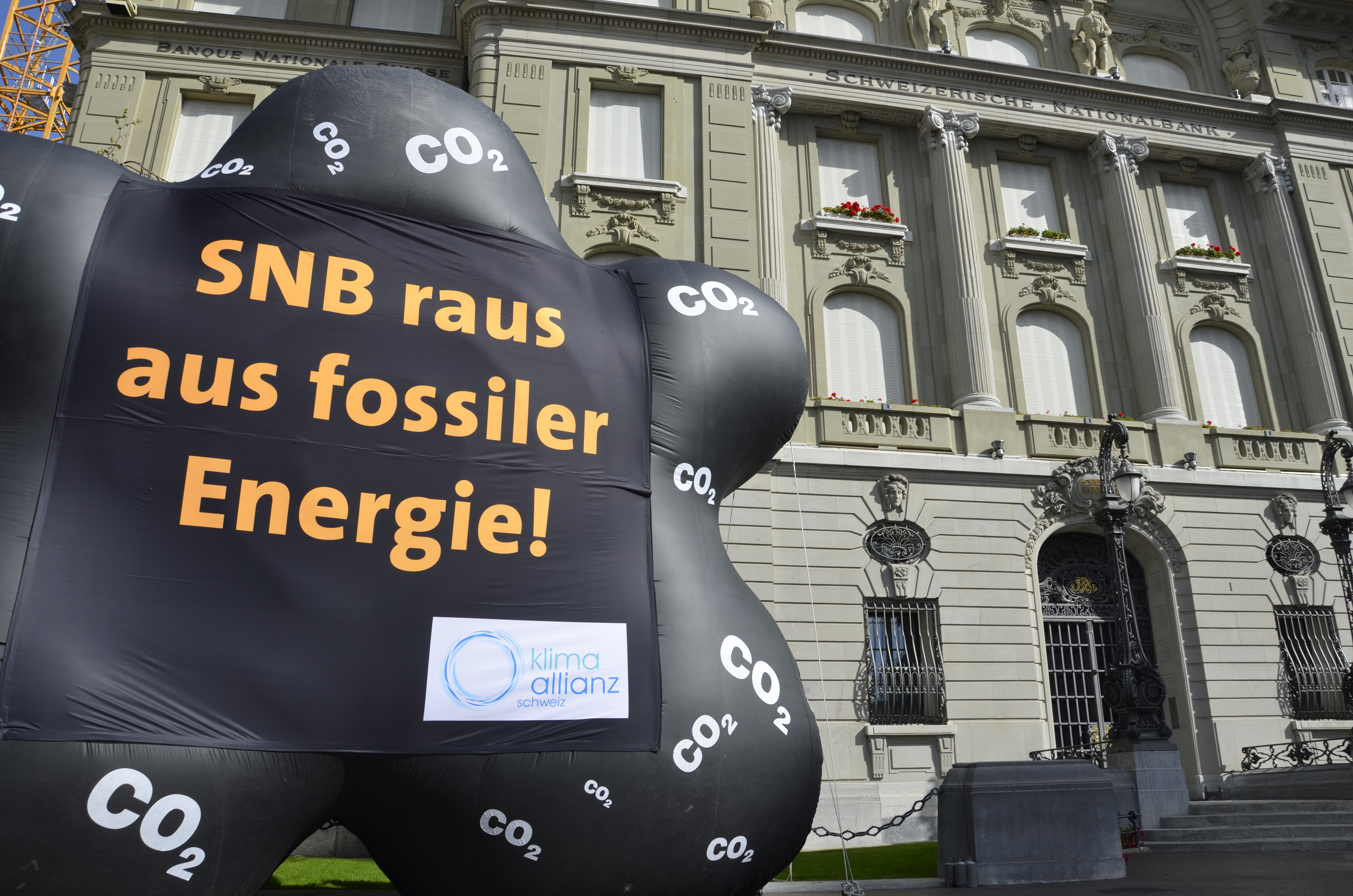
Sign asking the Swiss National Bank to divest from fossil fuels, at a climate demonstration in Bern (2019)

The Swiss National Bank invests its assets, particularly in the stock market. In 2018, its share portfolio stood at 153 billion Swiss francs.

According to its guidelines, it "avoids shares in companies which produce internationally banned weapons, seriously violate fundamental human rights or systematically cause severe environmental damage".

Since 2016, environmental associations and academics criticize the fact that these investments do not take into account the Paris Climate Agreement (article 2) and are responsible for at least 50 million tons of carbon dioxide emissions in 2017.

=== Monetary policy ===
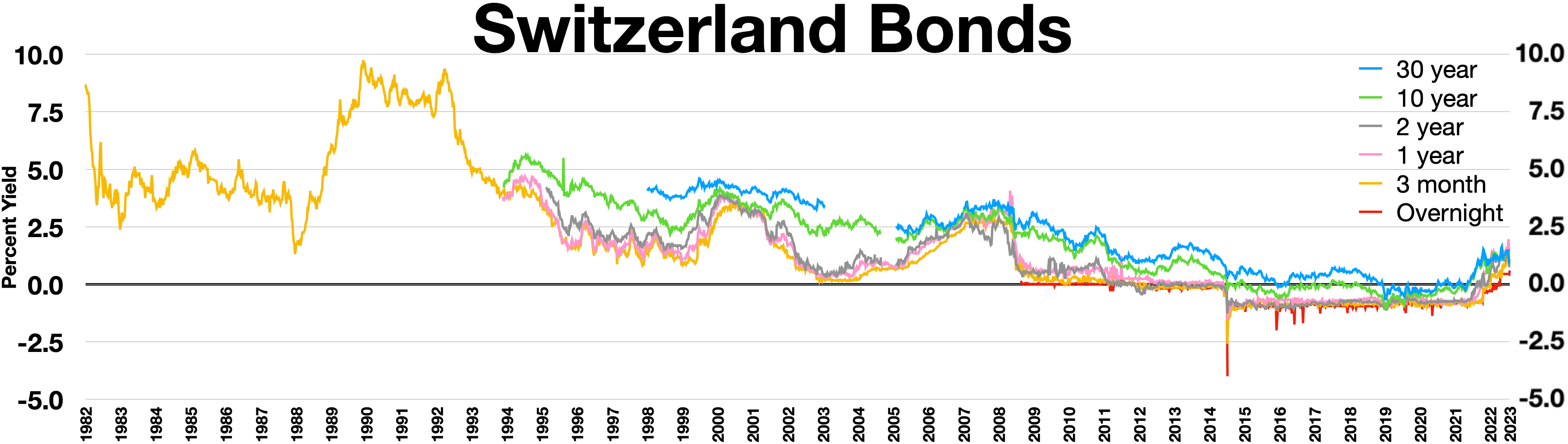
Switzerland bonds Inverted yield curve in 2023 30 year 10 year 2 year 1 year 3 month Overnight

The Swiss National Bank pursues a monetary policy serving the interests of the country as a whole. It must ensure price stability, while taking due account of economic developments. Monetary policy affects production and prices with a considerable time lag. Consequently, it is based on inflation forecasts rather than current inflation.

The SNB's monetary policy strategy consists of three elements: a definition of price stability (the SNB equates price stability with a rise in the national consumer price index of less than 2% per year), a medium-term conditional inflation forecast, and, at operational level, a target range for a reference interest rate, which is the Libor for three-month investments in Swiss francs.

== Governance ==
=== General Meeting of Shareholders ===
The general meeting of shareholders is held once a year, usually in April. Owing to the SNB's public mandate, the powers of the shareholders' meeting are not as extensive as in joint-stock companies under private law.

=== Bank Council ===
The Bank Council oversees and controls the conduct of business by the Swiss National Bank and consists of 11 members. Six members, including the President and Vice President, are appointed by the Federal Council, and five by the Shareholders' Meeting. The Bank Council sets up four committees from its own ranks: an Audit Committee, a Risk Committee, a Remuneration Committee and an Appointment Committee.

A list of the Bank Council members is published on the SNB website.

=== Governing board ===
The Swiss National Bank's management and executive body is the governing board. The governing board is responsible in particular for monetary policy, asset management strategy, contributing to the stability of the financial system and international monetary cooperation. The Governing Board consists of three members:

- Chairman: Thomas Jordan
- Vice Chairman: Martin Schlegel
- Member: Antoine Martin

==== Chairmen of the governing board ====
Name	Took office	Left office	Notes
Heinrich Kundert	20 June 1907	30 November 1915	
August Burckhardt	1 December 1915	26 November 1924	
Gottlieb Bachmann	1 July 1925	15 March 1939	
Ernst Weber	1 April 1939	31 March 1947	
Paul Keller	1 April 1947	31 May 1956	
Walter Schwegler	1 June 1956	31 August 1966	
Edwin Stopper	1 September 1966	30 April 1974	
Fritz Leutwiler	1 May 1974	31 December 1984	
Pierre Languetin	1 January 1985	30 April 1988	
Markus Lusser	1 May 1988	30 April 1996	
Hans Meyer	1 May 1996	31 December 2000	
Jean-Pierre Roth	1 January 2001	31 December 2009	
Philipp Hildebrand	1 January 2010	9 January 2012	
Thomas J. Jordan	18 April 2012	30 September 2024	
Martin Schlegel	1 October 2024	Incumbent	

== Gold reserves ==
The SNB manages the official gold reserves of Switzerland, which as of 2008 amount to 1,145 tonnes and are valued at 30.5 billion CHF. The gold is believed to be stored in huge vaults beneath the Federal Square (Bundesplatz) to the north of the federal parliament building in Bern, but the SNB treats the location of the gold reserves as a secret. Independent confirmation of the gold's location was obtained by the Bernese newspaper Der Bund in 2008. It published a photograph of the bullion that a Keystone news agency photographer was allowed to take at the SNB premises in Bern in 2001. Der Bund also quoted a retired official of the city's surveying office as saying that the gold vaults take up an area of roughly half the Federal Square and have a depth of dozens of meters, down to the level of the Aar river. The SNB says that the gold reserves are stored in different safe places in Switzerland (70% -mostly under the Bundesplatz in Berne and at the Bank for International Settlements in Basel) and abroad (i.e. Bank of England and Bank of Canada).

From the latter years of the 1990s until sometime during 2005, the National Bank transferred from its possession (when the gold price was at its historic low) half of its gold reserves, following the Nazi gold affair.

== Study Center Gerzensee ==
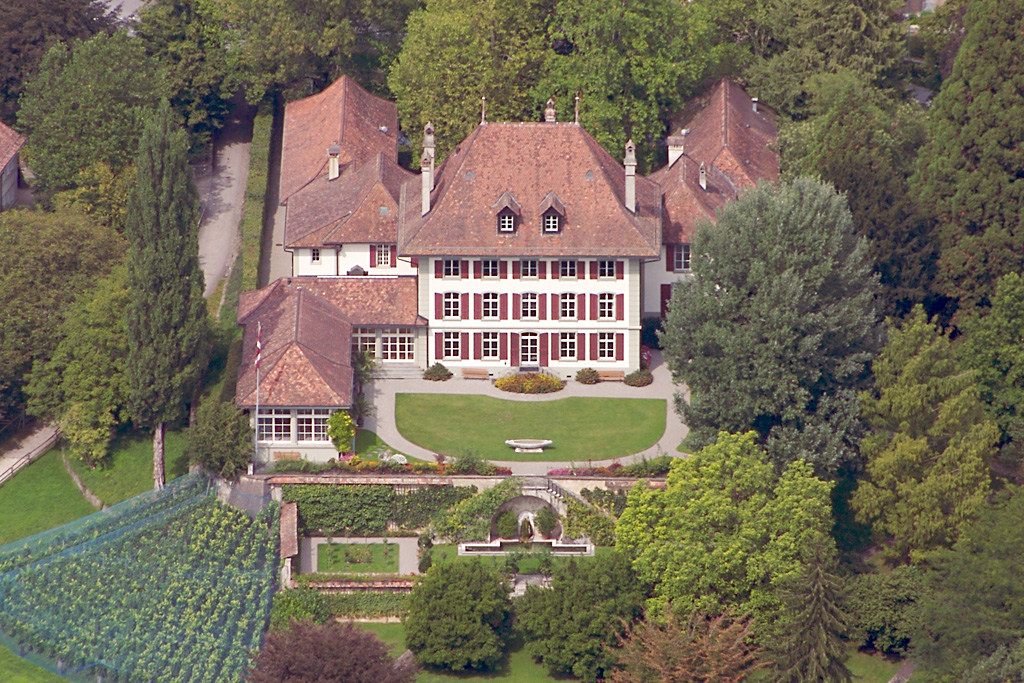
Aerial view of the Gerzensee property

The Study Center Gerzensee, located in Gerzensee, is a foundation established by the SNB and run as an autonomous organization. The SNB in 1980 acquired the New Castle of Gerzensee, a historical property built around 1700, and repurposed it as a training and conference center that opened in 1986. The study center runs several programs of courses and hosts research and policy events, targeted at participants in the global economic research and central banking communities.

== See also ==
- Banking in Switzerland
- Economy of Switzerland
- SARON (Swiss Average Rate Overnight)
- Swiss Financial Market Supervisory Authority (FINMA)
- Swiss gold reserves referendum, 2014
- Swiss sovereign money referendum, 2018
- List of central banks
