= Louis Louis-Dreyfus =

French politician and businessman (1867–1940)

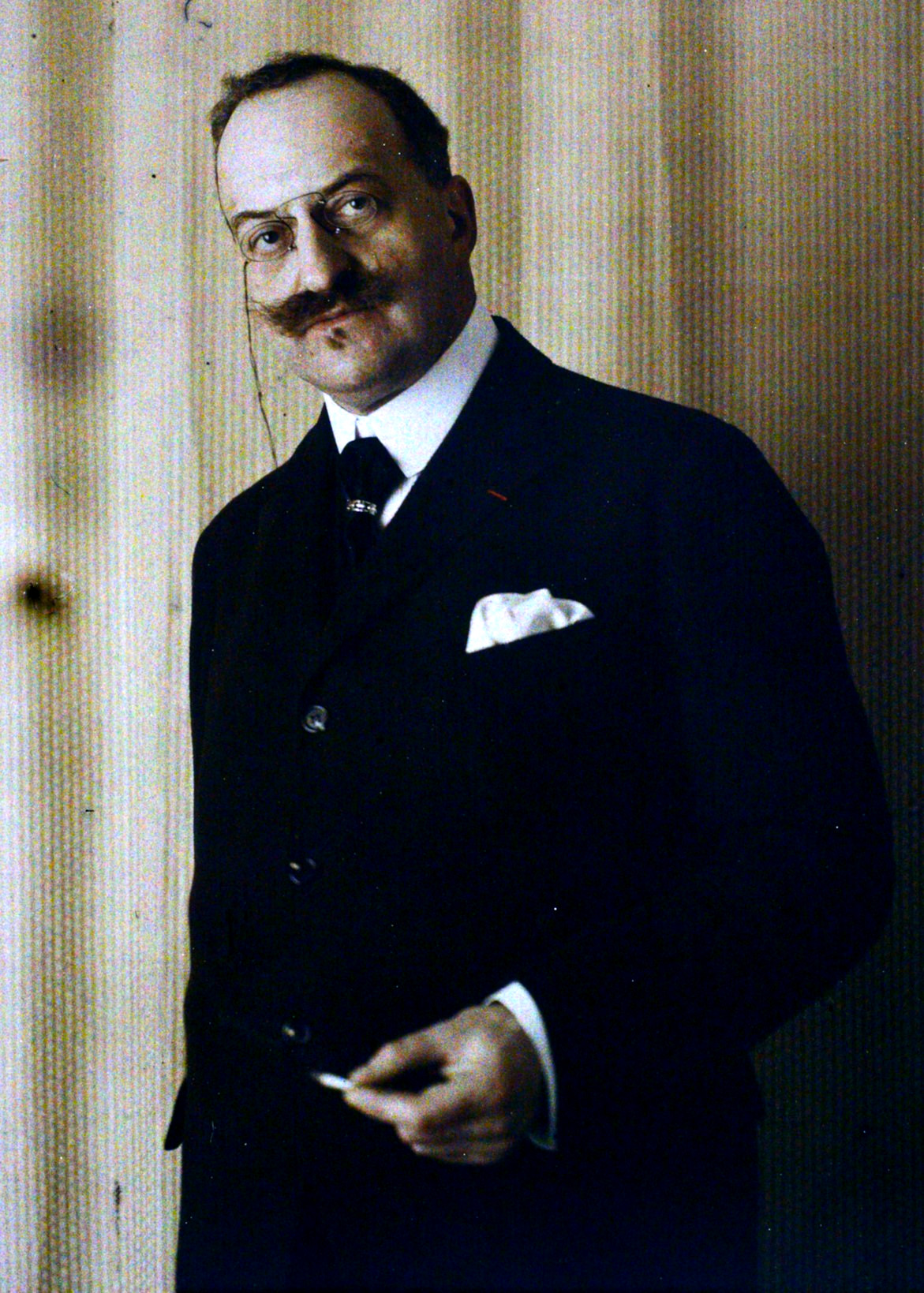
- 1919 Autochrome by Auguste Léon
- Born: September 6, 1867; Zurich, Switzerland
- Died: November 10, 1940 (aged 73); Cannes, France
- Known for: Co-director of Louis Dreyfus Group; member of French Parliament
- Spouse: Emma Lévi
- Children: 2
- Parent(s): Léopold Louis-Dreyfus; Emilie Lang

Louis Louis-Dreyfus (September 6, 1867 – November 10, 1940) was a member of the French parliament and co-director of the commodity distribution and trading company, Louis Dreyfus Group.

== Biography ==
Louis-Dreyfus was born in Zurich to a Jewish family, the eldest of three sons of Léopold Louis-Dreyfus (1833–1915) and Emilie Lang (1840–1918). His brothers were Charles Louis-Dreyfus (1870–1929) and Robert Louis-Dreyfus (1877–1907). In 1851, his father, the son of a farmer from Alsace, founded the commodity distributor and trader Louis Dreyfus Group growing the business to the point that in 1900, it was the world's largest grain distributor. After obtaining his law degree, he joined the family business. In 1915, his father died, turning over the family company to sons Louis and Charles, who served as co-directors. In 1917, the Louis Dreyfus Group was forced out of Russia by the Russian Revolution catalyzing their international expansion. During World War I, the firm expanded into the maritime arms trade supplying the belligerents to war. In 1924, they expanded to South Africa and in the 1920s and 1930s built up their own shipping company, LD Lines. Known as the "King of Wheat," the Dreyfus Group dominated the grain trade through the Great Depression and up to the outbreak of World War II purchasing grain at low cost in producing countries and selling at a higher price in countries that had shortages.

Louis-Dreyfus served in the French Parliament during the French Third Republic as a deputy from Lozère from 1905 to 1910, a deputy from Alpes-Maritimes from 1930 to 1936, and a senator from Alpes-Maritimes from 1937 to 1940. He was a member of the Independents of the Left from 1930 to 1936. The Independents of the Left were one of a number of parliamentary groups that made up the Democratic Republican Alliance between 1928 and 1936.

Louis-Dreyfus and his brother were shareholders in the French Communist paper l'Humanité.

== Property seizures under Vichy France ==
In July 1940, the Vichy France, under Marshal Petain, ordered confiscation of the wealth and private estates of Baron Edouard de Rothschild and Louis Louis-Dreyfus because of their Jewish heritage.

== Personal life ==
In 1906 he married Emma Lévi (1885–?); they had two children: Jean Louis-Dreyfus (1908–2003) and François Louis-Dreyfus (1910–1958). He was nicknamed King Two Louis by journalist Léon Daudet and – thanks to his wealth and very public profile as both a politician and businessman – was often referred to as the "Richest Man in France."

After Louis Louis-Dreyfus's death in 1940 in Cannes in a carriage accident, his son Jean, and his two nephews, François Louis-Dreyfus (1909–1958) and Pierre Louis-Dreyfus (1908–2011) took over the family company.
