= Charlie Hall (actor, born 1997) =

American actor

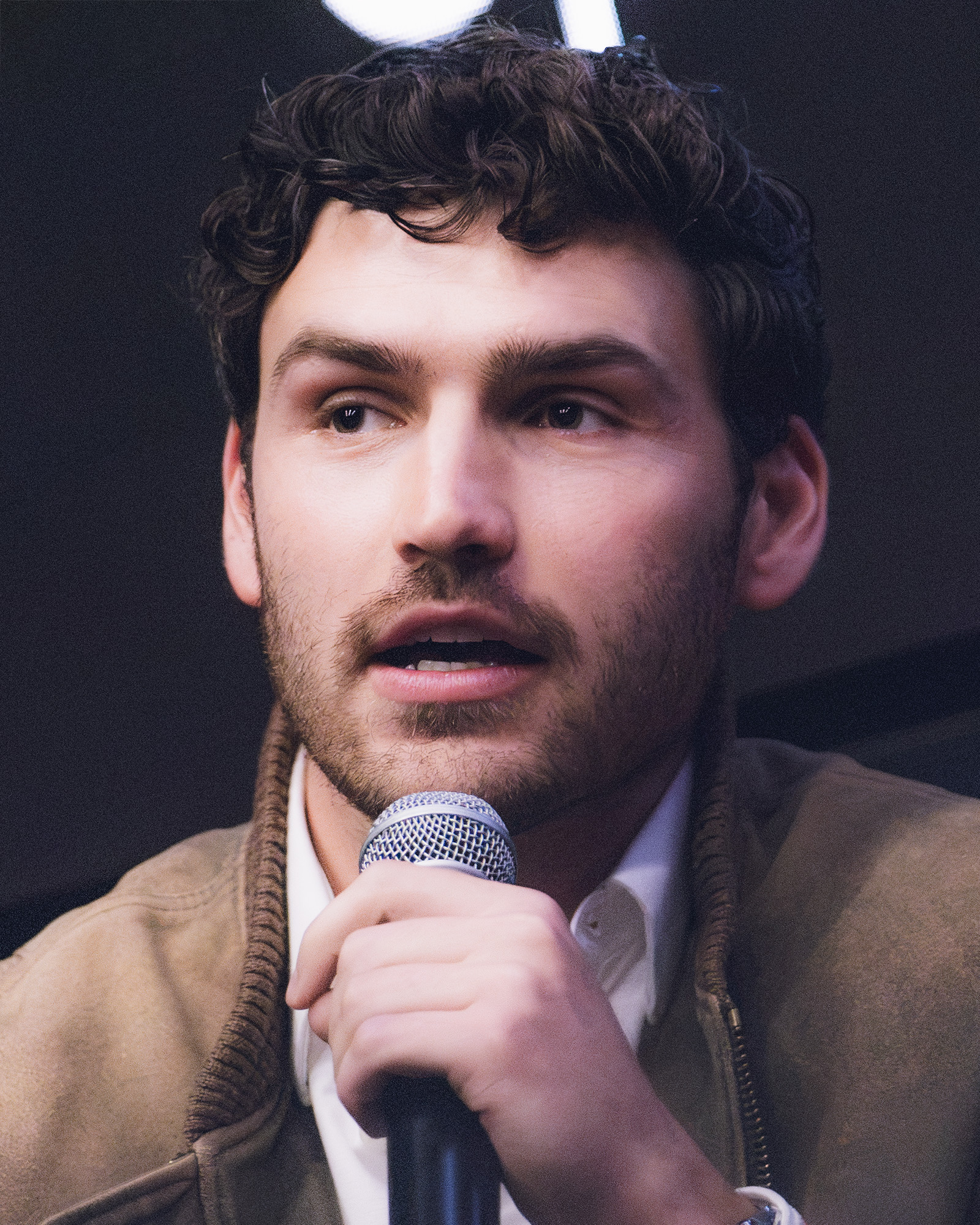
- Hall in 2026
- Born: May 30, 1997 (age 29)
- Education: Northwestern University
- Occupation: Actor
- Years active: 2019–present
- Television: Bel-Air; Big Shot
- Parents: Brad Hall (father); Julia Louis-Dreyfus (mother)
- Relatives: Lauren Bowles (half-aunt); Gérard Louis-Dreyfus (grandfather); Pierre Louis-Dreyfus (great grandfather); Charles Louis-Dreyfus (great-great-grandfather); Léopold Louis-Dreyfus (great-great-great-grandfather)

Charles Thompson Hall (born May 30, 1997) is an American television and film actor.

== Early life and education ==
Charlie Hall was born on May 30, 1997, to actors Julia Louis-Dreyfus and Brad Hall. He has an older brother, Henry Hall, who is a musician and an actor. Hall attended the Crossroads School for Arts & Sciences in Santa Monica, California. He then attended college at Northwestern University, the alma mater of both his parents, where he majored in radio, television, and film and played basketball for the Wildcats.

== Career ==
Hall’s television roles have included an appearance in HBO series Veep. He made his film debut in Amy Poehler‘s 2021 film Moxie. He also created his own web series in 2020 called Sorry, Charlie with his friend since high school, Jack Price.

Hall plays Tyler Laramy, a member of the Bel-Air basketball team on the Fresh Prince of Bel Air re-boot series Bel Air. He also had roles in Single Drunk Female, and Love, Victor.

In 2022 Hall joined the second season of The Sex Lives of College Girls as a recurring character, Essex College student Andrew. He plays Nick for Disney+ on series two of Big Shot, and played Simon in the HBO Max feature Sweethearts opposite Kiernan Shipka and Nico Hiraga.

== Filmography ==
Year	Title	Role	Notes	Ref.
2019	Veep	Eddie Axler	Episode: "Discovery Weekend"	
2020	Sorry, Charlie	Charlie	4 episodes; Also writer	
2020–2022	Love, Victor	Kieran	10 episodes	
2021	Moxie	Bradley	Feature film	
2022–2023	Single Drunk Female	Joel	11 episodes	
2022	Big Shot	Nick Russo	9 episodes	
2022	The Sex Lives of College Girls	Andrew	7 episodes	
2022–2023	Bel-Air	Tyler Laramy	9 episodes	
2024	Life & Beth	Officer Beau	5 episodes	
2024	Monsters: The Lyle and Erik Menendez Story	Craig Cignarelli	4 episodes	
2024	Sweethearts	Simon	Feature film	
2025	Monster: The Ed Gein Story	Deputy Frank Worden	3 episodes	
2026–present	Maximum Pleasure Guaranteed	Rudy	10 episodes	
TBA	The White Lotus †	TBA	Season 4	
