= Gérard Louis-Dreyfus =

French-American businessman (1932–2016)

- Born: Gérard C. Louis-Dreyfus; 21 June 1932; Paris, France
- Died: 16 September 2016 (aged 84); Mount Kisco, New York, U.S.
- Other name: William Louis-Dreyfus
- Education: Duke University (BA, LLB)
- Occupation: Businessman
- Title: Ex-Chairman of Louis Dreyfus Energy Services
- Spouses: Judith LeFever Bowles (m. 1955; div. 1962) Phyllis Blankenship (m. 1965)
- Children: 4, including Julia Louis-Dreyfus
- Parent(s): Pierre Louis-Dreyfus; Dolores Porges (née Neubauer)
- Relatives: Léopold Louis-Dreyfus (paternal great-grandfather); Charles Louis-Dreyfus (paternal grandfather); Brad Hall (son-in-law); Charlie Hall (grandson)

Gérard C. Louis-Dreyfus (21 June 1932 – 16 September 2016), also known as William Louis-Dreyfus, was a French-American businessman. His net worth was estimated at $3.4 billion by Forbes in 2006. He was the chairman of Louis Dreyfus Energy Services and the great-grandson of Léopold Louis-Dreyfus, founder of Louis Dreyfus Group. He was the father of actress Julia Louis-Dreyfus.

== Life and career ==
Louis-Dreyfus was born in Paris in 1932. His great-grandfather Léopold Louis-Dreyfus founded the Louis Dreyfus Group in 1851. His mother, Dolores Porges (née Neubauer; 1905–1987), was American-born, the daughter of a Brazilian father and a Mexican mother. His father, Pierre Louis-Dreyfus (1908–2011), was a Frenchman who headed the Louis Dreyfus group. Pierre, who was Jewish, fought in the French Resistance during World War II; his mother was Catholic. He has one sister, Dominique Cornwell.

Another cousin is Robert Louis-Dreyfus, the former chief executive officer of Adidas and ex-Chairman of French football club Marseille.

In 1940, Louis-Dreyfus moved to the United States with his mother after her divorce from Pierre. By 1945, he had adopted the name William as a symbol of his integration into American society.

After graduating from Duke University and Duke University School of Law, Louis-Dreyfus worked at the law firm of Dewey Ballantine, New York, before joining Louis Dreyfus in 1965. He was chairman of the Poetry Society of America from 1998 to 2008. He had poems published in publications such as The Hudson Review.

== Politics ==
In October 2012, Dreyfus published a full-page ad in The New York Times titled "A Call To Arms To The Wealthy To Protect The Right To Vote" encouraging wealthy people in the United States to fight voter suppression. Dreyfus himself donated $1 million.

Dreyfus was on President Richard Nixon's enemies list.

== Personal life ==
Louis-Dreyfus was married twice. In 1955 he married Judith LeFever. They had one daughter, actress Julia Louis-Dreyfus (b. January 1961) before divorcing in 1962. In 1965, he married Phyllis Blankenship; they had two daughters, both social workers: Phoebe Émilie Dominique Louis-Dreyfus Eavis (b. May 1968) and Emma R. Louis-Dreyfus (b. 16 June 1974; died on 13 August 2018). In 1996, Phoebe married English financial journalist Peter Eavis at St. Matthew's Episcopal Church in Bedford, New York. He also had a son, Raphael Penteado.

== Death ==
Louis-Dreyfus died at his home in Mount Kisco, New York on 16 September 2016 at the age of 84. His daughter Julia dedicated her 2016 Emmy win to her late father.

== See also ==
- List of billionaires
