= Julia Louis-Dreyfus =

American actress and comedian (born 1961)

- Louis-Dreyfus in 2026
- Born: January 13, 1961 (age 65); New York City, U.S.
- Occupations: Actor; comedian; producer
- Years active: 1980–present
- Spouse: Brad Hall (m. 1987)
- Children: 2, including Charlie Hall
- Father: Gérard Louis-Dreyfus
- Relatives: Lauren Bowles (half-sister); Robert Louis-Dreyfus (second cousin once removed); Kyril Louis-Dreyfus (third cousin); Pierre Louis-Dreyfus (grandfather); Charles Louis-Dreyfus (great-grandfather); Léopold Louis-Dreyfus (great-great-grandfather)
- Awards: Full list

Julia Scarlett Elizabeth Louis-Dreyfus (/ˌluːi ˈdraɪfəs/ LOO-ee DRY-fəss; born January 13, 1961) is an American actress, comedian, and producer. She is known for her roles in a string of successful comedy series and several comedy films. Louis-Dreyfus has received numerous accolades including eleven Primetime Emmy Awards, nine Actor Awards, and a Golden Globe Award.

She entered comedy as a performer with the Practical Theatre Company, and was a cast member on the sketch comedy series Saturday Night Live from 1982 to 1985. Her breakthrough came playing Elaine Benes on the NBC sitcom Seinfeld (1990–1998), one of the most successful sitcoms in television history. She earned further acclaim for her roles as Christine Campbell on The New Adventures of Old Christine (2006–2010) and Selina Meyer on Veep (2012–2019), and has guest starred on shows such as Arrested Development, Curb Your Enthusiasm, and 30 Rock.

Louis-Dreyfus has had leading film roles in the comedy-dramas Enough Said (2013), Downhill (2020), You Hurt My Feelings (2023), and Tuesday (2023), with supporting film roles in comedy films such as Hannah and Her Sisters (1986), National Lampoon's Christmas Vacation (1989), Deconstructing Harry (1997), and You People (2023). She has voiced roles in Disney animated films A Bug's Life (1998), Planes (2013), and Onward (2020) and The Sheep Detectives (2026). She has played Valentina Allegra de Fontaine in the Marvel Cinematic Universe since 2021. On stage, she made her Broadway debut in the revival of the Jon Robin Baitz play Other Desert Cities (2026).

As one of the most awarded actors in television history, she has won more Actor Awards than any other performer, and is tied with Cloris Leachman, Jean Smart, and Allison Janney for the most acting Emmys. Louis-Dreyfus has received various honors including a star on the Hollywood Walk of Fame in 2010, the Mark Twain Prize for American Humor in 2018 and the National Medal of Arts in 2021. She was inducted into the Television Academy Hall of Fame in 2014 and was named as one of Time magazine's 100 most influential people in the world in 2016.

== Early life ==
Julia Scarlett Elizabeth Louis-Dreyfus was born in New York City on January 13, 1961. Her mother, Judith (née LeFever), is an American writer and special needs educator. Her father, Gérard Louis-Dreyfus, was a French billionaire who served as chairman of the Louis Dreyfus Company. Her paternal grandfather, Pierre Louis-Dreyfus, was president of the Louis Dreyfus Group commodities and shipping conglomerate. He came from a family of Alsatian Jews, and served as a cavalry officer and member of the French Resistance during World War II. Louis-Dreyfus is a great-great-granddaughter of French businessman Léopold Louis-Dreyfus, founder of the Louis Dreyfus Group, which members of her family still control. She is a fifth cousin four times removed of Alfred Dreyfus of the Dreyfus affair. Robert Louis-Dreyfus (1946–2009), her father's second cousin, was the CEO of Adidas and owner of the soccer team Olympique de Marseille. Julia's paternal grandmother was born in America to a Brazilian father and a Mexican mother.

In 1962, a year after her birth, Louis-Dreyfus's parents divorced. She has said that she first noticed her penchant for comedy after sticking raisins up her nose at the age of three, which first made her mother laugh but then led to an emergency hospital visit. After moving to Washington, D.C., when Louis-Dreyfus was four, her mother married L. Thompson Bowles, dean of the George Washington University Medical School; Louis-Dreyfus has a half-sister, Lauren Bowles, also an actress. Due to her stepfather's work with Project HOPE, she spent her childhood in several U.S. states and countries such as Colombia, Sri Lanka, and Tunisia. In 1979, she graduated from the all-girls Holton-Arms School in Bethesda, Maryland. She later said of the school, "There were things I did in school that, had there been boys in the classroom, I would have been less motivated to do. For instance, I was president of the honor society."

Louis-Dreyfus attended Northwestern University in Evanston, Illinois in 1979, where she was a member of the Delta Gamma sorority. She studied theatre and performed in the Mee-Ow Show, a student-run improv and sketch comedy revue, before dropping out during her junior year to take a job at Saturday Night Live. In 2007, she received an honorary doctor of arts degree from Northwestern University.

== Career ==
=== 1980s: Early career and Saturday Night Live ===
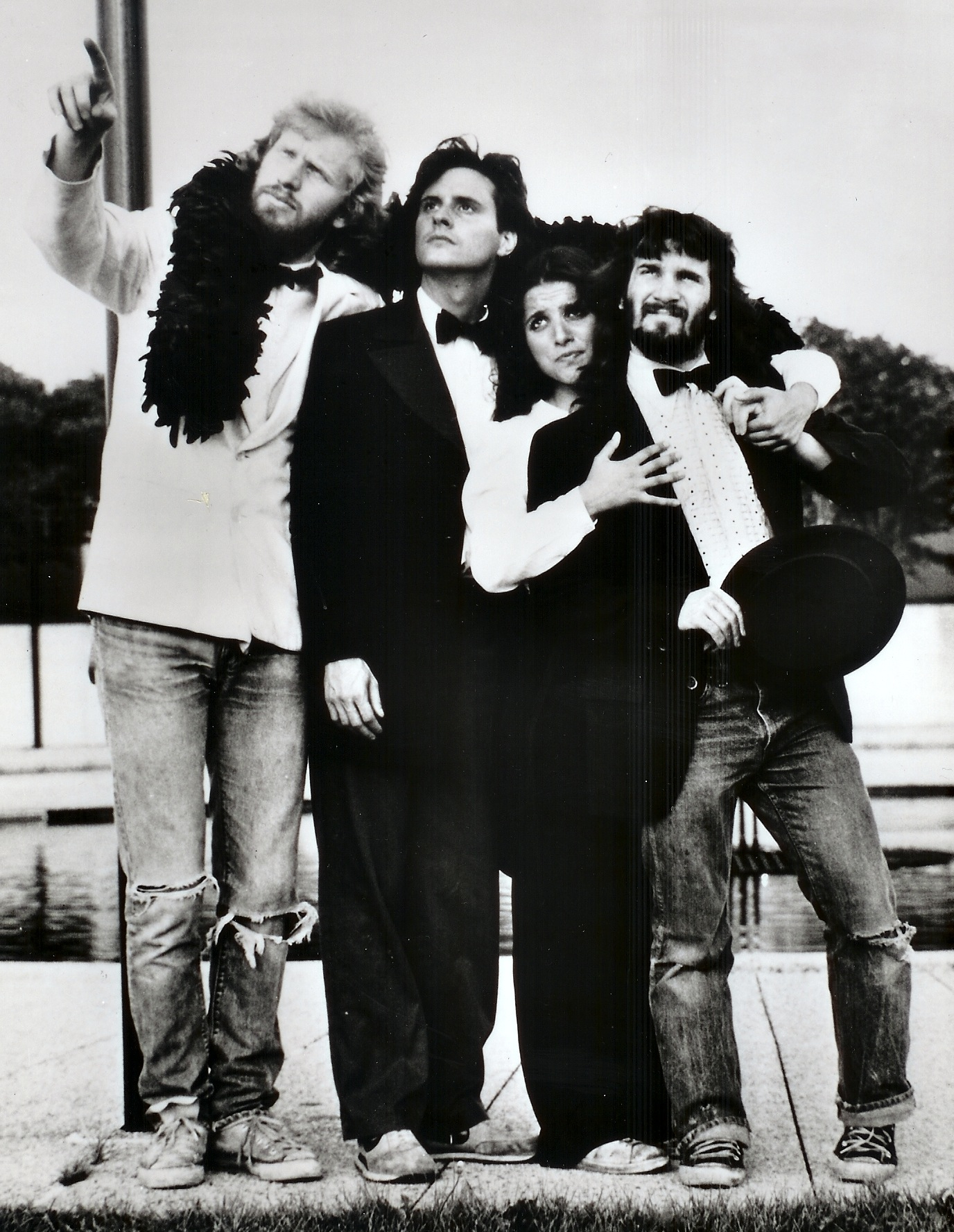
Louis-Dreyfus as a part of The Practical Theatre Company's "Golden 50th Anniversary Jubilee" in 1982, alongside castmates Brad Hall, Gary Kroeger and Paul Barrosse

As part of her comedic training, Louis-Dreyfus appeared in The Second City, one of the best-known improvisational theatre groups. It was her performance with The Practical Theatre Company at their "Golden 50th Anniversary Jubilee" that led to her being asked to join the cast of NBC's Saturday Night Live at the age of 21.

Louis-Dreyfus subsequently became a cast member on Saturday Night Live from 1982 to 1985, the youngest female cast member in the history of the program at that time. It was during her third and final year on SNL that she met writer Larry David during his only year on the show. David later co-created Seinfeld. Louis-Dreyfus has commented that her casting on SNL was a "Cinderella-getting-to-go-to-the-ball kind of experience"; however, she has also admitted that at times it was often quite tense, stating that she "didn't know how to navigate the waters of show business in general and specifically doing a live sketch-comedy show".

Recurring characters on Saturday Night Live

- April May June, a televangelist
- Becky, El Dorko's (Gary Kroeger) date
- Consuela, Chi Chi's friend and co-host of Let's Watch TV
- Darla in SNL's parody of The Little Rascals
- Weather Woman, a superhero who controls the weather
- Patti Lynn Hunnsucker, a teenage correspondent on Weekend Update

Following her 1985 departure from SNL, Louis-Dreyfus appeared in several films, including Hannah and Her Sisters (1986) by Woody Allen, Soul Man (1986), and National Lampoon's Christmas Vacation (1989), in which she starred alongside fellow SNL alumnus Chevy Chase. In 1987, Louis-Dreyfus appeared in the NBC sitcom pilot The Art of Being Nick, an intended spin-off from Family Ties starring Scott Valentine. When the pilot did not make it to series, Louis-Dreyfus was retained by producer Gary David Goldberg for a role on his new sitcom Day by Day, as the sarcastic and materialistic neighbor, Eileen Swift. Premiering in early 1988, Day by Day aired for two seasons on NBC before being cancelled.

=== 1990s: Seinfeld and widespread recognition ===
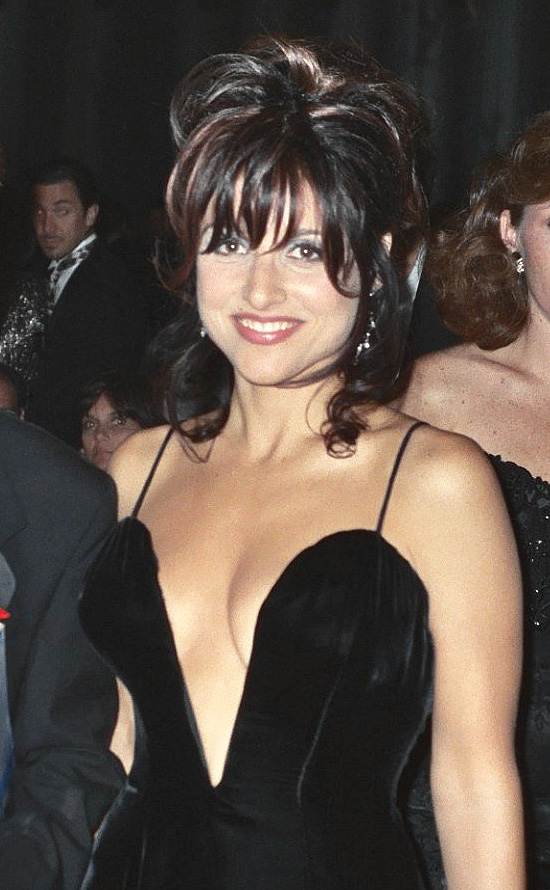
Louis-Dreyfus at the 47th Emmy Awards ceremony in September 1995

In the early 1990s, Louis-Dreyfus became famous for the role of Elaine Benes on NBC's Seinfeld. She played the role for nine seasons, appearing in all but three episodes. One of the episodes that she did not appear in was the pilot episode, "The Seinfeld Chronicles", because her character was not initially intended to be a part of the series. It was only after the first episode that NBC executives felt the show was too male-centric and demanded that creators Larry David and Jerry Seinfeld add a woman to the cast. It was revealed in the commentary on the DVD package that the addition of a female character was the condition for commissioning the show. Louis-Dreyfus won the role over several other actresses who also eventually enjoyed TV success, including Patricia Heaton and Megan Mullally. On the "Notes About Nothing" featurette on the DVD package, Seinfeld says that Louis-Dreyfus's ability to eat a peanut M&M without breaking the peanut described her: "She cracks you up without breaking your nuts."

Louis-Dreyfus received critical acclaim for her performance on the series and was a frequent recipient and nominee at television award ceremonies throughout the 1990s. Her performance earned her two Golden Globe Award nominations, winning once in 1994, nine Actor Award nominations, winning one in 1995 and two in both 1997 and 1998, and seven American Comedy Awards, winning five times in 1993, 1994, 1995, 1997 and 1998. In 1996, she won the Primetime Emmy Award for Outstanding Supporting Actress in a Comedy Series, an award she was nominated for on seven occasions from 1992 to 1998. After receiving the award, Louis-Dreyfus said the win was a "shocker", and that after being in both positions, it was "much better to win than to lose."

In 1998, Jerry Seinfeld decided to end the series after nine seasons. The series finale aired on May 14 and was one of the most-watched TV events in history, with over 76 million viewers tuning in. During her time on Seinfeld, she appeared in several films, including the comedy films Fathers' Day (1997), opposite Robin Williams and Billy Crystal, and Woody Allen's Deconstructing Harry (1997). Following a voice role in the highly successful Pixar film A Bug's Life (1998), Louis-Dreyfus lent her voice as Snake's girlfriend Gloria in The Simpsons episode "A Hunka Hunka Burns in Love".

=== 2000s: Post-Seinfeld and The New Adventures of Old Christine ===
In 2001, she made several special guest appearances on Seinfeld co-creator Larry David's show Curb Your Enthusiasm, playing herself fictionally trying to break the "curse" by planning to star in a show in which she would play an actress affected by a Seinfeld-like curse.

After several years away from a regular TV job, Louis-Dreyfus began a new single-camera sitcom, Watching Ellie, which premiered on NBC in February 2002. The series was created by husband Brad Hall and co-starred Steve Carell and Louis-Dreyfus's half-sister Lauren Bowles. The initial premise of the show was to present viewers with a "slice of life" from the goings-on and happenings of the life of Ellie Riggs, a Southern California jazz singer. The first season included a 22-minute countdown kept digitally in the lower left-hand corner of the screen, which many critics panned, claiming it was useless and "did nothing for the show." Overall, the show received mixed reviews but debuted strongly with over 16 million viewers tuning in for the series premiere, and maintained an average audience of about 10 million viewers per week.

When the series returned for a second season in the spring of 2003, it suffered a decline in viewership, averaging around eight million viewers per week. The show had undergone a drastic stylistic change between the production of seasons one and two. The first season was filmed in the single-camera format, but the second season was presented as a traditional multicamera sitcom filmed in front of a live studio audience. With dwindling viewership and failing to retain the numbers from its Frasier lead-in, the series was cancelled by NBC in May 2003.

Following NBC's cancellation of Watching Ellie, the media began circulating rumors of a so-called "Seinfeld curse", which claimed that none of the former Seinfeld actors could ever achieve success again in the television industry. Louis-Dreyfus dismissed the rumor as "a made-up thing by the media", while Seinfeld co-creator Larry David asserted that the curse was "completely idiotic." Louis-Dreyfus was interested in the role of Susan Mayer on Desperate Housewives, the role that ultimately went to Teri Hatcher. Instead, Louis-Dreyfus scored a recurring guest role as Maggie Lizer, the deceitful prosecutor and love interest of Michael Bluth on the Emmy-winning comedy Arrested Development, from 2004 to 2005.

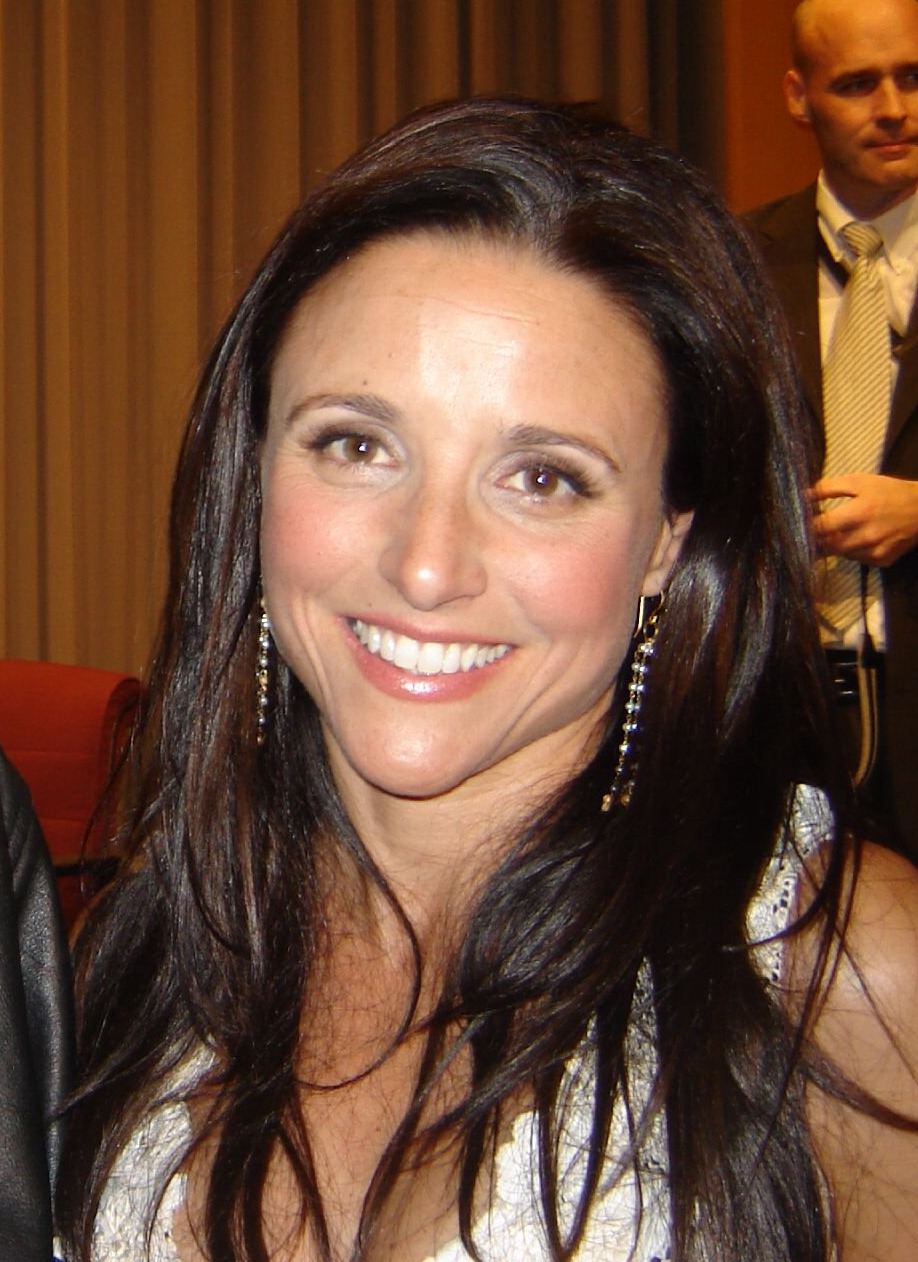
Louis-Dreyfus representing her role from The New Adventures of Old Christine at the Museum of Television & Radio in April 2007

In 2005, Louis-Dreyfus was cast in the title role of a new CBS sitcom, The New Adventures of Old Christine. The series and its concept were created by writer and producer of Will & Grace, Kari Lizer. The series told the story of Christine Campbell, a single mother who manages to maintain a fantastic relationship with her ex-husband while running a women's gym. The series debuted on CBS in March 2006 to an audience of 15 million and was initially a ratings winner for the network.

Louis-Dreyfus received considerable critical acclaim for her performance on the show, with Brian Lowry of Variety stating that Louis-Dreyfus broke the so-called "Seinfeld curse [...] with one of the best conventional half-hours to come along in a while." Alessandra Stanley from The New York Times asserted that Louis-Dreyfus's performance on the series proved she is "one of the funniest women on network television." Louis-Dreyfus also earned the 2006 Primetime Emmy Award for Outstanding Lead Actress in a Comedy Series for her performance in the first season. Referring to the curse, she stated in her acceptance speech, "I'm not somebody who really believes in curses, but curse this, baby!" Throughout the course of the series, she received five consecutive Emmy Award nominations, three consecutive Satellite Award nominations, two Actor Award nominations, and a nomination for a Golden Globe Award. In 2007, she also received two nominations for a People's Choice Award due to her return to popularity, thanks to the success of Old Christine.

In May 2006, Louis-Dreyfus hosted an episode of Saturday Night Live, becoming the first female former cast member to return to the show as a host. In the episode, she appeared with her Seinfeld co-stars Jason Alexander and Jerry Seinfeld in her opening monologue, parodying the so-called "Seinfeld curse". After a successful reception of her 2006 episode, Louis-Dreyfus again hosted SNL on March 17, 2007, and April 17, 2016. Louis-Dreyfus reprised her role as Gloria in two Simpsons episodes: 2007's "I Don't Wanna Know Why the Caged Bird Sings" and 2008's "Sex, Pies and Idiot Scrapes". In the fall of 2009, she appeared with the rest of the cast of Seinfeld in four episodes of the seventh season of Larry David's sitcom Curb Your Enthusiasm. The reunion shows received much media attention, and the episode received strong ratings for the series.

In 2009, Louis-Dreyfus was granted the honorary award for Legacy of Laughter at the TV Land Awards. Previous winners had included Lucille Ball and Mike Myers. She was presented with the award by friend Amy Poehler. The following year, Louis-Dreyfus received the 2,407th star on the Hollywood Walk of Fame on May 4, 2010, for her remarkable contribution to the broadcast television industry as both an actress and a comedian. Originally, the star was set with Louis-Dreyfus's name spelled incorrectly. It was missing both the 'o' and the hyphen in her last name. The star was corrected and the misspelled portion was removed and presented to her. Celebrity guests at the event included past and current colleagues from throughout her career, including Clark Gregg, Larry David, Eric McCormack, and Jason Alexander.

=== 2010s: Veep and acclaim ===
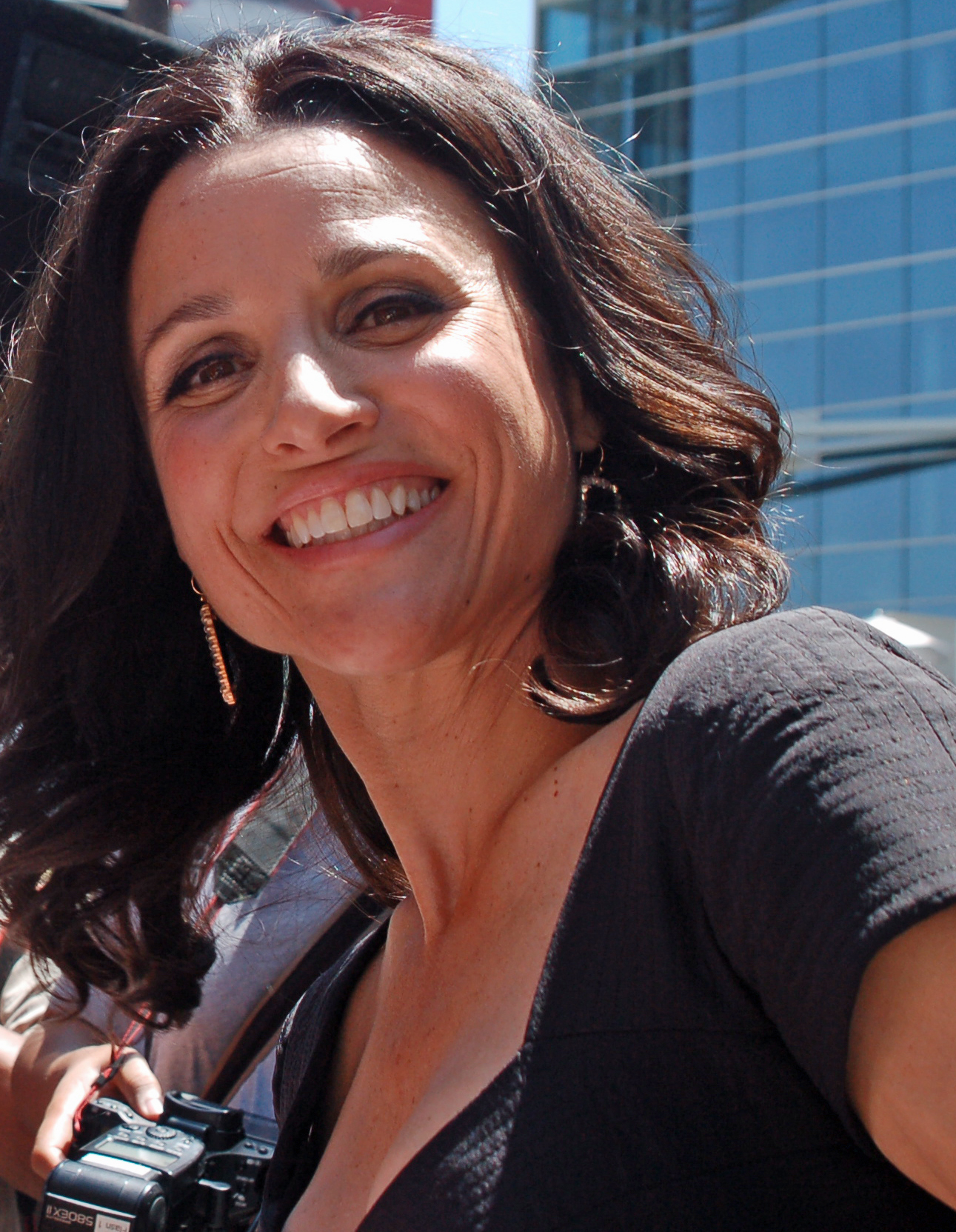
Louis-Dreyfus at the unveiling of her star on the Hollywood Walk of Fame in May 2010

Old Christine was cancelled by CBS on May 18, 2010, after five years. Discussions were held with ABC to revive the show but the show was never revived. In the spring of 2010, Louis-Dreyfus guest-starred several times in the third season of the web series Web Therapy, starring Lisa Kudrow. Louis-Dreyfus played the sister of the main character, Fiona Wallice, who gives her therapy online. When the series made the transition to cable television on the Showtime network, Louis-Dreyfus's appearance from the web series was included in the second season, airing in July 2012. In fall 2010, Louis-Dreyfus made a guest appearance on the live episode of 30 Rock, playing Tina Fey's role of Liz Lemon in the cutaway shots. Louis-Dreyfus was among several Saturday Night Live alumni appearing in the episode, including Rachel Dratch, Bill Hader, and regulars Tracy Morgan and Fey herself. Louis-Dreyfus also starred in a "Women of SNL" special on November 1, 2010, on NBC.

In May and June 2011, Louis-Dreyfus teamed up with husband Brad Hall for her first short film, Picture Paris. This was the first time the couple had collaborated since their early-2000s NBC comedy Watching Ellie. Hall wrote and directed the film, while Louis-Dreyfus played the lead role of an ordinary woman with an extraordinary obsession with the city of Paris. The film premiered on January 29, 2012, at the Santa Barbara International Film Festival, and has received considerable critical acclaim. It made its television premiere on HBO on December 17, 2012.

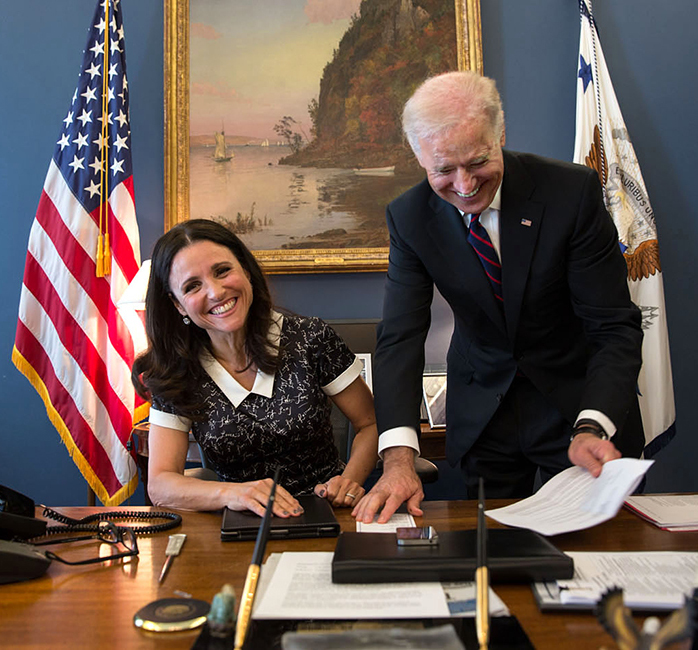
Louis-Dreyfus with then Vice President Joe Biden in April 2013

In early 2011, HBO confirmed that Louis-Dreyfus had been cast in the lead role of U.S. Vice President Selina Meyer in a new satirical comedy series titled Veep. The series was commissioned for a first season of eight episodes. In addition to her starring role, Louis-Dreyfus would also be a producer. In preparation for her role, Louis-Dreyfus spoke with Al Gore and another former vice president, senators, speechwriters, chiefs of staffs of various offices, and schedulers. Louis-Dreyfus commended HBO for allowing the cast and crew to engage in a "protracted pre-production process", which included a six-week rehearsal period before filming began.

The first season was filmed in the fall of 2011, in Baltimore, and the series premiered on April 22, 2012. The premiere episode was met with high praise from critics, particularly for Louis-Dreyfus's performance. The Hollywood Reporter asserted the character of Selina Meyer was her "best post-Seinfeld role" to date and claimed she gives "an Emmy-worthy effort", while the Los Angeles Times contended the series demonstrates she is "one of the medium's great comediennes." Following the success of the first season, Louis-Dreyfus was named by the Huffington Post as one of the funniest people of 2012, asserting that she is the "most magnetic and naturally funny woman on TV since Mary Tyler Moore."

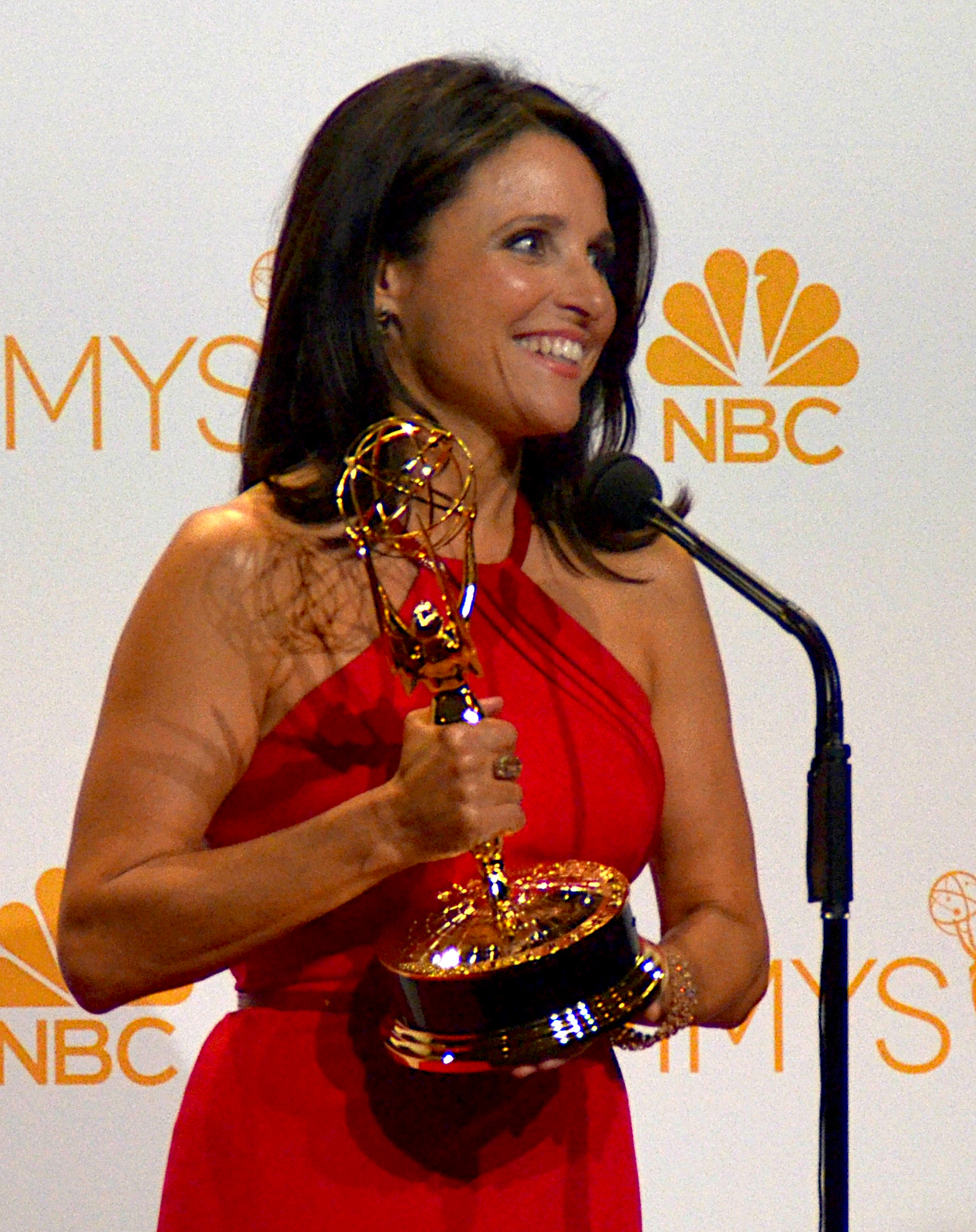
Louis-Dreyfus after receiving her third Primetime Emmy Award for Outstanding Lead Actress in a Comedy Series for Veep in August 2014

For her performance on Veep, Louis-Dreyfus received several accolades, most notably seven nominations for the Primetime Emmy Awards for Outstanding Lead Actress in a Comedy Series between 2012 and 2019, winning the award six times. These Emmy wins for Veep, following previous wins for Seinfeld and The New Adventures of Old Christine, resulted in her becoming the only woman to win an acting award for three separate comedy series. Her sixth win in 2016 surpassed the record previously held by Mary Tyler Moore and Candice Bergen for the most wins in that category. In 2017, her sixth consecutive win, and eighth acting win, overall made her the performer with the most Emmys for the same role in the same series, surpassing Candice Bergen and Don Knotts, and put her in a tie with Cloris Leachman for the most Emmys ever won by a performer. She was also nominated as one of the producers for Veep in the Primetime Emmy Award for Outstanding Comedy Series category for all seven seasons, winning the award in 2015, 2016 and 2017 for the fourth, fifth and sixth seasons respectively. Louis-Dreyfus also received five Critics' Choice Television Award nominations, winning twice in 2013 and 2014, ten Actor Award nominations, winning twice in 2014 and 2017, and five Television Critics Association Award nominations, winning once in 2014. Her performance additionally garnered her five Satellite Award nominations and five consecutive Golden Globe Award nominations.

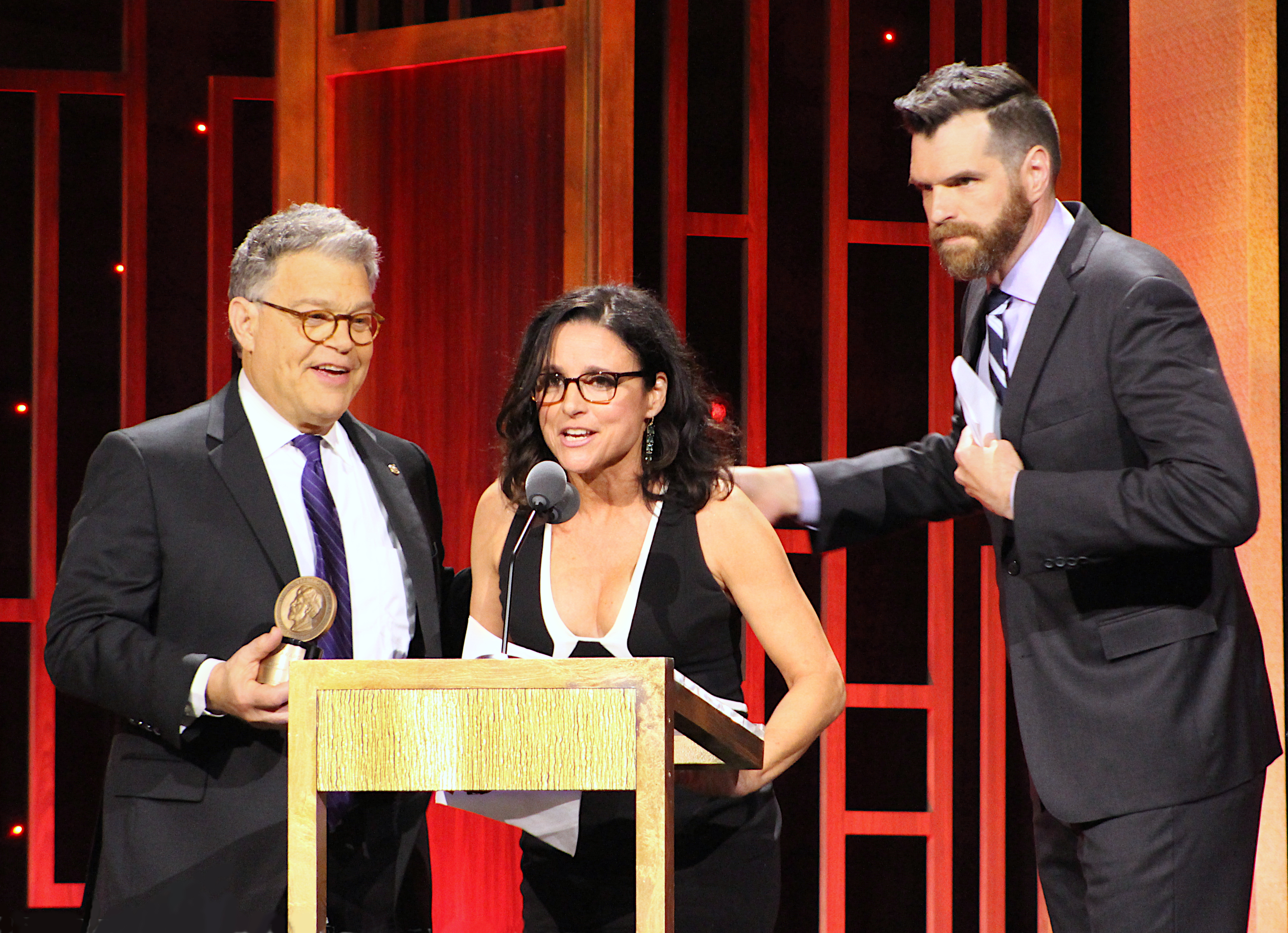
Louis-Dreyfus with her colleague Timothy Simons accepting the Peabody Award for Veep from Al Franken in May 2017

Louis-Dreyfus lent her voice to the 2013 animated film Planes, in the role of Rochelle. To date, the film has grossed well over $200 million at the box office worldwide. She also starred in the film Enough Said, directed by Nicole Holofcener, which was released on September 18, 2013. This marked her debut as a lead actress in a full-length feature film. The film garnered rave reviews from film critics, ranking among the best-reviewed films of 2013. The website Rotten Tomatoes gives the film a score of 96% based on 152 reviews, many of them praising Louis-Dreyfus's performance. She received several Best Actress nominations including for the Golden Globe Awards and the Critics' Choice Movie Awards. Another review aggregation website, Metacritic, gave the film a score of 78 out of 100, based on 44 critics, signifying "generally favorable reviews".

Since December 2014, Louis-Dreyfus has appeared in a series of television commercials for Old Navy. In 2015 she acted in the Comedy Central sketch series Inside Amy Schumer alongside Tina Fey and Patricia Arquette, playing a version of themselves giving advice on aging to Amy Schumer. Dreyfus said of the experience "I started to feel unbelievably paranoid that I was making fun of myself and wondering, was this really happening to me? Like, how meta is this moment in my life? I started to have a kind of soul-searching crisis in the middle of the day. And I didn't know [the other women] well enough to bring it up, so I was just trying to be a good sport even though I was dying a little bit on the inside." On April 16, 2016, she returned to Saturday Night Live serving as host for the third time with musical guest Nick Jonas. During the episode's cold open, she reprised her role of Elaine Benes from Seinfeld.

=== 2020s: Professional expansion ===
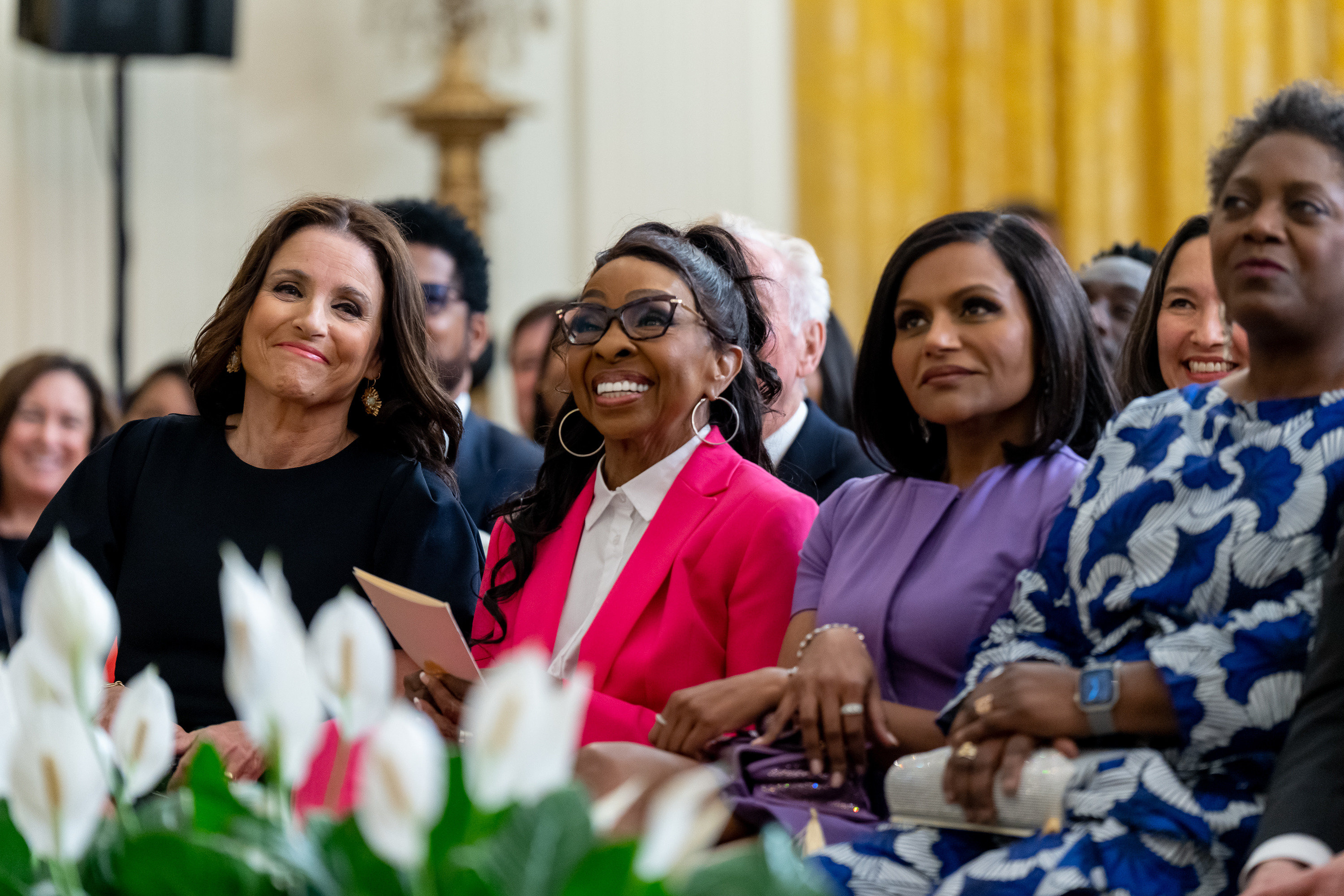
Louis-Dreyfus with Gladys Knight and Mindy Kaling in the White House in March 2023.

In 2020, Louis-Dreyfus headlined the comedy-drama Downhill, opposite Will Ferrell. The film premiered at the 2020 Sundance Film Festival and was theatrically released on February 14. Next, she voiced a suburban elf mother, Laurel Lightfoot, in Pixar's Onward opposite Tom Holland and Chris Pratt. The film was released on March 6, 2020. In January 2020, Louis-Dreyfus signed a multi-year deal with Apple TV+. Under the deal, she will develop new projects for Apple TV+ as both an executive producer and star. The following year Louis-Dreyfus appeared in the Disney+ series The Falcon and the Winter Soldier (2021) as Valentina Allegra de Fontaine, which is set in the Marvel Cinematic Universe, though she was originally intended to debut in the film Black Widow (where she appears in the post credit scene). She reprised the role in Black Panther: Wakanda Forever (2022), and also appears in the film Thunderbolts* (2025).

In 2022 she was a guest on the Netflix show My Next Guest Needs No Introduction with David Letterman. In 2023 she reunited with Nicole Holofcener starring in the A24 independent comedy film You Hurt My Feelings. Dreyfus produced the film and acted alongside Tobias Menzies, Michaela Watkins, Arian Moayed and Jeannie Berlin. The film premiered at the Sundance Film Festival to positive reviews. Peter Bradshaw praised her performance writing, "Louis-Dreyfus is such a superb comic performer that it is interesting seeing her take on something low-key". That same year she portrayed a liberal Jewish mother in the Netflix romantic comedy You People (2023). She also starred in the A24 film Tuesday, directed by Daina Oniunas-Pusić, which premiered at the 2023 Telluride Film Festival. Sheri Linden of The Hollywood Reporter praised Dreyfus writing, "[She] delves into a sphere of emotion that she’s never before explored onscreen. She gives us not just the psychology but the feelings of fear, loss and resilience". She added "She’s a performer whose radiant ferocity has never been in doubt, but until now we haven’t seen all sides of the prism."

In 2023, Louis-Dreyfus became host of the podcast Wiser Than Me. On the show, she interviews women older than her on their lived experience and earned wisdom. Guests have included Jane Fonda, Carol Burnett, Isabel Allende and Amy Tan. The show, produced by Lemonada Media, was named Apple's Best Podcast of the Year in 2023. Among her season two guests, Louis-Dreyfus interviews Billie Jean King, Patti Smith, and Julie Andrews. In 2024, Apple announced that Wiser Than Me was the 3rd most shared show in the United States on Apple Podcasts in 2024. In 2026, she voiced roles in The Sheep Detectives and Tangles. That same year, it was announced that she would make her Broadway debut in the revival of the Jon Robin Baitz play Other Desert Cities at the Hudson Theater with performances starting in September 29. She will star alongside Allison Janney, Joe Keery, Lily Rabe, and Ed Harris.

== Artistry and reception ==
Louis-Dreyfus said she respects "women who are not afraid of making themselves look bad or foolish to get a laugh" and cites her acting idols as Lucille Ball, Mary Tyler Moore, Madeline Kahn, Teri Garr, Valerie Harper, and Cloris Leachman. The actress Tina Fey said that Louis-Dreyfus inspired her character Liz Lemon on the NBC comedy series 30 Rock.

Louis-Dreyfus is widely regarded as one of the finest comedic actresses of her generation. Jake Coyle of the Lubbock Avalanche-Journal said "Few comediennes have both her gift for physical comedy... and vocal precision". According to the journalist Molly Ball, Louis-Dreyfus has played mostly "funny, self-centered women who are compelling despite often being ill-behaved." Louis-Dreyfus said she had turned playing unlikeable people into a career. Ball said: "She has also left an indelible cultural mark, expanding the possibilities for women in comedy–and maybe in politics and public life as well."

== Personal life ==
Louis-Dreyfus was raised Catholic but moved towards agnosticism; she said she had no "traditional religious affiliation".

=== Marriage and family ===
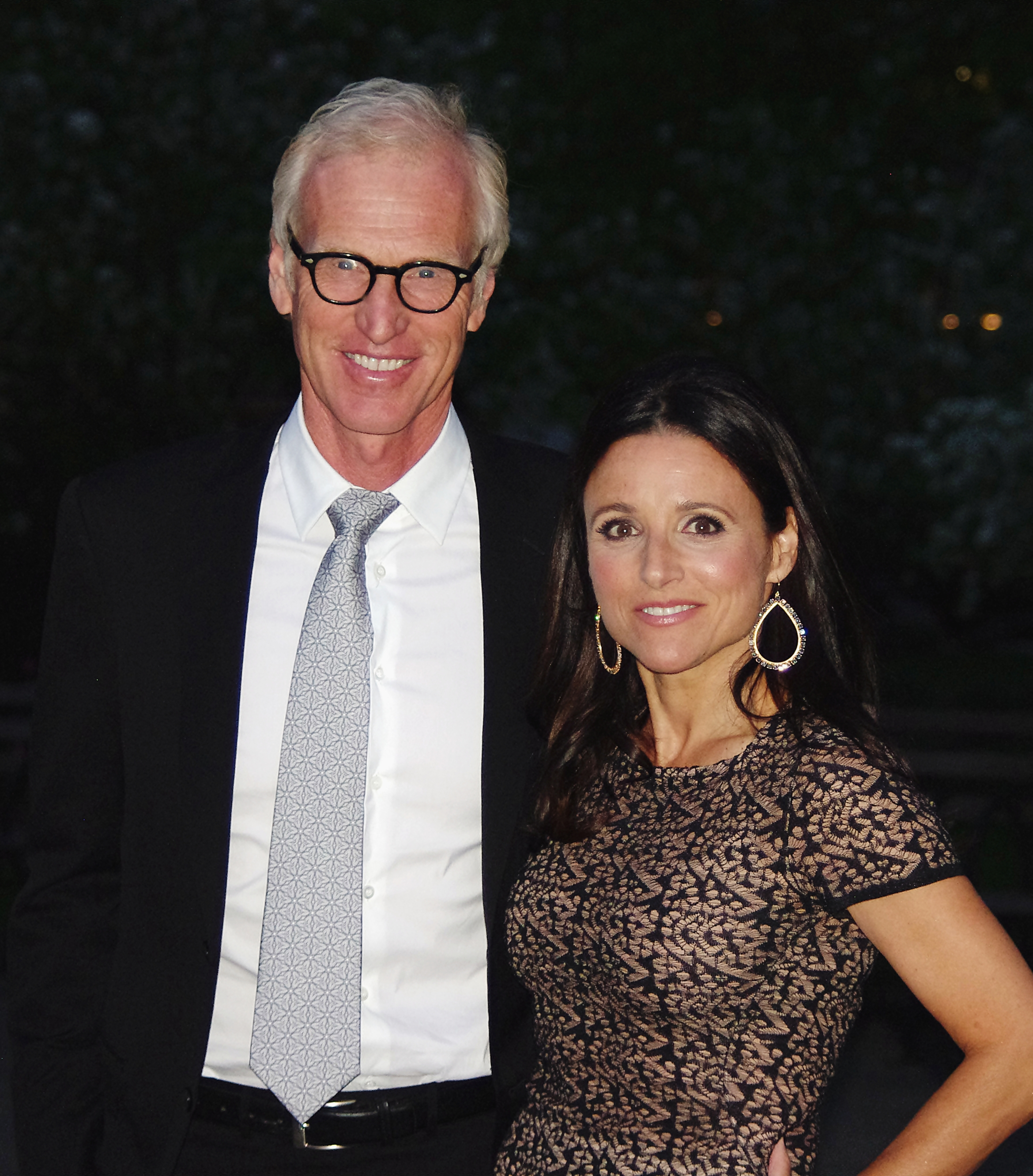
Louis-Dreyfus and her husband Brad Hall at the 2012 Tribeca Film Festival

Louis-Dreyfus's maternal half-sister, Lauren Bowles, is also an actress. She also had two paternal half-sisters, Phoebe and Emma. Emma died in August 2018.

While at Northwestern University, Louis-Dreyfus met her future husband, the Saturday Night Live comedian Brad Hall. They married in 1987 and have two sons. Their older son, Henry Hall, is a singer-songwriter who has performed on The Tonight Show, and an actor. Their younger son, Charlie Hall, is an actor. Her first pregnancy ended in a miscarriage.

She and Hall lost their Pacific Palisades house, which they purchased in the 1990s, in the 2025 Palisades Fire.

=== Health ===
On September 28, 2017, Louis-Dreyfus announced that she had been diagnosed with breast cancer, which she discovered the day after winning a Primetime Emmy Award for Outstanding Lead Actress in a Comedy Series for her role in Veep. She said: "One in eight women get breast cancer. Today, I'm the one. The good news is that I have the most glorious group of supportive and caring family and friends, and fantastic insurance through my union. The bad news is that not all women are so lucky, so let's fight all cancers and make universal healthcare a reality." On October 18, 2018, she announced on an episode of Jimmy Kimmel Live! that she was cancer-free.

=== Activism and politics ===
Louis-Dreyfus supported Al Gore's 2000 U.S. presidential bid and Barack Obama's bid for the presidency in both 2008 and 2012. She appeared in a video that urged Obama to reject the proposal of the Keystone XL pipeline, arguing that if the pipeline ever were to leak, it would cause massive pollution across the U.S. She has voiced her concern for several environmental issues and has raised millions for Heal the Bay, the Natural Resources Defense Council, and the Trust for Public Land. She also worked for the successful passage of Proposition O, which allocated $500 million for cleaning up the Los Angeles water supply.

In October 2010, before the U.S. Senate election in California, Louis-Dreyfus starred in a humorous Barbara Boxer ad regarding energy policy. During the 2016 Democratic National Convention, she supported Hillary Clinton in that year's presidential election. In her acceptance speech at the 2017 Screen Actors Guild Awards, she denounced President Donald Trump's executive order, referred to as the "Muslim ban", as "un-American" and said, "My father fled religious persecution in Nazi-occupied France."

Louis-Dreyfus emceed the final night of the 2020 Democratic National Convention, endorsing Joe Biden. She has also published information regarding voting by mail and urged all Americans to vote. Louis-Dreyfus endorsed Representative Karen Bass in the 2022 Los Angeles mayoral election, in various social media posts. In 2024, she supported Vice President Kamala Harris for president in the general election.

== Acting credits ==
Key
†	Denotes films that have not yet been released

=== Film ===
Year	Title	Role	Notes
1986	Troll	Jeanette Cooper	
1986	Hannah and Her Sisters	Marianna	
1986	Soul Man	Elizabeth Stimson	
1989	National Lampoon's Christmas Vacation	Margo Chester	
1993	Jack the Bear	Peggy Etinger	
1994	North	North's Mother	
1997	Fathers' Day	Caroline Lawrence	
1997	Deconstructing Harry	Leslie	
1998	A Bug's Life	Princess Atta	Voice
1999	Animal Farm	Mollie	Voice
2012	Picture Paris	Ellen Larson	
2013	Planes	Rochelle	Voice
2013	Enough Said	Evelyn	
2020	Downhill	Billie Stanton	Also producer
2020	Onward	Laurel Lightfoot	Voice
2021	Black Widow	Valentina Allegra de Fontaine	Cameo
2022	Black Panther: Wakanda Forever	Valentina Allegra de Fontaine	
2023	You People	Shelley	
2023	You Hurt My Feelings	Elizabeth	Also producer
2023	Tuesday	Zora	
2025	Thunderbolts*	Valentina Allegra de Fontaine	
2026	The Sheep Detectives	Lily	Voice
2026	Tangles	Midge	Voice; also producer

=== Television ===
Year	Title	Role	Notes
1982–1985	Saturday Night Live	Various Characters	57 episodes
1987	The Art of Being Nick	Rachel	Television special
1988	Family Ties	Susan White	Episode: "Read It and Weep: Part 2"
1988–1989	Day by Day	Eileen Swift	33 episodes
1990–1998	Seinfeld	Elaine Benes	177 episodes
1992	Dinosaurs	Heather Worthington (voice)	Episode: "Slave to Fashion"
1994	Sesame Street: 25 Wonderful Years	Katherine Lee Kathie	Television special
1995	The Single Guy	Christina	Episode: "Mugging"
1996	London Suite	Debra Dolby	Television film
1997	Hey Arnold!	Miss Felter (voice)	Episode: "Crush on Teacher"
1997	Dr. Katz, Professional Therapist	Julia (voice)	Episode: "Ben Treats"
1999	Animal Farm	Mollie (voice)	Television film
1999	Blue's Clues	Julia	Episode: "Blue's Big Pajama Party"
2000	Geppetto	The Blue Fairy	Television film
2000–2001, 2009	Curb Your Enthusiasm	Herself	8 episodes
2001–2008	The Simpsons	Gloria (voice)	3 episodes
2002–2003	Watching Ellie	Eleanor Riggs	19 episodes; also producer
2004–2005	Arrested Development	Maggie Lizer	4 episodes
2005	The Fairly OddParents	Blonda (voice)	Episode: "Blondas Have More Fun!"
2006–2010	The New Adventures of Old Christine	Christine Campbell	88 episodes; also producer in season 5
2006; 2007; 2016	Saturday Night Live	Herself / Host	Episode: "Julia Louis-Dreyfus/Paul Simon"; Episode: "Julia Louis-Dreyfus/Snow Patrol"; Episode: "Julia Louis-Dreyfus/Alicia Keys"
2010	30 Rock	Liz Lemon	Episode: "Live Show"
2012–2019	Veep	Selina Meyer	65 episodes; also executive producer
2012	Web Therapy	Shevaun Haig	Episode: "Sister Act"
2015	Inside Amy Schumer	Herself	Episode: "Last Fuckable Day"
2015	Comedians in Cars Getting Coffee	Herself	Episode: "I'll Go If I Don't Have to Talk"
2019	Archibald's Next Big Thing	Astronaut Monkey (voice)	Episode: "The Chicken Has Landed/The Night of the Nibbler"
2021	The Falcon and the Winter Soldier	Valentina Allegra de Fontaine	2 episodes
2021	Marvel Studios: Assembled	Herself	Documentary; Episode: "The Making of The Falcon and the Winter Soldier"
2022	My Next Guest Needs No Introduction with David Letterman	Herself	Episode: "Julia Louis-Dreyfus"
2023	HouseBroken	Boaracle (voice)	Episode: "Who Ain't Afraid of No Ghosts?"
2025	SNL50: The Anniversary Special	Herself	Television special

=== Theater ===
Year	Title	Role	Playwright	Venue	Ref.
2026	Other Desert Cities	Polly Wyeth	Jon Robin Baitz	Hudson Theater, Broadway	

== Awards and nominations ==
Julia Louis-Dreyfus has won the Primetime Emmy Award for Outstanding Lead Actress in a Comedy Series seven times: once for her role on The New Adventures of Old Christine (2006) and six consecutive awards for playing Selina Meyer on Veep (2012–17), as well as Outstanding Supporting Actress in a Comedy Series once for Seinfeld (1996).

As of 2026, she holds the record for the most Primetime Emmy awards as an actor for the same role and is tied with Allison Janney, fellow Northwestern University alum Cloris Leachman, and Jean Smart for the most acting Primetime Emmy awards (with eight). She has also been nominated for nine Golden Globe Awards, winning one for Best Supporting Actress in a Series, Miniseries, or Television Film for her role as Elaine Benes on Seinfeld (1995).

She has also been nominated for twenty-one Actor Awards and has won five for individual performance (nine altogether) for her work on Seinfeld (1997–98) and Veep (2014, 2017–18). In 2016, she won the Crossover Talent award at the 4th Annual American Reality Television Awards.

In 2018, she was the twentieth recipient of the Mark Twain Prize for American Humor.

In 2023, the podcast she hosts, Wiser Than Me, won Apple's Best Podcast of the Year.
