= Banque Louis-Dreyfus =

Former French bank

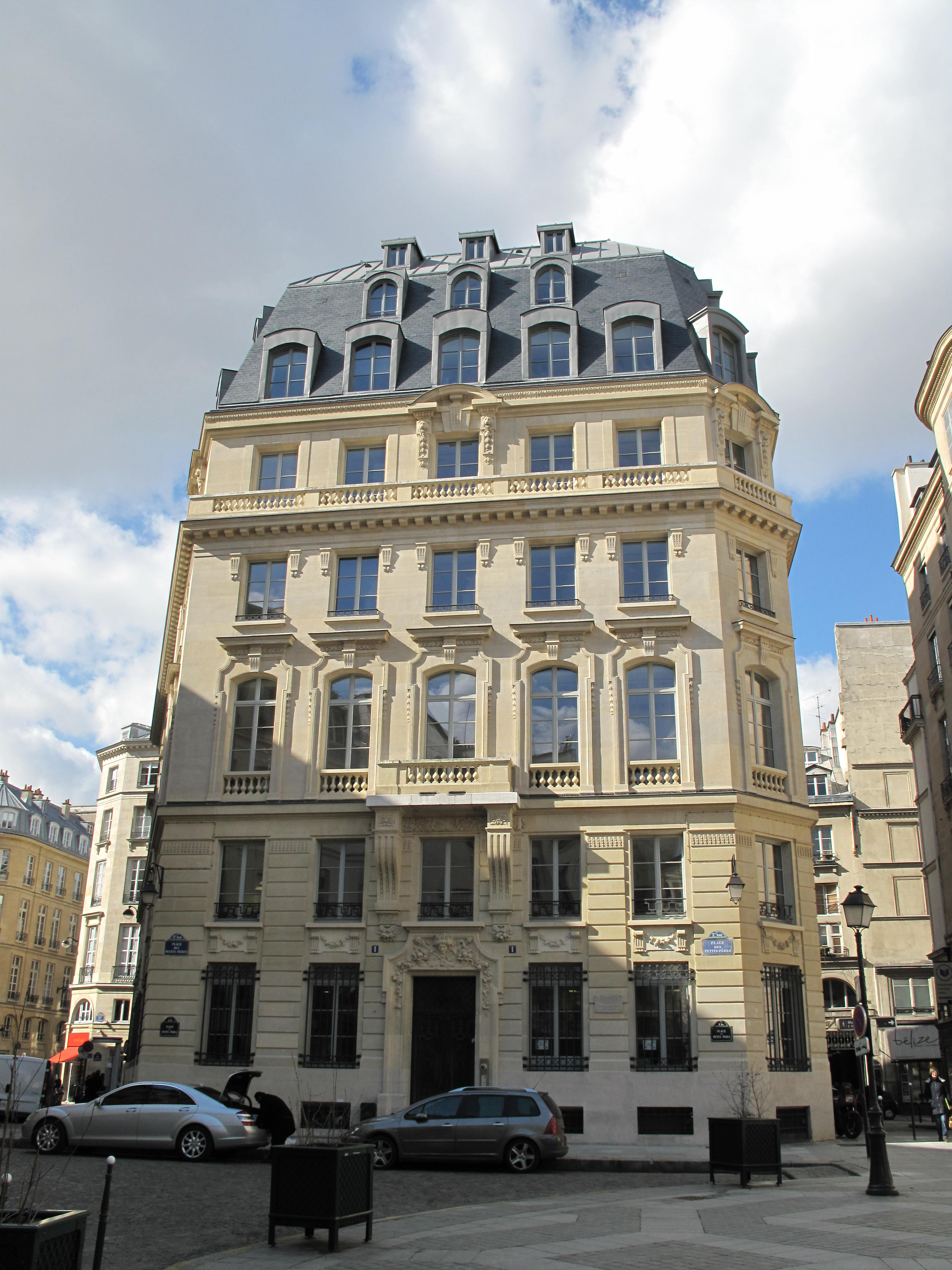
Former head office on Place des Petits-Pères in Paris

The Banque Louis-Dreyfus was a bank based in Paris, France. It was created in 1905 by commodities trader and financier Léopold Louis-Dreyfus, and eventually purchased in two stages in 1978 and 1989 by Bank Brussels Lambert (BBL), later part of ING.

== Overview ==
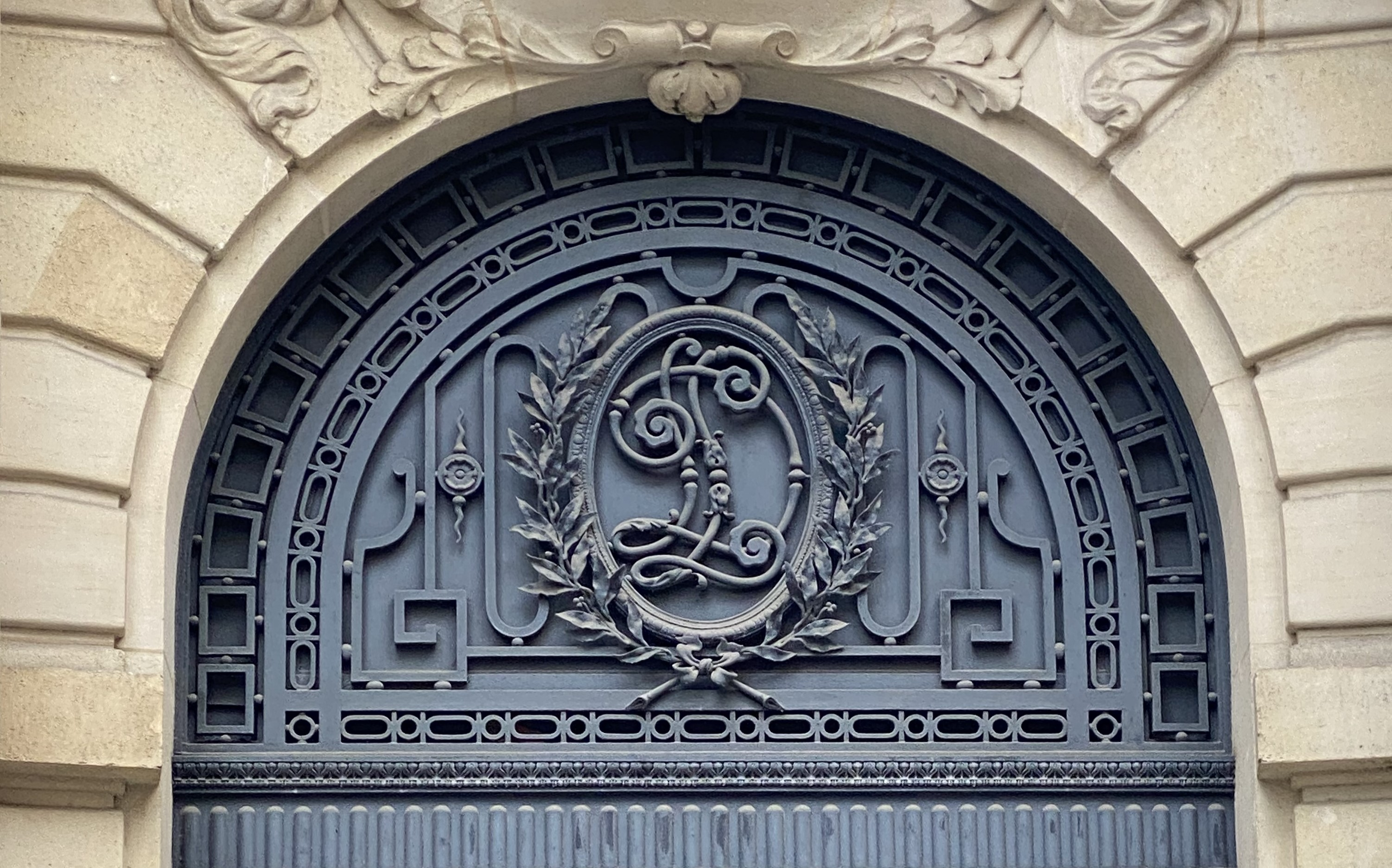
LD (for Louis Dreyfus) ironwork monogram above the secondary entrance to the former head office at 4, rue de la Banque

Léopold Louis-Dreyfus founded the bank to facilitate financing of the activities of his family-held Louis Dreyfus Company, founded in 1850 and based in Paris since 1875, and particularly its creation of a fleet of commercial ships, an activity he had started in 1900. Also in 1905, Louis-Dreyfus commissioned a new headquarters for the bank from prominent architect Henri Paul Nénot.

Following the Battle of France, the firm's assets in France were sequestered by the Vichy regime. From 1941 to 1944, the bank's building became the seat of the regime's Commissariat-General for Jewish Affairs.

The bank's activities restarted after France's liberation and were registered as an investment bank under French law in 1954. In 1967, the bank transformed itself from a partnership (French: société en nom collectif) into a joint-stock company (French: société anonyme). At the time, it was France's tenth-largest investment bank by assets, ahead of the Banque Rothschild.

in 1974, the Louis-Dreyfus group, including the bank, relocated form central Paris to a modern building at 87, avenue de la Grande-Armée on Porte Maillot, designed by architect Pierre Dufau and nicknamed the "blue diamond" (French: le diamant bleu) for its then-unusual blue-tinted curtain walls.

In 1978, BBL acquired slightly over 50 percent of Banque Louis-Dreyfus, then full ownership in 1989. The Louis-Dreyfus Company created another bank, branded LD Finance, in 1994, but sold a controlling stake in it in 1998.

The bank's first head office on Place des Petits-Pères was later acquired by the French Ministry of Culture. The "blue diamond" in turn was renovated with green-tinted glass cladding instead of Dufau's original blue.

== See also ==
- Banque Lambert
- List of banks in France
