= Maximum Pleasure Guaranteed =

2026 American television series

- Genre: Comedy thriller; Crime
- Created by: David J. Rosen
- Starring: Tatiana Maslany; Jake Johnson; Jessy Hodges; Jon Michael Hill; Charlie Hall; Kiarra Hamagami Goldberg; Nola Wallace; Dolly de Leon
- Music by: Wynne Bennett
- Country of origin: United States
- Original language: English
- No. of seasons: 1
- No. of episodes: 10

Production
- Executive producers: David J. Rosen; Simon Kinberg; Audrey Chon; Bard Dorros; David Gordon Green; Tony Hernandez; Lilly Burns; Elise Henderson
- Producer: Jason Sokoloff
- Cinematography: Joe Anderson; Mark Schwartzbard
- Editors: Skip Macdonald; Jeff Seibenick; Alex Minnick
- Running time: 28–40 minutes
- Production companies: MOS; Counterpart Studios; Anonymous Content; Kinberg Genre; Apple Studios

Original release
- Network: Apple TV
- Release: May 20, 2026 – present

Maximum Pleasure Guaranteed is an American comedy thriller crime television series created by David J. Rosen, starring Tatiana Maslany as a divorced fact checker who falls into a web of murder, blackmail, and youth soccer. The series premiered on Apple TV on May 20, 2026. In October 2026, the series was renewed for a second season.

== Premise ==
Paula Sanders is a divorced fact checker living in Sunnyside, Queens, in a contentious child custody dispute with her ex-husband Karl. Amidst her legal troubles, she pays for the online services of webcam model Trevor and vents to him about her personal life. One night, Trevor is beaten and kidnapped on-camera; soon, Paula is receiving calls for ransom money. Police detectives insist to Paula that this is likely an internet scam, but then Trevor is found dead. Paula is roped into the mystery of Trevor's death as secrets from her past come to light.

== Cast ==
=== Main ===
- Tatiana Maslany as Paula
- Jake Johnson as Karl, Paula's ex-husband
- Jessy Hodges as Mallory, Karl's current wife
- Jon Michael Hill as NYPD Detective Baxter
- Charlie Hall as Rudy, one of Paula's coworkers
- Kiarra Hamagami Goldberg as Geri, one of Paula's coworkers
- Nola Wallace as Hazel, Paula and Karl's daughter
- Dolly de Leon as NYPD Detective Gonzalez

=== Recurring ===
- Brandon Flynn as Trevor, a camboy
- Murray Bartlett as Dennis, Trevor's older boyfriend
- Tara Summers as Suzie Tell, Paula's superior at work
- Nina Bloomgarden as Ash, Trevor's friend
- Kapil Talwalkar as Drew, a writer for the magazine that employs Paula
- Daniel Dale as Sky, another camboy and Trevor's friend
- Remy Auberjonois as Doug, Paula's lawyer
- Grace Porter as Gwynn, a parent at Hazel's school
- Raymond Lee as Steve, a parent at Hazel's school and Paula's love interest
- Tala Ashe as Jennifer, hired assassin

== Episodes ==
No.	Title	Directed by	Written by	Original release date
1	"Magnets"	David Gordon Green	David J. Rosen	May 20, 2026
Paula is a fact checker in the midst of a messy divorce from her ex-husband Karl, which centres around the custody arrangements of their daughter Hazel. Having to leave the family home to Karl and his new girlfriend Mallory, Paula moves into an apartment and struggles with feelings of failure and lack of accomplishment. She begins paying Trevor, a cam boy, for his time, during which she vents about her life and enjoys sexual experiences with him. One night, during one of their sessions, Paula witnesses Trevor being brutally attacked in his home. Reporting it to the police, Detective Sofia Gonzalez believes it to be a scam, and states that there is not a lot she can do considering the limited information that Paula knows about Trevor. Paula then begins getting calls from Trevor stating that he is going to be killed if she does not send $15,000 to his attackers. When she eventually challenges him, Trevor blackmails her, revealing that he will destroy her life using the information she has shared with him in their sessions. Paula is able to determine where Trevor lives and, after an argument with Karl where he refuses to allow Hazel to stay with her over the holidays and incensed by continuous calls from Trevor, drives over alone to confront him. When she arrives at the house, she finds Trevor dead in a bathroom and hears someone approaching.
2	"YABA"	Dan Sackheim	David J. Rosen	May 20, 2026
In a flashback, Trevor is shown to be in a relationship with an older man, Dennis, and proposes that they buy a run-down building and convert it into student apartments to make money. Dennis later brutally murders Trevor and leaves to get tools to dispose of the body, unaware that Paula has entered the house in the meantime. Paula is able to escape from Dennis, but then gets into an argument with Karl and is chastised by her boss Suzie for her lack of commitment to her job. She later has a tense conversation with Mallory about feeling as though she and Karl are trying to take Hazel away from her. Detective Gonzalez arrives at her office to question her after Trevor's body is found by a neighbor; the detective is suspicious about why Paula didn't call the police and begins investigating her. An overwhelmed Paula confesses to her co-workers Geri and Rudy that she was scammed online. Dennis returns to Trevor's street and finds Hazel's soccer boots, which were accidentally left behind by Paula during her escape.
3	"Chunnel"	Dan Sackheim	David J. Rosen	May 27, 2026
Karl and Mallory tell Paula they are moving to Boise, Idaho, and offer to buy her a house there so she can stay near Hazel, but she declines. Detectives Gonzalez and Baxter investigate Trevor's house and theorise about what happened to him. Gonzalez calls Dennis, who is using the name "Jeff", to inform him that Trevor has died, and he pretends to be upset. Baxter then reveals to Gonzalez that this is not the first dead body that Paula has been associated with. The anonymous caller tells Paula they want $15,000 by the end of the day, but she wires them just $1 to learn their true identity. She argues with the caller, revealed to be a woman named Ash, who is not aware that Trevor is dead, and attempts to contact him after Paula reveals this. Dennis buys soccer cleats, hides trackers in the soles, and then drops them off at various schools trying to find Hazel. He follows and attacks Mallory, believing her to be Paula. Realizing his error, he steals her jewellery and leaves her in the woods.
4	"Raisins"	Damon Thomas	Tami Sagher	June 3, 2026
Two years prior, Paula and Karl are married and living in Portland, Oregon. Paula is driving home from a birthday party with Hazel, dejected that Karl spent most of the time at the event flirting with Mallory. Later, Paula calls Karl in a panic, saying she accidentally hit their neighbor Caleb with her car. Karl and Mallory arrive and help Paula cover up her culpability in Caleb's death. In the present, Dennis goes to see Gonzales and Baxter and provides an alibi that checks out. While Mallory recovers from her attack, Gonzales phones Karl and raises her suspicions about Paula. Geri and Rudy confess to Paula that they snooped on her laptop and know about Trevor, and Paula is forced to come clean about Trevor's death and escaping the scene of the crime. Dennis tracks Paula to her apartment and prepares to enter her home.
5	"Scamboy"	Damon Thomas	Miki Johnson	June 10, 2026
Before Dennis can enter Paula's home, he is called by his superior and sent on another assignment. For Karl's custody case, Mallory attempts to secure a judge that will be more sympathetic to Karl. Paula gets in contact with camboy Sky, an associate of Trevor's, and agrees to meet him with information on the murder suspect. She meets Sky at an abandoned motel, accompanied by Geri and Rudy who wait outside in a car. As Paula talks to Sky, she deduces that he is the man who pretended to kidnap Trevor. As Sky admits to being the "kidnapper" but not the killer, his girlfriend Ashley comes out of hiding and holds Paula at gunpoint. Ashley calls Dennis and gives up Paula's location at the motel in exchange for money. Ashley and Sky attempt to flee the scene before Dennis arrives, but Paula gets hold of a nail gun and nails Sky to the floor with it. She escapes with Geri and Rudy. Dennis ambushes and murders Sky at the motel; Ashley gets away. That night, Paula goes to a pawn shop and gets a gun. As she walks out of the store, she is photographed by a private investigator.
6	"Rosebuds"	Alethea Jones	Wyatt Cain	June 17, 2026
At a meeting with Karl's lawyer, the private investigator shows photos he took of Paula to Karl and Mallory. The photos include Dennis in Paula's apartment alone, whom the investigator mistakes as a new boyfriend. Karl angrily confronts Paula at a party she is hosting for Hazel's soccer team, questioning why she would give a key to "her new boyfriend." Paula realizes Dennis has been inside her home without her knowledge. Dennis murders the private investigator and kidnaps Paula, putting her in his car trunk. When he later tries to retrieve her, Paula shoots him with the gun she got at the pawn shop.
7	"Flighting"	Alethea Jones	Saba Saghafi & Tiffany So	June 24, 2026
Paula takes Dennis's phone and flees, but Geri and Rudy tell her to go back to the scene and report the incident. When she does, all traces of Dennis and his car have disappeared. Paula, Geri, and Rudy investigate Dennis's phone and find that he kept sending Amazon packages to an elderly woman's home under the name John Smith. When they go to investigate, the woman is aware of the packages but pretends its just an accidental incident. Paula believes she's lying but they leave without learning anything. The woman then calls Dennis's boss, Brian, and reports the incident. Brian begins to watch Paula. Rudy begins to think Paula is crazy and/or behind the killings, while Geri considers writing a story on her. Ash drives down to Florida and retrieves a buried evidence box, containing the videos that she, Trevor, and Sky used to blackmail clients, alongside a gun and cash. As Paula later prepares for a date with a dad from Hazel's school, she is arrested for the murders of Trevor and Sky.
8	"Hallidays"	Damon Thomas	Andrew Gottlieb	July 1, 2026
Paula wakes up in a Rikers Island holding cell, where she is visited by a lawyer, Rebecca Halliday, sent by Doug, her divorce attorney. She confides her full story to her, only to later be visited by a second woman claiming to be Rebecca Halliday, and she realizes the first was an impostor. Karl bails Paula out but tells her that Hazel will stay with him and Mallory, with Paula limited to supervised visits. Doug and the real Rebecca advise Paula to stay home and avoid further trouble. Paula decides to order a package with Dennis's Amazon account and follow it; she goes into a house and is confronted by Ashley, Trevor's friend, who has also broken in. Ashley reveals that she knows that Paula didn't murder Trevor or Sky; Paula takes her to the police station in an attempt to get her to exonerate her, but Ashley escapes, dropping a USB drive with video files from Trevor's cam sessions. Rudy reinserts the battery into the phone they got from Dennis to try to unlock it, inadvertently allowing Jennifer, the fake Halliday, to trace his location. Meanwhile, Geri questions a Yale admissions officer, Joyce, about her past dealings with Dennis, but doesn't learn anything.
9	"Erroneous"	Damon Thomas	Johanna Ramm & Andrew Gottlieb	July 8, 2026
The fake Jennifer breaks into Rudy's apartment, knocks him out, and takes back Dennis's burner phone. Meanwhile, Paula uses the videos found on the USB drive to find the different people blackmailed by Trevor and Dennis; she learns that they were all blackmailed for their professional knowledge and positions, and not for money, which confuses Paula. She tells Geri and Rudy about these blackmail attempts, and Geri informs her about the Yale admissions officer. They confront her again, and learn that she was blackmailed to accept an applicant. Paula realizes that the applicant is the son of the powerful corporation that is otherwise using the blackmail for their enrichment, and she goes to break into its corporate retreat. Gonzalez realizes that Jennifer is the fake Halliday, and identifies her car; Detective Baxter locates it and follows her. Jennifer has been tracking Paula and is about to shoot her, but Baxter confronts Jennifer at gunpoint.
10	"Queens"	Alethea Jones	David J. Rosen and Andrew Gottlieb	July 15, 2026
Baxter is shot and put in the hospital, while Paula is able to get on the golf course. Paula confronts the SVP about employing Dennis, but she denies any involvement and calls security. Before they arrive, Paula brings up her son's acceptance to Yale, and states that she has proof that will get his acceptance overturned unless she can be exonerated. It is revealed that Dennis survived his shooting and is undergoing physical therapy, only for his suicide to be staged with a note confessing to the murders of Trevor and Sky that exonerates Paula. The charges are dropped against Paula, and the judge rules in the custody battle that Hazel will stay in New York. Jennifer is sent to kill Paula, but is shot and killed by her employer as she is getting ready to leave. Detective Gonzalez expresses worry about how everything went smoothly, believing that a cover up is involved. Paula rebuffs her, while Baxter is shown to have survived his shooting. As Paula relaxes after her party, she receives a video message showing evidence of her intentionally driving into and killing her neighbor in Portland, along with a text message saying "We own you." Paula then receives a phone call, which she answers.

== Production ==
=== Development ===
The series is directed and executive produced by David Gordon Green and written and executive produced by creator and showrunner David J. Rosen. The 10-episode series was developed by and is executive produced by Simon Kinberg and Audrey Chon for Genre Films under their first-look deal with Apple TV+, as well as Bard Dorros for Anonymous Content. The series is also produced by Apple Studios and Counterpart Studios. In October 2026, Apple TV renewed the series for a second season.

=== Casting ===
Apple TV+ announced Tatiana Maslany's casting in February 2025. In July 2025, Jake Johnson and Dolly de Leon joined the starring cast. In August 2025, Charlie Hall, Kiarra Hamagami Goldberg, Jessy Hodges, Jon Michael Hill, and Nola Wallace were cast as series regulars. On February 3, 2026, Brandon Flynn and Murray Bartlett were revealed to be in the cast.

=== Filming ===
Principal photography was reported to be occurring in October 2025. Filming locations include Queens, New York.

== Release ==
Maximum Pleasure Guaranteed was released on Apple TV on May 20, 2026, with the first two episodes available immediately and the rest debuting on a weekly basis until July 15.

== Reception ==
On the review aggregator website Rotten Tomatoes, the series holds an approval rating of 93%, based on 58 reviews, with an average of rated reviews of 7.4/10. The website's critics consensus reads, "Tatiana Maslany boldly leads this twistedly thrilling whodunit, serving as a fascinating exploration of the unexpected through compelling storytelling, diverting escapades, and the undeniable assurance of Maximum Pleasure Guaranteed." Metacritic, which uses a weighted average, assigned a score of 72 out of 100 based on 22 critics, indicating "generally favorable" reviews.

Maslany received praise for her performance. Angie Han of The Hollywood Reporter wrote Maslany "effortlessly [embodies] Paula in all her contradictions — she's a genuinely good mom and one who desperately needs (in Karl's exasperated words) to 'tighten [her] fucking shit up,' a sympathetic victim in over her head and someone who can't seem to stop running headfirst into bad ideas. Without going out of her way to make Paula seem 'likable' or even necessarily 'relatable,' Maslany's naturalistic performance keeps her endlessly fascinating." Han also praised the supporting cast and Murray Bartlett, "who gets to play a full range of energies — from warm to icy, charismatic to slightly pathetic".

Brian Tallerico of The A.V. Club wrote Maximum Pleasure Guaranteed is a "well-paced, wonderfully performed, and unpredictable" show that "employs the lost TV arts of tempo and rhythm, with propulsive episodes that never overstay their welcome". Tallerico said the show hints at themes about technology in the modern era and how "we give so much of ourselves to relative strangers online without asking enough questions about the hidden costs".
