= Léopold Louis-Dreyfus =

French grain trading magnate (1833–1915)

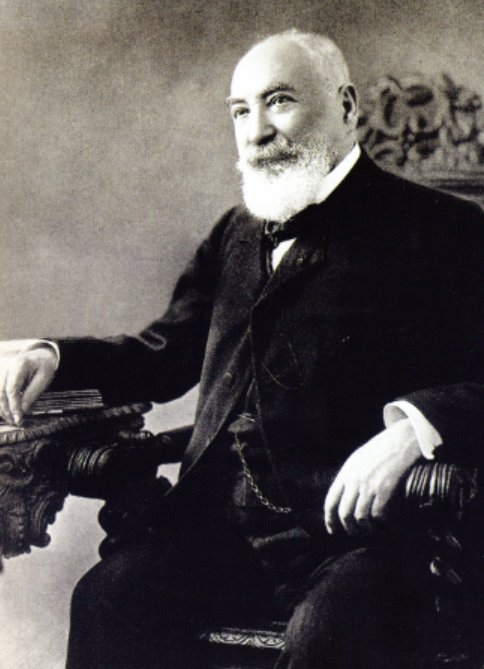
- Born: Léopold Dreyfus; 5 March 1833; Sierentz, France
- Died: 9 April 1915 (aged 82); Paris, France
- Citizenship: French
- Occupations: Businessman, diplomat, investor
- Spouse: Émilie Lang
- Children: 3, including Louis and Charles
- Relatives: Pierre Louis-Dreyfus (grandson); Gérard Louis-Dreyfus (great-grandson); Robert Louis-Dreyfus (great-grandson); Julia Louis-Dreyfus (great-great-granddaughter); Charlie Hall (great-great-great-grandson)

Léopold Louis-Dreyfus (5 March 1833 – 9 April 1915) was a French businessman, diplomat, and investor who was best known as the founder of the Louis Dreyfus Group, and patriarch of the Louis-Dreyfus family.

The French government awarded him the title Commander of the Legion of Honour in 1912.

== Biography ==
Louis-Dreyfus was born Léopold Dreyfus to a Jewish family in Sierentz in Alsace in north-eastern France. His parents were Louis Lemlé Dreyfus (1798–1879), a farmer, and Jeannette Victoire (née Hildenfinger; 1803–1837).

== Business ==
As a youth, the younger Dreyfus made frequent trips to nearby Basel, Switzerland, delivering grain for sale from the family farm. In 1851, he began trading wheat from neighbouring farms. He founded a company under his father's name, as he was too young to use his own. The younger Dreyfus later changed his surname to Louis-Dreyfus, but kept the company name without the hyphen.

In 1858, after rapid growth, he moved the company to Berne, Switzerland, where it expanded its operations throughout Europe by purchasing grain from the "breadbaskets" of Eastern Europe and transporting it to the hungry markets in Western Europe. In 1864, the company moved to Zurich, Switzerland and in 1872, after the Franco-Prussian War when France ceded Alsace to Germany, Louis Dreyfus chose French citizenship. He moved to the shipping port of Marseille and by 1875 had moved his company's headquarters to Paris.

The development of a transcontinental railroad in Europe combined with a more reliable shipping network and better access to market information – after the development of the telegraph and telephone – enabled the Louis Dreyfus Group to grow rapidly via arbitrage: the taking advantage of price differentials between locations. In 1883, the Louis Dreyfus Group was one of the first companies to engage in futures trading at the Liverpool Corn Trade Association, allowing it to both buy and sell commodities simultaneously. By 1900, the Louis Dreyfus Group was the world's largest grain trader.

In 1905, the Banque Louis-Dreyfus was founded to help finance the company's operations in grain markets. Thereafter, the company expanded internationally: in 1909, it opened an office in Duluth, Minnesota and began exporting durum wheat; in 1911, it started trading cotton in Brazil; and in 1913, it set up operations in Melbourne. In 1915 Léopold Louis-Dreyfus died, turning over the family company to sons Louis and Charles.

== Personal life ==
In 1860, Léopold Louis-Dreyfus married Émilie Lang (1840–1918), daughter of Isaac Lang and Rosalie (née Aron) Lang. They had three sons: Louis Louis-Dreyfus (1867–1940), Charles Louis-Dreyfus (1870–1929), and Robert Louis-Dreyfus (1877–1907). He is the great-great-grandfather of American actress and comedian Julia Louis-Dreyfus.

By the early 20th century, the Louis-Dreyfus family was described as one of the "five great fortunes of France".

Louis-Dreyfus also served as Consul-General for the Kingdom of Romania in Paris. He was awarded the title of Commander of the Legion of Honour (French: Commandeur de la Légion d'honneur) on 19 April 1912.

== Legacy ==
Léopold Louis-Dreyfus died in 1915 and was succeeded at the Louis Dreyfus Group by his sons Louis and Charles, who expanded the company in the Americas and in the Russian Empire (prior to the 1917 Revolution). In 2013, the Louis Dreyfus Group is considered to be one of the "big four" global food trading companies in the world, competing with Archer Daniels Midland, Bunge Limited, and Cargill Inc.
