= List of awards and nominations received by Julia Louis-Dreyfus =

Julia Louis-Dreyfus awards and nominations
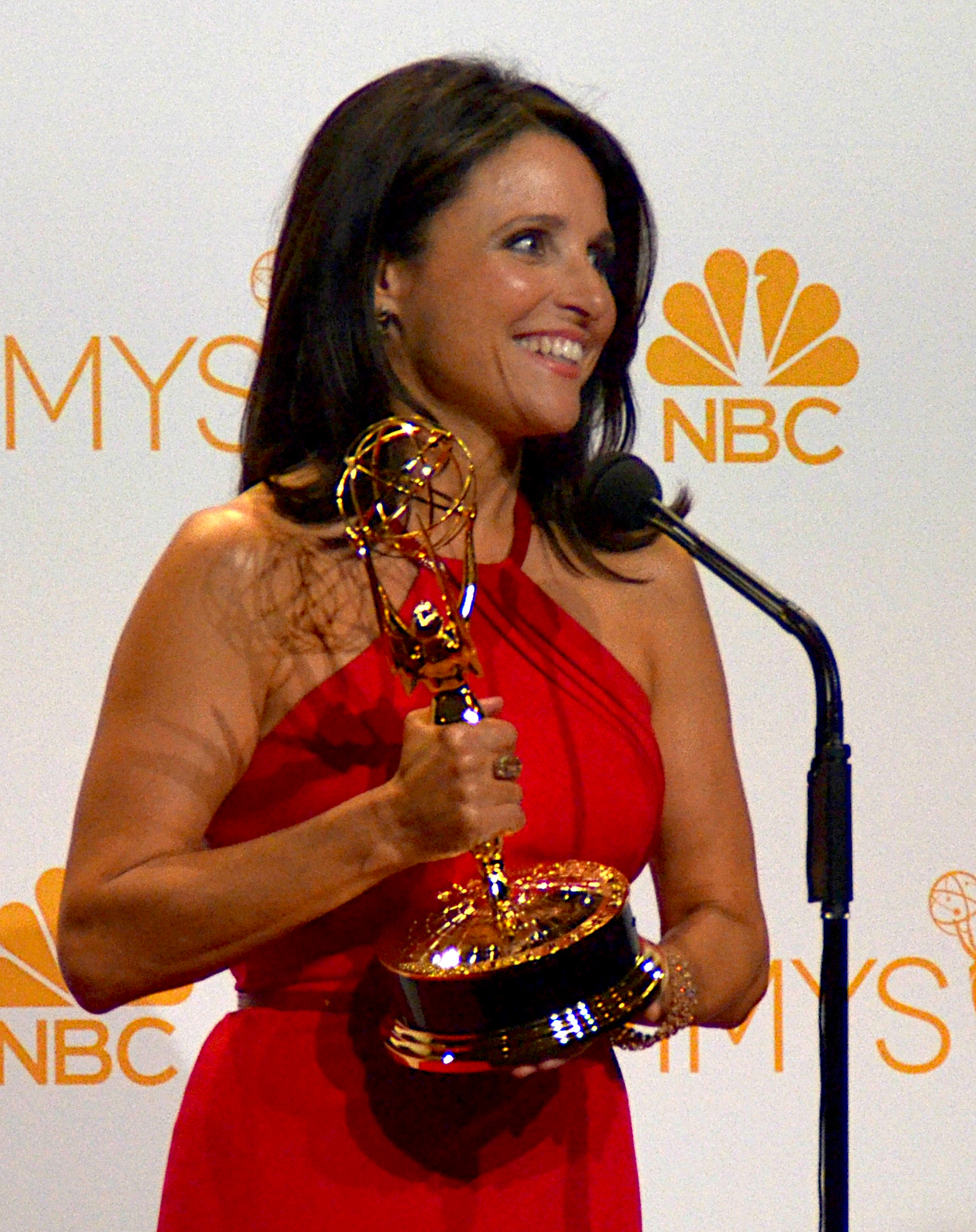
- Louis-Dreyfus after her win at the 66th Primetime Emmy Awards in 2014
Awards and nominations
Award	Wins	Nominations
Totals
Critics' Choice Awards	2	7
Golden Globe Awards	1	9
Emmy Awards	11	26
Screen Actors Guild Awards	9	21
Wins	27
Nominations	97

This article is a list of awards and nominations received by Julia Louis-Dreyfus.

Julia Louis-Dreyfus is an American actress, comedian and producer. She is known for leading roles on television and film. She has received numerous accolades including 11 Primetime Emmy Awards, two Critics' Choice Awards, a Golden Globe Award, and nine Screen Actors Guild Awards. She received the Mark Twain Prize for American Humor in 2018 and the National Medal of Arts in 2021.

Louis–Dreyfus started her career on the NBC sketch comedy series Saturday Night Live (1982–1985). She gained stardom for her role as Elaine Benes in the NBC sitcom Seinfeld (1990–1998) for which she earned a Golden Globe Award for Best Supporting Actress – Series, Miniseries or Television Film in 1994 and a Primetime Emmy Award for Outstanding Supporting Actress in a Comedy Series in 1996, and two Screen Actors Guild Awards for Outstanding Actress in a Comedy Series in 1996 and 1997. She then played Christine Campbell in the CBS sitcom The New Adventures of Old Christine (2006–2010) earning a Primetime Emmy Award for Outstanding Lead Actress in a Comedy Series in 2006 as well as a nomination for the Golden Globe Award for Best Actress – Television Series Musical or Comedy in 2007.

She earned acclaim for her role as Selina Meyer in the HBO satirical political comedy series Veep (2012–2017) where she earned six consecutive wins for the Primetime Emmy Award for Outstanding Lead Actress in a Comedy Series. As of 2017, she holds the record for the most Primetime Emmy wins as an actor for the same role and is tied with Cloris Leachman for the most acting Primetime Emmy wins (with eight). She also earned three Primetime Emmy Awards for Outstanding Comedy Series as a producer on the series. Additionally, as an actress on the show, she earned three Screen Actors Guild Awards for Outstanding Actress in a Comedy Series and two Critics' Choice Television Awards for Best Actress in a Comedy Series as well as nominations for five Golden Globe Awards for Best Actress – Television Series Musical or Comedy.

On film, Louis-Dreyfus took a leading role as a divorced mother looking for love in the romantic comedy-drama Enough Said (2013) where she received nominations for the Critics' Choice Movie Award for Best Actress in a Comedy and the Golden Globe Award for Best Actress in a Motion Picture – Musical or Comedy. She portrayed Valentina Allegra de Fontaine in the Marvel Cinematic Universe superhero film Thunderbolts* (2025) for which she was nominated for the Critics' Choice Super Award for Best Actress in a Superhero Movie.

== Major associations ==
=== Actor Awards ===
Year	Category	Nominated work	Result	Ref.
1994	Outstanding Performance by a Female Actor in a Comedy Series	Seinfeld (season five)	Nominated	
1994	Outstanding Performance by an Ensemble in a Comedy Series	Seinfeld (season five)	Won	
1995	Outstanding Performance by an Ensemble in a Comedy Series	Seinfeld (season six)	Nominated	
1995	Outstanding Performance by a Female Actor in a Comedy Series	Seinfeld (season six)	Nominated	
1996	Outstanding Performance by a Female Actor in a Comedy Series	Seinfeld (season seven)	Won	
1996	Outstanding Performance by an Ensemble in a Comedy Series	Seinfeld (season seven)	Won	
1997	Outstanding Performance by an Ensemble in a Comedy Series	Seinfeld (season eight)	Won	
1997	Outstanding Performance by a Female Actor in a Comedy Series	Seinfeld (season eight)	Won	
1998	Outstanding Performance by a Female Actor in a Comedy Series	Seinfeld (season nine)	Nominated	
2006	Outstanding Performance by a Female Actor in a Comedy Series	The New Adventures of Old Christine (season two)	Nominated	
2009	Outstanding Performance by a Female Actor in a Comedy Series	The New Adventures of Old Christine (season five)	Nominated	
2013	Outstanding Performance by a Female Actor in a Comedy Series	Veep (season two)	Won	
2013	Outstanding Performance by an Ensemble in a Comedy Series	Veep (season two)	Nominated	
2014	Outstanding Performance by an Ensemble in a Comedy Series	Veep (season three)	Nominated	
2014	Outstanding Performance by a Female Actor in a Comedy Series	Veep (season three)	Nominated	
2015	Outstanding Performance by a Female Actor in a Comedy Series	Veep (season four)	Nominated	
2015	Outstanding Performance by an Ensemble in a Comedy Series	Veep (season four)	Nominated	
2016	Outstanding Performance by an Ensemble in a Comedy Series	Veep (season five)	Nominated	
2016	Outstanding Performance by a Female Actor in a Comedy Series	Veep (season five)	Won	
2017	Outstanding Performance by a Female Actor in a Comedy Series	Veep (season six)	Won	
2017	Outstanding Performance by an Ensemble in a Comedy Series	Veep (season six)	Won	

=== Critics' Choice Awards ===
Year	Category	Nominated work	Result	Ref.
Critics' Choice Television Awards
2012	Best Actress in a Comedy Series	Veep (season one)	Nominated	
2013	Best Actress in a Comedy Series	Veep (season two)	Won	
2014	Best Actress in a Comedy Series	Veep (season three)	Won	
2015	Best Actress in a Comedy Series	Veep (season four)	Nominated	
2016	Best Actress in a Comedy Series	Veep (season five)	Nominated	
Critics' Choice Movie Awards
2014	Best Actress in a Comedy Film	Enough Said	Nominated	
Critics' Choice Super Awards
2025	Best Actress in a Superhero Movie	Thunderbolts*	Nominated	

=== Emmy Awards ===
Year	Category	Nominated work	Result	Ref.
Primetime Emmy Awards
1992	Outstanding Supporting Actress in a Comedy Series	Seinfeld (episode: "The Pen" + "The Tape")	Nominated	
1993	Outstanding Supporting Actress in a Comedy Series	Seinfeld (episode: "The Contest" + "The Airport")	Nominated	
1994	Outstanding Supporting Actress in a Comedy Series	Seinfeld (episode: "The Mango" + "The Opposite")	Nominated	
1995	Outstanding Supporting Actress in a Comedy Series	Seinfeld (episode: "The Beard" + "The Fusilli Jerry")	Nominated	
1996	Outstanding Supporting Actress in a Comedy Series	Seinfeld (episode: "The Soup Nazi" + "The Wait Out")	Won	
1997	Outstanding Supporting Actress in a Comedy Series	Seinfeld (episode: "The Little Kicks")	Nominated	
1998	Outstanding Supporting Actress in a Comedy Series	Seinfeld (season nine)	Nominated	
2006	Outstanding Lead Actress in a Comedy Series	The New Adventures of Old Christine (episode: "Supertramp")	Won	
2007	Outstanding Lead Actress in a Comedy Series	The New Adventures of Old Christine (episode: "Playdate with Destiny")	Nominated	
2008	Outstanding Lead Actress in a Comedy Series	The New Adventures of Old Christine (episode: "One and a Half Men")	Nominated	
2009	Outstanding Lead Actress in a Comedy Series	The New Adventures of Old Christine (episode: "Everyone Says I Love You")	Nominated	
2010	Outstanding Lead Actress in a Comedy Series	The New Adventures of Old Christine (episode: "I Love What You Do for Me")	Nominated	
2012	Outstanding Comedy Series (as a producer)	Veep (season one)	Nominated	
2012	Outstanding Lead Actress in a Comedy Series	Veep (episode: "Tears")	Won	
2013	Outstanding Comedy Series (as a producer)	Veep (season two)	Nominated	
2013	Outstanding Lead Actress in a Comedy Series	Veep (episode: "Running")	Won	
2014	Outstanding Comedy Series (as a producer)	Veep (season three)	Nominated	
2014	Outstanding Lead Actress in a Comedy Series	Veep (episode: "Crate")	Won	
2015	Outstanding Comedy Series (as a producer)	Veep (season four)	Won	
2015	Outstanding Lead Actress in a Comedy Series	Veep (episode: "Election Night")	Won	
2016	Outstanding Comedy Series (as a producer)	Veep (season five)	Won	
2016	Outstanding Lead Actress in a Comedy Series	Veep (episode: "Mother")	Won	
2017	Outstanding Comedy Series (as a producer)	Veep (season six)	Won	
2017	Outstanding Lead Actress in a Comedy Series	Veep (episode: "Groundbreaking")	Won	
2019	Outstanding Comedy Series (as a producer)	Veep (season seven)	Nominated	
2019	Outstanding Lead Actress in a Comedy Series	Veep (episode: "Veep")	Nominated	

=== Golden Globe Awards ===
Year	Category	Nominated work	Result	Ref.
1994	Best Supporting Actress – Series, Miniseries, or Television Film	Seinfeld	Won	
1995	Best Supporting Actress – Series, Miniseries, or Television Film	Seinfeld	Nominated	
2007	Best Actress – Television Series Musical or Comedy	The New Adventures of Old Christine	Nominated	
2013	Best Actress – Television Series Musical or Comedy	Veep	Nominated	
2014	Best Actress – Motion Picture Musical or Comedy	Enough Said	Nominated	
2014	Best Actress – Television Series Musical or Comedy	Veep	Nominated	
2015	Best Actress – Television Series Musical or Comedy	Veep	Nominated	
2016	Best Actress – Television Series Musical or Comedy	Veep	Nominated	
2017	Best Actress – Television Series Musical or Comedy	Veep	Nominated	

== Miscellaneous awards ==
Organizations	Year	Category	Work	Result	Ref.
American Comedy Awards	1993	Funniest Supporting Female Performer in a TV Series	Seinfeld	Won	
American Comedy Awards	1994	Funniest Supporting Female Performer in a TV Series	Seinfeld	Won	
American Comedy Awards	1995	Funniest Supporting Female Performer in a TV Series	Seinfeld	Won	
American Comedy Awards	1996	Funniest Supporting Female Performer in a TV Series	Seinfeld	Nominated	
American Comedy Awards	1997	Funniest Supporting Female Performer in a TV Series	Seinfeld	Won	
American Comedy Awards	1998	Funniest Supporting Female Performer in a TV Series	Seinfeld	Won	
American Comedy Awards	1999	Funniest Supporting Female Performer in a TV Series	Seinfeld	Nominated	
American Comedy Awards	2001	Funniest Female Guest Appearance in a TV Series	Curb Your Enthusiasm	Nominated	
American Comedy Awards	2014	Comedy Actress – Film	Enough Said	Nominated	
American Comedy Awards	2014	Comedy Actress – TV	Veep	Nominated	
People's Choice Awards	1997	Favorite Female TV Performer	Seinfeld	Nominated	
People's Choice Awards	1999	Favorite Female TV Performer	Seinfeld	Nominated	
People's Choice Awards	2007	Favorite Female TV Performer	The New Adventures of Old Christine	Nominated	
People's Choice Awards	2007	Favorite Funny Female Star	The New Adventures of Old Christine	Nominated	
People's Choice Awards	2016	Favorite Premium Cable TV Actress	Veep	Nominated	
People's Choice Awards	2017	Favorite Premium Series Actress	Veep	Nominated	
Producers Guild of America Award	2013	Outstanding Producer of Episodic Television, Comedy	Veep	Nominated	
Producers Guild of America Award	2014	Outstanding Producer of Episodic Television, Comedy	Veep	Nominated	
Producers Guild of America Award	2015	Outstanding Producer of Episodic Television, Comedy	Veep	Nominated	
Producers Guild of America Award	2016	Outstanding Producer of Episodic Television, Comedy	Veep	Nominated	
Satellite Awards	2007	Best Actress – Television Series Musical or Comedy	The New Adventures of Old Christine	Nominated	
Satellite Awards	2008	Best Actress – Television Series Musical or Comedy	The New Adventures of Old Christine	Nominated	
Satellite Awards	2009	Best Actress – Television Series Musical or Comedy	The New Adventures of Old Christine	Nominated	
Satellite Awards	2012	Best Actress – Television Series Musical or Comedy	Veep	Nominated	
Satellite Awards	2013	Best Actress – Television Series Musical or Comedy	Veep	Nominated	
Satellite Awards	2014	Best Actress – Motion Picture	Enough Said	Nominated	
Satellite Awards	2014	Best Actress – Television Series Musical or Comedy	Veep	Nominated	
Satellite Awards	2015	Best Actress – Television Series Musical or Comedy	Veep	Nominated	
Satellite Awards	2016	Best Actress – Television Series Musical or Comedy	Veep	Nominated	
Satellite Awards	2018	Best Actress – Television Series Musical or Comedy	Veep	Nominated	
Television Critics Association	2012	Outstanding Individual Achievement in Comedy	Veep	Nominated	
Television Critics Association	2013	Outstanding Individual Achievement in Comedy	Veep	Nominated	
Television Critics Association	2014	Outstanding Individual Achievement in Comedy	Veep	Won	
Television Critics Association	2015	Outstanding Individual Achievement in Comedy	Veep	Nominated	
Television Critics Association	2016	Outstanding Individual Achievement in Comedy	Veep	Nominated	
Television Critics Association	2017	Outstanding Individual Achievement in Comedy	Veep	Nominated	
Television Critics Association	2019	Outstanding Individual Achievement in Comedy	Veep	Nominated	

== Honorary awards ==
Organizations	Year	Award	Result	Ref.
Hollywood Walk of Fame	2010	Hollywood Star at 6250 Hollywood Blvd.	Honored	
Television Academy	2014	Television Hall of Fame Induction	Honored	
BAFA LA Britannia Awards	2014	Charlie Chaplin Excellence in Comedy Award	Honored	
Time magazine	2016	100 most influential people in the world	Honored	
John F. Kennedy Center for the Performing Arts	2018	Mark Twain Prize for American Humor	Honored	
National Endowment for the Arts	2021	National Medal of Arts	Honored	
