= Pierre Louis-Dreyfus =

French soldier and businessman

- Born: 17 May 1908; Paris, France
- Died: 15 January 2011 (aged 102); Neuilly-sur-Seine, France
- Occupations: Soldier, businessman
- Spouses: Dolores Neubauer (m. 1929; div. 1936) Claude Singer (m. 1939; died 2005)
- Children: 4, including Gérard Louis-Dreyfus
- Parent(s): Charles Louis-Dreyfus; Sarah Germaine Hément
- Relatives: Julia Louis-Dreyfus (granddaughter); Charlie Hall (great-grandson); Simon Mann (great-grandson)

Pierre Louis-Dreyfus (17 May 1908 – 15 January 2011) was a French Resistance fighter during World War II who later was CEO of the Louis Dreyfus Cie.

== Early life and education ==
Pierre Louis-Dreyfus was born on 17 May 1908 in Paris, one of four children born to Charles Louis-Dreyfus (1870–1929), a merchant and ship-owner, and Sarah Germaine Hément. His family was Jewish. His paternal grandfather, Léopold Louis-Dreyfus, founded the Louis Dreyfus Group in 1851. He had two siblings, brother François Louis-Dreyfus (1909–1958) and sister, Arlette Louis -Dreyfus (1911–2001). His granddaughter is Julia Louis-Dreyfus.

In 1928, he graduated from the Lycée Condorcet with a joint degree in arts and law.

== Military service ==
Called to military service, he became a cadet in the Reserve Cavalry School at Saumur in October 1928 and was released in May 1929 with the rank of sub-lieutenant. He was then assigned to the 6th Dragoons until his release in October 1929. Thereafter, he worked in the family business, Louis Dreyfus & Cie., eventually becoming a partner. He was recalled in August 1939 and served as a lieutenant in the 2nd Dragoon Regiment. He served two rotations in Luxembourg and France before again being discharged after the French capitulation.

In 1941, along with his friends, Emile Laffon, Jacques Bounin and Emmanuel d'Astier, he came into contact with and joined the French Resistance. Having extensive military training, Louis-Dreyfus was assigned responsibility for coordinating the resistance groups in the south of France. He was forced to flee France in December 1942 and arrived back in England in January 1943. In April 1943, he joined the 1st Free French Division in Africa and was promoted to captain serving as a liaison officer with the Scottish 51st Highland Division. In December 1943, he requested assignment to the Bomber Group "Lorraine" where he served as a gunner. From July 1944 until May 1945, he flew 81 bombing missions on the Western Front in Belgium, the Netherlands, and Germany. He received four citations for his "tireless work" and for exhibiting the "best professional qualities, military and moral." He was then assigned as a representative of the French Army assigned to the 137th Wing of the Royal Air Force.

== Post military career ==
After the war, he returned to the family business, Louis-Dreyfus and Co where he became first vice-president and then was CEO from 1967 until 1975. He significantly expanded the maritime trade of the company under his direction. The company, now known as Louis Dreyfus Group, had $46 billion in sales in 2011. Upon retirement, his son, Gérard Louis-Dreyfus, headed the company.

He also was vice president on the Board of Directors of the Société d'entraide des Compagnons de la Libération (Society for the Support for members of the French Resistance), was a member of the Conseil supérieur de la marine marchande (Supreme Council of Marine Merchants) and vice-president of the Comité central des armateurs de France (Central Committee of French shipowners).

He was a member of the Conseil de l'Ordre de la Libération from June 1969.

== Personal life and death ==
Louis-Dreyfus was married twice. In 1929, he married American-born Dolores Neubauer, the daughter of a Jewish Brazilian father and a Mexican mother. They had two children: a daughter, Dominique (b. 1930), and a son, Gerard (1932–2016). They separated in 1935 and divorced in 1936. Dolores obtained custody of children and while Pierre was fighting in World War II; she moved to the United States in 1940 and returned to France in 1945. She remarried to Michel Théodore Robert Edmond Porges (1908–1999).

In 1939, Pierre married Claude Singer. They had two children, Philippe (b. 1945) and Danièle Louis-Dreyfus (died 2006). Philippe is the president of Louis Dreyfus Shipping. He married Anne Boinvilliers, with whom he has three children Charlotte, Edouard, and Marie. Danièle married Jean Sudreau, the son of French politician Pierre Sudreau; they have a daughter, Laure Sudreau. Danièle died of breast cancer in 2006.

Louis-Dreyfus participated in the 24 Hours of Le Mans eleven times between 1931 and 1955. He raced under the pseudonym 'Heldé', derived from L-D (Louis-Dreyfus).

Pierre Louis-Dreyfus died on 15 January 2011 in Neuilly-sur-Seine. He was buried in Ville d'Avray in the Hauts-de-Seine.

== Accolades ==
Louis-Dreyfus earned the following medals and merits:

- Grand Officer of the Legion of Honor
- Companion of the Liberation - Decree of 17 November 1945
- Croix de Guerre 39/45 (6 citations)
- Medal of the Resistance with Rosette
- Commander of Maritime Merit
- Escapees' Medal
- Officer of Sporting Merit
- Officer of the Tourist Merit
