= Louis Dreyfus Company =

French, global merchant firm

Louis Dreyfus Company B.V.
- Company type: Subsidiary
- Industry: Merchant
- Genre: Agriculture, Food processing, Transportation
- Founded: 1851; 175 years ago
- Founder: Léopold Louis-Dreyfus
- Headquarters: Rotterdam, Netherlands
- Area served: Worldwide (operations in 100+ countries)
- Key people: Margarita Louis-Dreyfus (chairman); Michel Demaré (deputy chairman); Michael Gelchie (CEO); Michael Gelchie (COO)
- Products: Oilseeds, grains, juice, fertilisers, cotton, sugar, rice, coffee, dairy, metals, etc.
- Services: Freight, finance, etc.
- Revenue: ▼US$36.5 billion (FY2018)
- Operating income: US$1,048 million (FY2018)
- Net income: US$357 million (FY2018); US$317 million (FY2017)
- Total assets: US$18.4 billion (FY2018)
- Total equity: US$5,034 million (FY2018)
- Owner: ADQ (45%)
- Number of employees: 22,000+ (FY2015)
- Parent: Louis Dreyfus Holding B.V.
- Website: www.ldc.com

Louis Dreyfus Company B.V. (LDC) is a Dutch-French multinational merchant firm that is involved in agriculture, food processing, international shipping, and finance. The company owns and manages hedge funds, ocean vessels, develops and operates telecommunications infrastructures, and it is also involved in real estate development, management and ownership. Along with Archer Daniels Midland, Bunge, and Cargill, Louis Dreyfus is one of the four "ABCD" companies that dominate world agricultural commodity trading.

The company makes up about 10% of the world's agricultural product trade flows, and is the world's largest cotton and rice trader. It is also regarded by many as the second-largest player in the world's sugar market. LDC Metals expanded to become the world's third biggest trader of copper, zinc and lead concentrate, behind only Glencore and Trafigura.

Louis Dreyfus Company has its head office in Rotterdam, Netherlands. The company's parent, Louis Dreyfus Holding B.V., has its headquarters at the World Trade Center in Amsterdam. Louis Dreyfus companies are present in more than 100 countries, with 72 offices. Major offices are located in Geneva, London, Beijing, Buenos Aires, Paris, São Paulo, Singapore, New York City and Connecticut.

Aggregate average annual gross sales in recent years have exceeded US$120 billion. The company employs more than 22,000 people globally at peak season.

== History ==
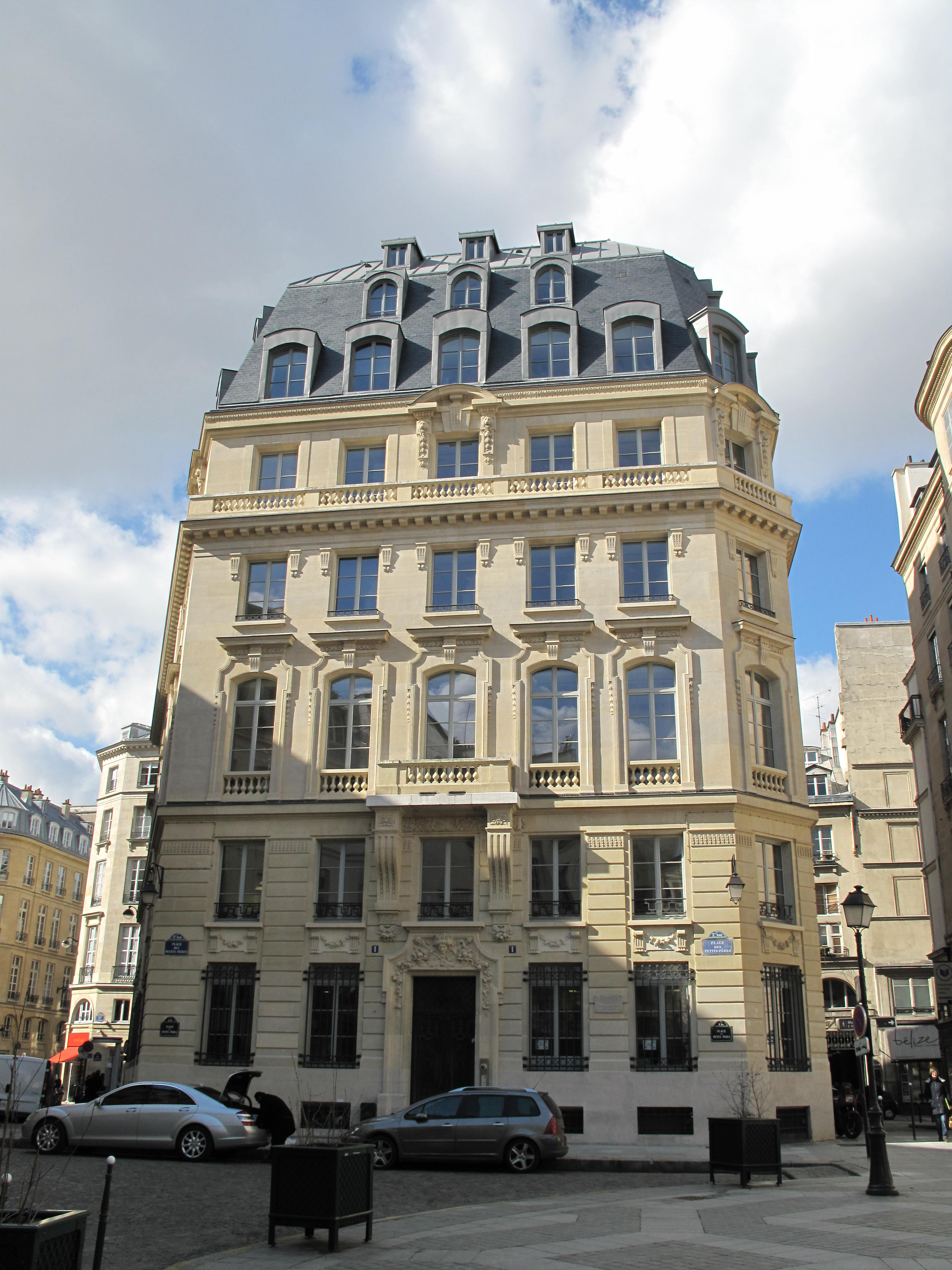
Former head office of the Banque Louis-Dreyfus, 1 place des Petits-Pères in Paris

In 1851, the company was founded in the Alsace region of France by Léopold Dreyfus, the 18-year-old Alsatian Ashkenazi Jewish son of a farmer from Sierentz, under the name of his father, Louis Dreyfus. Léopold purchased wheat from local farmers in Alsace and transported it to Basel in Switzerland, 13 kilometres (8 mi) away. Léopold developed a fortune whilst still a teenager through cross border cereal trading. He rapidly diversified across shipping, weapons manufacturing, agriculture, oil and banking, thus establishing one of the wealthiest dynasties in Europe. His descendants still own the company to this day. By the early 20th century, the Louis-Dreyfus family was described as one of the "top five biggest fortunes of France".

The family being Jewish, during the Second World War much of the family assets were confiscated by the Vichy government and some members of the family fled to America. In 1941 a temporary non-Jewish administrator was appointed to run the Louis Dreyfus Corn Dealers company.

On 11 May 2018, Louis Dreyfus Company sold its metals platform (LDC Metals, or LDCM) to NCCL Natural Resources Investment Fund. The final price of the transaction was US$466 million.

In December 2023, Louis Dreyfus Company made a takeover bid to acquire Australian cotton processor Namoi Cotton.

In March 2024, it was announced LDC had signed a binding agreement to fully acquire the Brazilian instant coffee exporter, Cacique for an undisclosed amount.

== Family ==
Léopold Louis-Dreyfus's great-grandson, Gérard Louis-Dreyfus, was chairman of Louis Dreyfus Energy Services, a subsidiary of the group involved in crude-oil trading, gas investments and infrastructure. Gérard is also the father of American actress Julia Louis-Dreyfus. Another branch of the dynasty, based in Paris, was headed by Robert Louis-Dreyfus (who was also the CEO of Adidas) until his death in 2009. It is currently overseen by his widow, Russian-born Margarita Bogdanova Louis-Dreyfus. A third branch of the family's business is headed by Philippe Louis-Dreyfus (b. 1945) and is concerned primarily with offshore industrial activities and freight shipping operations.

== Tax evasion allegations ==
A case of transfer mispricing came to light in 2011 in Argentina involving the world's four largest grain traders, ADM, Bunge, Cargill and LDC. Argentina's revenue and customs service began an investigation into the four companies when prices for agricultural commodities spiked in 2008 and yet very little profit for the four companies had been reported to the office. As a result of the investigation, it was alleged that the companies had submitted false declarations of sales and routed profits through tax havens or through their headquarters. In some cases, they were said to have used phantom firms to buy grain and had inflated costs in Argentina in order to reduce the recorded profits earned in the country. According to the country's revenue and customs service, the outstanding taxes amounted to almost US$1 billion. The companies involved have denied the allegations. To date, the Argentinian tax authorities have not replied to the Swiss NGO Public Eye's request regarding the current state of the case. In its 2018 annual report to the US Securities and Exchange Commission (SEC), Bunge mentioned provisions which suggest that the case is still ongoing: "[A]s of December 31, 2018, Bunge's Argentine subsidiary had received income tax assessments relating to 2006 through 2009 of approximately 1,276 million Argentine pesos (approximately $34 million), plus applicable interest on the outstanding amount of approximately 4,246 million Argentine pesos (approximately $113 million)."

== See also ==
- Pierre Louis-Dreyfus
- Louis Louis-Dreyfus
- LD Lines
