= Charles Louis-Dreyfus =

French businessman (1870–1929)

- Born: August 21, 1870; Zurich, Switzerland
- Died: July 30, 1929 (aged 58); Ville-d'Avray, Paris, France
- Known for: Co-director of Louis Dreyfus Group
- Spouse: Sarah Germaine Hément
- Children: 4, including Pierre Louis-Dreyfus
- Parent(s): Léopold Louis-Dreyfus; Emilie Lang

Charles Louis-Dreyfus (August 21, 1870 – July 30, 1929) was a co-director of the commodity distribution and trading company, Louis Dreyfus Group.

== Biography ==
Louis-Dreyfus was born in Zurich to a Jewish family, the middle of three sons of Léopold Louis-Dreyfus (1833–1915) and Emilie Lang (1840–1918). His brothers were Louis Louis-Dreyfus (1867–1940) and Robert Louis-Dreyfus (1877–1907). In 1851, his father, the son of a farmer from Alsace, founded the commodity distributor and trader Louis Dreyfus Group growing the business to the point that in 1900, it was the world's largest grain distributor. In 1915, his father died, turning over the family company to sons Louis and Charles, who served as co-directors. In 1917, the Louis Dreyfus Group was forced out of Russia by the Russian Revolution catalyzing their international expansion. During World War I, the firm expanded into the maritime arms trade supplying the belligerents to war. In 1924, they expanded to South Africa and in the 1920s and 1930s built up their own shipping company, LD Lines. Known as the "King of Wheat," the Dreyfus Group dominated the grain trade through the Great Depression and up to the outbreak of World War II purchasing grain at low cost in producing countries and selling at a higher price in countries that had shortages.

Louis-Dreyfus and his brother were shareholders in the French Communist paper l'Humanité.

The Legion of Honour was bestowed on him by the French government in 1923.

== Death ==
Louis-Dreyfus died at his home in the Paris suburb of Ville-d'Avray on July 30, 1929.

== Personal life ==
In 1904, he married Sarah Germaine Hément (1882-1964); they had four children: Eliane Heilbronn (1906–1995), Pierre Louis-Dreyfus (1908–2011), François Louis-Dreyfus (1909–1958), and Arlette Louis-Dreyfus (1911–2001). After Louis-Dreyfus's death in 1929, his brother Louis took over the family company.
