= Mahatma Gandhi Series =

Series of Indian banknotes

Banknotes of denominations of ₹5, ₹10, ₹20, ₹50, ₹100, ₹500 and ₹1000 of the Mahatma Gandhi Series

The Gandhi Series of banknotes are issued by the Reserve Bank of India (RBI) as the legal tender of Indian rupee. The series is so called because the obverse of the banknotes prominently display the portrait of Mahatma Gandhi. Since its introduction in 1996, this series replaced all Lion Capital Series banknotes issued before 1996. The Reserve Bank of India (RBI) introduced the series in 1996 with ₹10 and ₹500 banknotes.

As of 10 November 2016, the RBI issues banknotes in this series in denominations from ₹5 to ₹100. Printing of five-notes, which had stopped earlier, restarted in 2009. On 8 November 2016, the ₹500 and ₹1000 banknote denominations of this series were demonetised and the new Mahatma Gandhi Series of banknotes were revealed in denominations of ₹500 and ₹2000, intended to replace this series.

== Security features ==
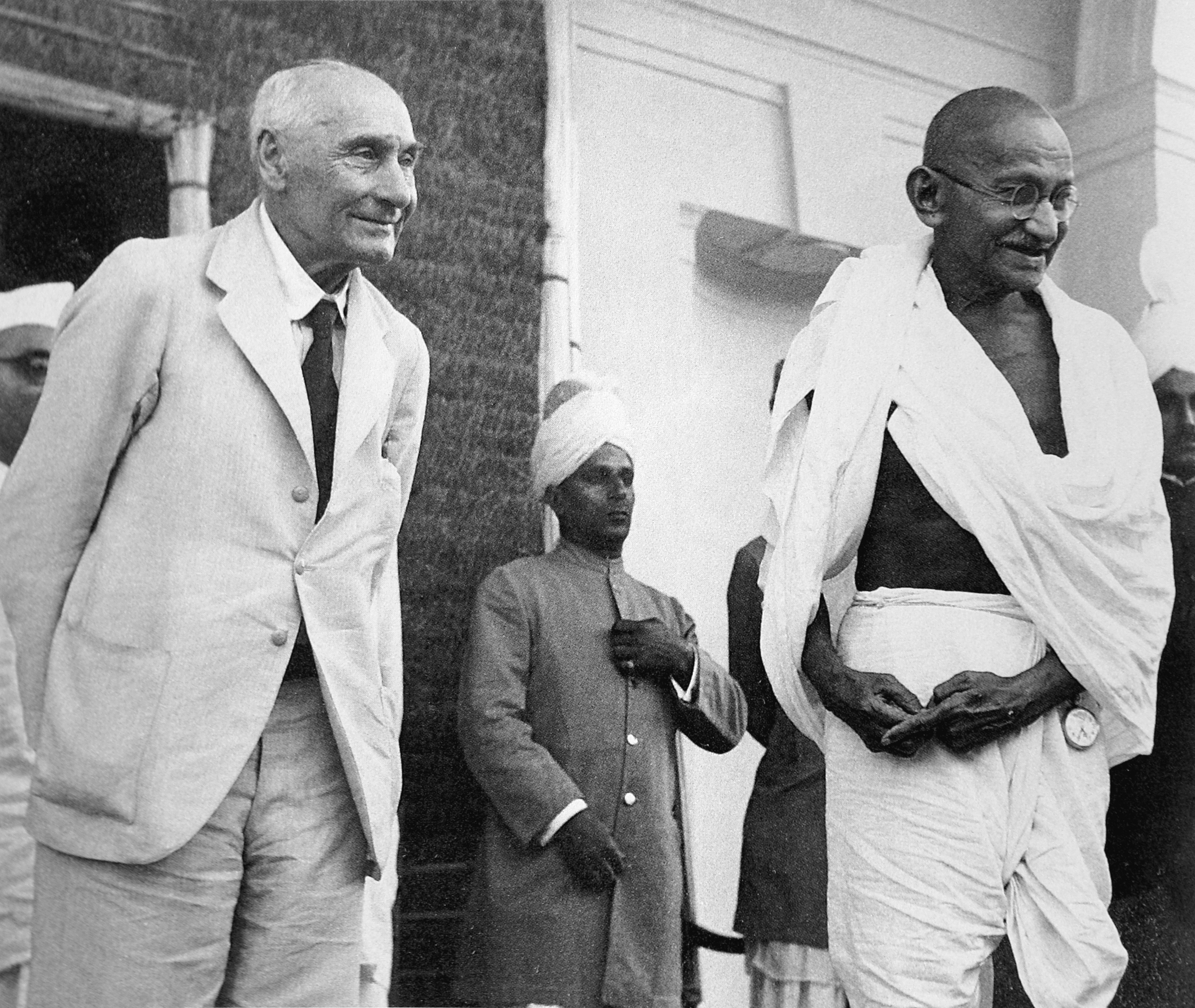
The obverse design of the series was based on this 1946 photograph of Mahatma Gandhi and Lord Pethick-Lawrence.

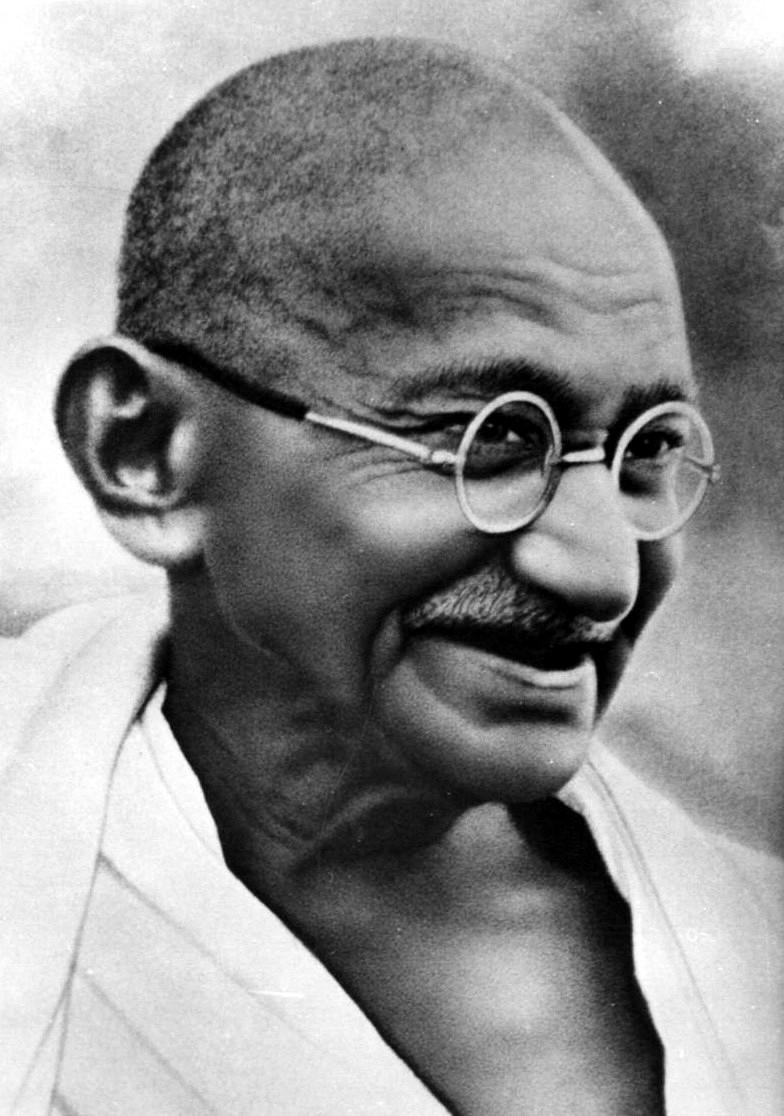
Details of the photograph

The following features are included in the notes.

- Security thread: The notes contain an embedded security thread that can be seen as a vertical straight line when held against a light source. The notes contains the words 'Bharat' in Devanagari and RBI. The ₹1000 denomination contains the number 1000 as well. Older notes, however, are not readable.
- Latent image: When held against the light at an angle of 45 degrees, an inscription of the value of the denomination is seen on the right side of Mahatma Gandhi's image.
- Microlettering: Micro-letters are used to print RBI on ₹10 notes, and the value of the denomination on other notes.
- Intaglio print:
1. An intaglio (raised) shape is present on all denominations other than the ₹10 note to help the visually impaired.
  1. ₹20-Vertical rectangle
  2. ₹50-Square
  3. ₹100-Triangle
  4. ₹500-Circle
  5. ₹1,000-Diamond
2. The image of Mahatma Gandhi, Reserve Bank of India seal, clause of guarantee, Ashoka Pillar emblem and signature of the governor of the Reserve Bank of India are all intaglio prints.
- Fluorescence: The number panels are printed with fluorescent ink.
- Optical fibre: The notes have optical fibres that glow when exposed to ultra-violet light.
- Optically variable ink: Denominations of ₹500 and ₹1000 are printed with ink that changes color with the angle of placement to light.
- See-through registration device – A floral design (later issues now have the corresponding denomination) printed on the front and the back of the note coincides and perfectly overlap each other when viewed against a light source.
- EURion constellation – A pattern of symbols found on the banknote helps software detect the presence of a banknote in a digital image so that it can prevent its reproduction with devices such as color photocopiers.
- Angular lines: A series of lines placed on both the left and right side of the ₹100, ₹500 and ₹1,000 notes. They are only featured on the 2015 series notes, and are utilised to help those with visual impairments in identifying the notes.
- Novel numbering: A set of six digit serial numbers that increase in size from left to right. Issued for the 2015 and 2016 series ₹20, ₹50, ₹100, ₹500 and ₹1,000 notes.

== Banknotes ==
Mahatma Gandhi Series
Image		Value	Dimensions (millimetres)	Main colour	Description			Date of	
Obverse	Reverse	Value	Dimensions (millimetres)	Main colour	Obverse	Reverse	Watermark	Issue	Withdrawal
		₹5	117 × 63 mm	Green	Mahatma Gandhi	Agriculture endeavour	Mahatma Gandhi	2002 / 2011	Current
		₹10	137 × 63 mm	Orange and violet	Mahatma Gandhi	Indian rhinoceros, Indian elephant, and Bengal tiger	Mahatma Gandhi	1996 / 2017	Current
		₹20	147 × 63 mm	Red-orange	Mahatma Gandhi	Mount Harriet	Mahatma Gandhi	2001 / 2018	Current
		₹50	147 × 73 mm	Lilac and Violet	Mahatma Gandhi	Parliament House	Mahatma Gandhi	1997 / 2017	Current
		₹100	157 × 73 mm	Blue and green at centre, brown and purple at two sides	Mahatma Gandhi	Kangchenjunga	Mahatma Gandhi	1996 / 2017	Current
		₹500	167 × 73 mm	Orange and Yellow	Mahatma Gandhi	Gyarah Murti	Mahatma Gandhi	2000 / 2016	8 November 2016
		₹1000	177 × 73 mm	Amber-Red	Mahatma Gandhi	Economy of India	Mahatma Gandhi	2000 / 2016	8 November 2016
These images are to scale at 0.7 pixel per millimetre (18 pixel per inch). For table standards, see the banknote specification table.

=== Languages ===
Each banknote has its amount written in 17 languages. On the obverse, the denomination is written in Hindi and English. On the reverse is a language panel which displays the denomination of the note in 15 of the 22 official languages of India. The languages are displayed in alphabetical order. Languages included on the panel are Assamese, Bengali, Gujarati, Kannada, Kashmiri, Konkani, Malayalam, Marathi, Nepali, Odia, Punjabi, Sanskrit, Tamil, Telugu and Urdu.

Denominations in union level official languages (At below either ends)
Language	₹5	₹10	₹20	₹50	₹100	₹500	₹1000
English	Five rupees	Ten rupees	Twenty rupees	Fifty rupees	One hundred rupees	Five hundred rupees	One thousand rupees
Hindi	पाँच रुपये	दस रुपये	बीस रुपये	पचास रुपये	एक सौ रुपये	पांच सौ रुपये	एक हज़ार रुपये
Denominations in 15 state level/other official languages (As seen on the language panel)
Assamese	পাঁচ টকা	দহ টকা	বিছ টকা	পঞ্চাশ টকা	এশ টকা	পাঁচশ টকা	এহেজাৰ টকা
Bengali	পাঁচ টাকা	দশ টাকা	কুড়ি টাকা	পঞ্চাশ টাকা	একশ টাকা	পাঁচশ টাকা	এক হাজার টাকা
Gujarati	પાંચ રૂપિયા	દસ રૂપિયા	વીસ રૂપિયા	પચાસ રૂપિયા	સો રૂપિયા	પાંચ સો રૂપિયા	એક હજાર રૂપિયા
Kannada	ಐದು ರೂಪಾಯಿಗಳು	ಹತ್ತು ರೂಪಾಯಿಗಳು	ಇಪ್ಪತ್ತು ರೂಪಾಯಿಗಳು	ಐವತ್ತು ರೂಪಾಯಿಗಳು	ಒಂದು ನೂರು ರೂಪಾಯಿಗಳು	ಐದು ನೂರು ರೂಪಾಯಿಗಳು	ಒಂದು ಸಾವಿರ ರೂಪಾಯಿಗಳು
Kashmiri	پانٛژھ رۄپیہِ	دٔہ رۄپیہِ	وُہ رۄپیہِ	پَنٛژاہ رۄپیہِ	ہَتھ رۄپیہِ	پانٛژھ ہَتھ رۄپیہِ	ساس رۄپیہِ
Konkani	पांच रुपया	धा रुपया	वीस रुपया	पन्नास रुपया	शंबर रुपया	पाचशें रुपया	एक हजार रुपया
Malayalam	അഞ്ചു രൂപ	പത്തു രൂപ	ഇരുപതു രൂപ	അൻപതു രൂപ	നൂറു രൂപ	അഞ്ഞൂറു രൂപ	ആയിരം രൂപ
Marathi	पाच रुपये	दहा रुपये	वीस रुपये	पन्नास रुपये	शंभर रुपये	पाचशे रुपये	एक हजार रुपये
Nepali	पाँच रुपियाँ	दस रुपियाँ	बीस रुपियाँ	पचास रुपियाँ	एक सय रुपियाँ	पाँच सय रुपियाँ	एक हजार रुपियाँ
Odia	ପାଞ୍ଚ ଟଙ୍କା	ଦଶ ଟଙ୍କା	କୋଡିଏ ଟଙ୍କା	ପଚାଶ ଟଙ୍କା	ଏକ ଶତ ଟଙ୍କା	ପାଞ୍ଚ ଶତ ଟଙ୍କା	ଏକ ହଜାର ଟଙ୍କା
Punjabi	ਪੰਜ ਰੁਪਏ	ਦਸ ਰੁਪਏ	ਵੀਹ ਰੁਪਏ	ਪੰਜਾਹ ਰੁਪਏ	ਇਕ ਸੌ ਰੁਪਏ	ਪੰਜ ਸੌ ਰੁਪਏ	ਇਕ ਹਜ਼ਾਰ ਰੁਪਏ
Sanskrit	पञ्चरूप्यकाणि	दशरूप्यकाणि	विंशती रूप्यकाणि	पञ्चाशत् रूप्यकाणि	शतं रूप्यकाणि	पञ्चशतं रूप्यकाणि	सहस्रं रूप्यकाणि
Tamil	ஐந்து ரூபாய்	பத்து ரூபாய்	இருபது ரூபாய்	ஐம்பது ரூபாய்	நூறு ரூபாய்	ஐந்நூறு ரூபாய்	ஆயிரம் ரூபாய்
Telugu	ఐదు రూపాయలు	పది రూపాయలు	ఇరవై రూపాయలు	ఏబది రూపాయలు	నూరు రూపాయలు	ఐదువందల రూపాయలు	వెయ్యి రూపాయలు
Urdu	پانچ روپیے	دس روپیے	بیس روپیے	پچاس روپیے	سو روپیے	پانچ سو روپیے	ایک ہزار روپیے

== See also ==
- Lion Capital Series
- Mahatma Gandhi New Series
- List of artistic depictions of Mahatma Gandhi
