= Lion Capital =

Lion Capital may refer to:

== Architecture ==
- The Lion Capital of Ashoka, a sculpture used as the national emblem of India
- Mathura lion capital, an Indo-Scythian sandstone capital from Mathura in India

== Companies ==
- Lion Capital LLP, a British private equity firm formerly affiliated with Hicks Muse Tate & Furst
- Lion Capital, a former affiliate of Apollo Global Management

== Other ==
- Lion Capital Series of banknotes were currency notes issued after Indian independence
