= Mahatma Gandhi New Series =

Series of Indian banknotes

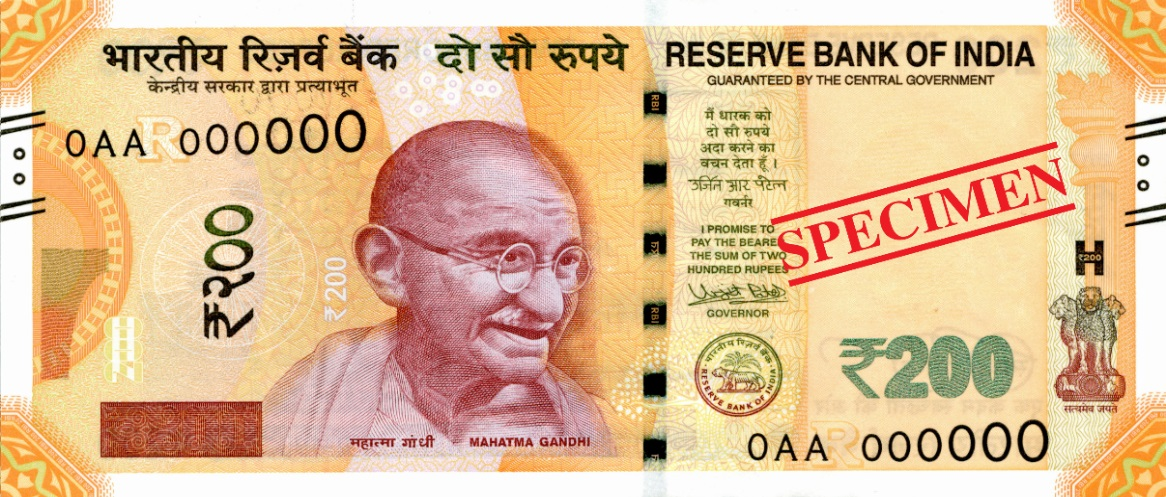
Indian 200-rupee note issued in 2017

The Mahatma Gandhi New Series of banknotes are issued by the Reserve Bank of India (RBI) as the legal tender of the Indian rupee (₹), intended to replace the Mahatma Gandhi Series of banknotes. Announced on 8 November 2016, it followed the demonetisation of ₹500 and ₹1000 banknotes of the original Mahatma Gandhi Series. Similar to the preceding series of banknotes, the obverse of the Mahatma Gandhi New Series banknotes also prominently displays the portrait of Mahatma Gandhi. The logo of Swachh Bharat Abhiyan is also printed on the back of the banknotes of this series.

== History ==
The first banknotes issued in the New Series were the denominations of ₹500 and ₹2000, and are in circulation since 10 November 2016. While the ₹500 note is still being printed, the ₹2000 note was last issued date 2017.

The RBI announced on 18 August 2017 that it would soon issue a new ₹50 note. The RBI announced the specifications of the new denomination of the ₹200 note in the Mahatma Gandhi New Series, bearing the signature of Dr. Urjit R. Patel, Governor of the Reserve Bank of India, on 25 August 2017.

The Reserve Bank of India has also issued ₹10 denomination banknotes in the Mahatma Gandhi New Series. The new denomination has on the reverse a motif of the Sun Temple in Konark, depicting the country's cultural heritage. The base colour of the note is Chocolate brown.

The RBI announced on 19 July 2018 that it would shortly issue a new ₹100 note. The new denomination has on the reverse a motif of the Rani Ki Vav (the Queen's Stepwell), a UNESCO World Heritage site in Patan in Gujarat, depicting India's cultural heritage. The base colour of the note is Lavender.

The Reserve Bank of India announced on 26 April 2019 that it would shortly issue a new ₹20 note. The new denomination has on the reverse a motif of Ellora Caves, a UNESCO World Heritage site in Aurangabad district, Maharashtra, depicting India's cultural heritage, continuing with the theme in the Mahatma Gandhi New Series banknotes.

In May 2023, the Reserve Bank of India announced its decision to withdraw the ₹2,000 notes from circulation. Until 30 September 2023 they could be exchanged (to a maximum of 20,000 ₹ in any single transaction) or deposited in bank accounts. Despite these measures, the notes remain legal tender.

== Security features ==
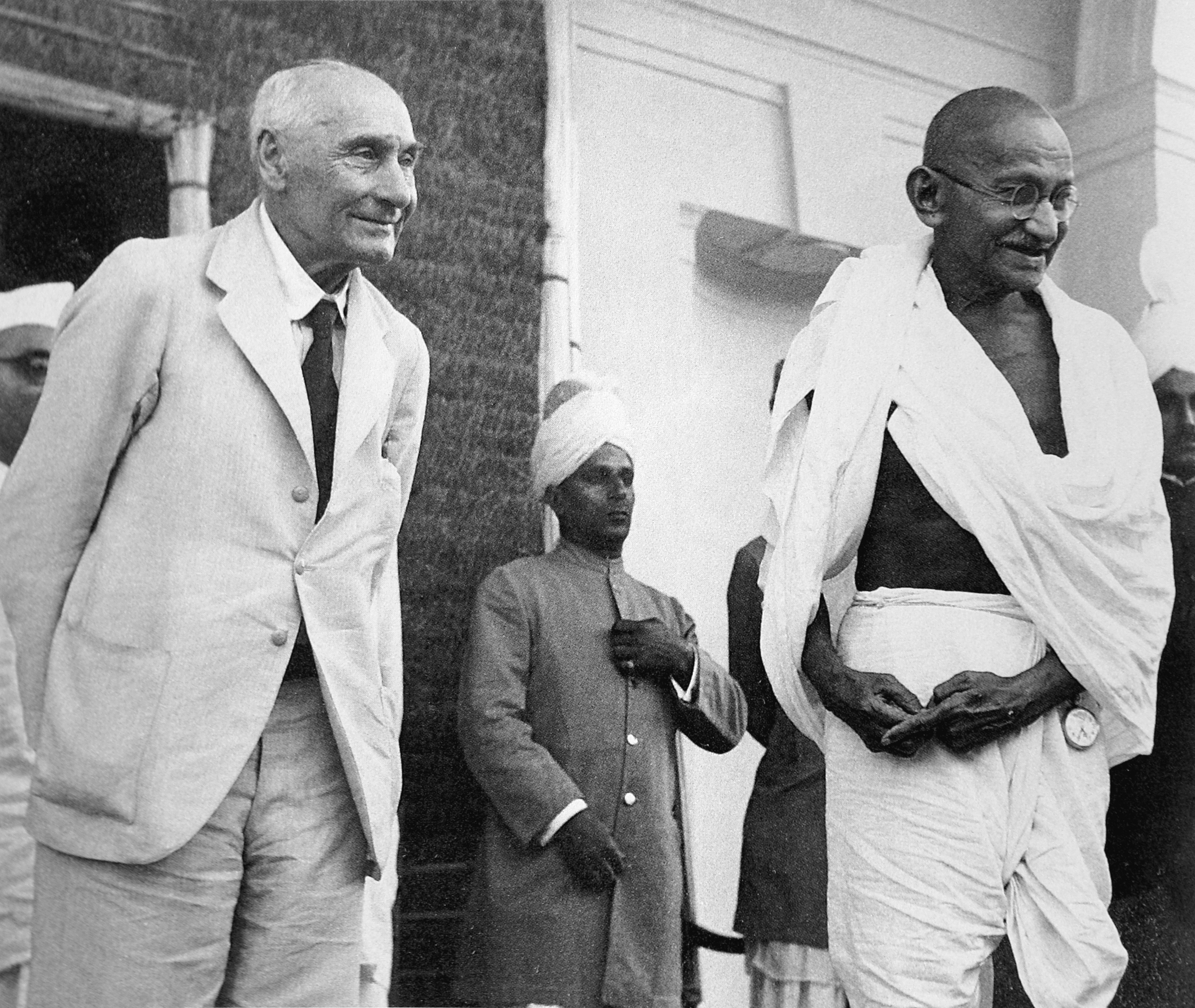
The obverse design of the series was based on this 1946 photograph of Gandhi and Lord Pethick-Lawrence.

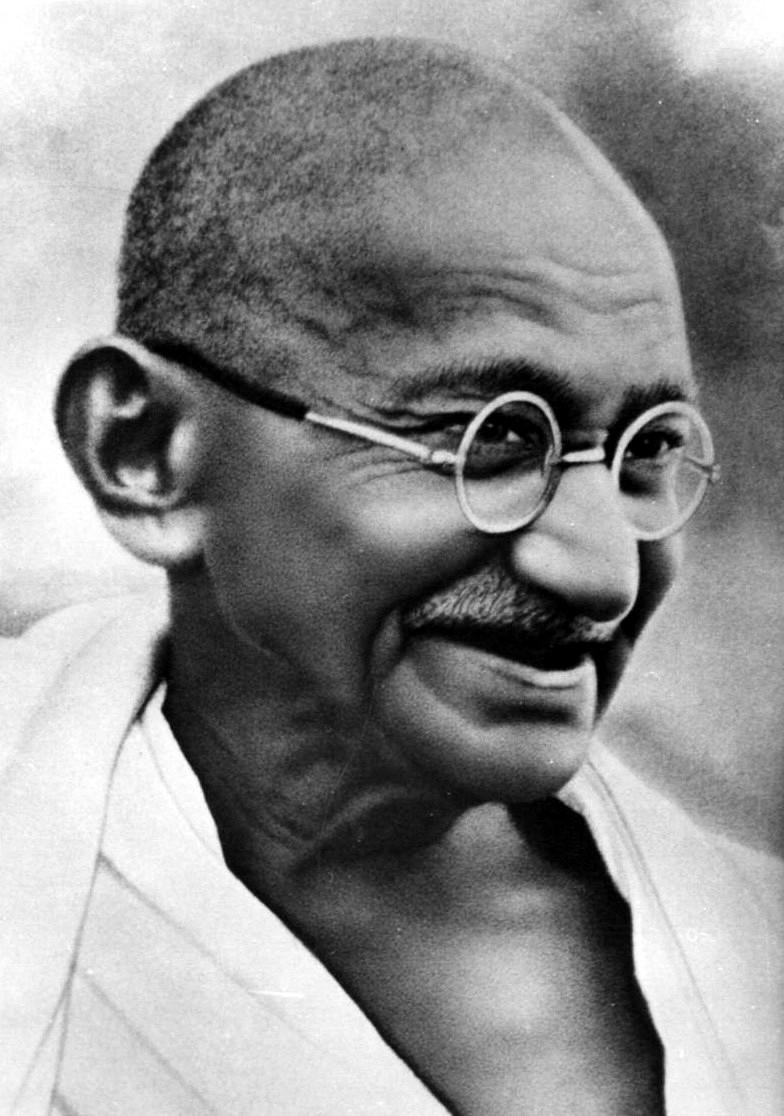
Details of the photograph.

The security features of the Mahatma Gandhi New Series banknotes are as follows:

- See-through registration device: Consisting of the numeral denomination at the lower left part of the notes on the front and at the lower right of the notes on the back. Used for the ₹10, ₹20, ₹50, ₹100, ₹200,₹500 and ₹2000.
- Novel numbering: A set of six digit serial numbers that increase in size from left to right. These serial numbers are located on the top left and bottom right side on the front of the notes.
- Latent image: Located on the lower left part of the note's front, when tilted, the denomination is seen within the panel near the left side of the portrait of Mahatma Gandhi. Used for the ₹10, ₹20, ₹50, ₹100, ₹200, ₹500 and ₹2000.
- Denominational numeral: Located on the left side of the front of the notes, the denominational number is rendered in Devanagari script (₹१०, ₹२०, ₹५०, ₹१००, ₹२००, ₹५०० and ₹२०००). This raised some controversies.
- Microprinting: Microprinted elements consisting of the letters "RBI" and its corresponding denominations are located on the left side of the note. Used on the ₹10, ₹20, ₹50, ₹100, ₹200, ₹500 and ₹2000 notes.
- Intaglio printing of the portrait of Mahatma Gandhi.
- Windowed security thread: Located on the front of the notes, the windowed security thread on the ₹10, ₹20, ₹50, ₹100, ₹200, ₹500 and ₹2000 notes contain colour-shifting elements and inscriptions of India in Hindi. When the notes are tilted, the colour of the security threads changes from green to blue.
- Angular lines: A series of lines placed on both the left and right side of the front of the notes, these angular lines are utilized to help those with visual impairments in identifying the notes. Used on the ₹100, ₹200, ₹500 and ₹2000 notes.

== Banknotes ==
Mahatma Gandhi (New) Series
Image		Value	Dimensions (millimetres)	Main colour	Description			Date of Issue	Date of Withdrawal	Year
Obverse	Reverse	Value	Dimensions (millimetres)	Main colour	Obverse	Reverse	Watermark	Date of Issue	Date of Withdrawal	Year
		₹10	123 mm × 63 mm	Chocolate brown	Mahatma Gandhi	Sun Temple, Konark, Odisha	Mahatma Gandhi and electrotype denomination	5 January 2018	Current	2017-
		₹20	129 mm × 63 mm	Greenish Yellow	Mahatma Gandhi	Ellora Caves, Verul, Maharashtra	Mahatma Gandhi and electrotype denomination	26 April 2019	Current	2019-
		₹50	135 mm × 66 mm	Fluorescent Blue	Mahatma Gandhi	Hampi with Chariot, Karnataka	Mahatma Gandhi and electrotype denomination	18 August 2017	Current	2017-
		₹100	142 mm × 66 mm	Lavender	Mahatma Gandhi	Rani Ki Vav, Gujarat	Mahatma Gandhi and electrotype denomination	19 July 2018	Current	2018-
		₹200	146 mm × 66 mm	Bright Yellow	Mahatma Gandhi	Sanchi Stupa, Madhya Pradesh	Mahatma Gandhi and electrotype denomination	25 August 2017	Current	2017-
		₹500	150 mm × 66 mm	Stone Grey	Mahatma Gandhi	Red Fort, Delhi	Mahatma Gandhi and electrotype denomination	10 November 2016	Current	2016-
		₹2000	166 mm × 66 mm	Magenta	Mahatma Gandhi	Mangalyaan	Mahatma Gandhi and electrotype denomination	10 November 2016	30 September 2023	2016-
For table standards, see the banknote specification table.

=== Languages ===
Each banknote has its amount written in 17 languages. On the obverse, the denomination is written in English and Hindi. On the reverse is a language panel that displays the denomination of the note in 15 of the 22 official languages of India. The languages are displayed in alphabetical order. Languages included on the panel are Assamese, Bengali, Gujarati, Kannada, Kashmiri, Konkani, Malayalam, Marathi, Nepali, Odia, Punjabi, Sanskrit, Tamil, Telugu and Urdu.

Denominations in union level official languages (At below either ends)
Language	₹10	₹20	₹50	₹100	₹200	₹500	₹2000
English	Ten rupees	Twenty rupees	Fifty rupees	One Hundred rupees	Two hundred rupees	Five hundred rupees	Two thousand rupees
Hindi	दस रुपये	बीस रुपये	पचास रुपये	एक सौ रुपये	दो सौ रुपये	पाँच सौ रुपये	दो हज़ार रुपये
Denominations in 15 state level/other official languages (As seen on the language panel)
Assamese	দহ টকা	বিছ টকা	পঞ্চাশ টকা	এশ টকা	দুইশ টকা	পাঁচশ টকা	দুহেজাৰ টকা
Bengali	দশ টাকা	কুড়ি টাকা	পঞ্চাশ টাকা	একশ টাকা	দুইশ টাকা	পাঁচশ টাকা	দুই হাজার টাকা
Gujarati	દસ રૂપિયા	વીસ રૂપિયા	પચાસ રૂપિયા	એક સો રૂપિયા	બસો રૂપિયા	પાંચ સો રૂપિયા	બે હજાર રૂપિયા
Kannada	ಹತ್ತು ರೂಪಾಯಿಗಳು	ಇಪ್ಪತ್ತು ರೂಪಾಯಿಗಳು	ಐವತ್ತು ರೂಪಾಯಿಗಳು	ನೂರು ರೂಪಾಯಿಗಳು	ಎರಡು ನೂರು ರೂಪಾಯಿಗಳು	ಐದು ನೂರು ರೂಪಾಯಿಗಳು	ಎರಡು ಸಾವಿರ ರೂಪಾಯಿಗಳು
Kashmiri	دٔہ رۄپیہِ	وُہ رۄپیہِ	پَنٛژاہ رۄپیہِ	ہَتھ رۄپیہِ	زٕ ہَتھ رۄپیہِ	پانٛژھ ہَتھ رۄپیہِ	زٕ ساس رۄپیہِ
Konkani	धा रुपया	वीस रुपया	पन्नास रुपया	शंबर रुपया	दोनशें रुपया	पाचशें रुपया	दोन हजार रुपया
Malayalam	പത്തു രൂപ	ഇരുപതു രൂപ	അൻപതു രൂപ	നൂറു രൂപ	ഇരുന്നൂറു രൂപ	അഞ്ഞൂറു രൂപ	രണ്ടായിരം രൂപ
Marathi	दहा रुपये	वीस रुपये	पन्नास रुपये	शंभर रुपये	दोनशे रुपये	पाचशे रुपये	दोन हजार रुपये
Nepali	दस रुपियाँ	बीस रुपियाँ	पचास रुपियाँ	एक सय रुपियाँ	दुई सय रुपियाँ	पाँच सय रुपियाँ	दुई हजार रुपियाँ
Odia	ଦଶ ଟଙ୍କା	କୋଡ଼ିଏ ଟଙ୍କା	ପଚାଶ ଟଙ୍କା	ଏକ ଶତ ଟଙ୍କା	ଦୁଇ ଶହ ଟଙ୍କା	ପାଞ୍ଚ ଶତ ଟଙ୍କା	ଦୁଇ ହଜାର ଟଙ୍କା
Punjabi	ਦਸ ਰੁਪਏ	ਵੀਹ ਰੁਪਏ	ਪੰਜਾਹ ਰੁਪਏ	ਇਕ ਸੌ ਰੁਪਏ	ਦੋ ਸੌ ਰੁਪਏ	ਪੰਜ ਸੌ ਰੁਪਏ	ਦੋ ਹਜ਼ਾਰ ਰੁਪਏ
Sanskrit	दश रूप्यकाणि	विंशती रूप्यकाणि	पञ्चाशत् रूप्यकाणि	शतं रूप्यकाणि	द्विशतं रूप्यकाणि	पञ्चशतं रूप्यकाणि	द्विसहस्रं रूप्यकाणि
Tamil	பத்து ரூபாய்	இருபது ரூபாய்	ஐம்பது ரூபாய்	நூறு ரூபாய்	இருநூறு ரூபாய்	ஐந்நூறு ரூபாய்	இரண்டாயிரம் ரூபாய்
Telugu	పది రూపాయలు	ఇరవై రూపాయలు	యాభై రూపాయలు	వంద రూపాయలు	రెండు వందల రూపాయలు	ఐదువందల రూపాయలు	రెండు వేల రూపాయలు
Urdu	دس روپیے	بیس روپیے	پچاس روپیے	سو روپیے	دو سو روپیے	پانچ سو روپیے	دو ہزار روپیے

== See also ==
- Lion Capital Series
- Mahatma Gandhi Series
- List of artistic depictions of Mahatma Gandhi
