= Indian 50-rupee note =

Denomination of the Indian rupee

Fifty rupees
- Country: India
- Value: ₹50 (approx. $0.67)
- Width: 135 mm
- Height: 66 mm
- Security features: Security thread, latent image, micro-lettering, intaglio print, fluorescent ink, watermark, and see through registration device.
- Years of printing: August 2017 - present

Obverse
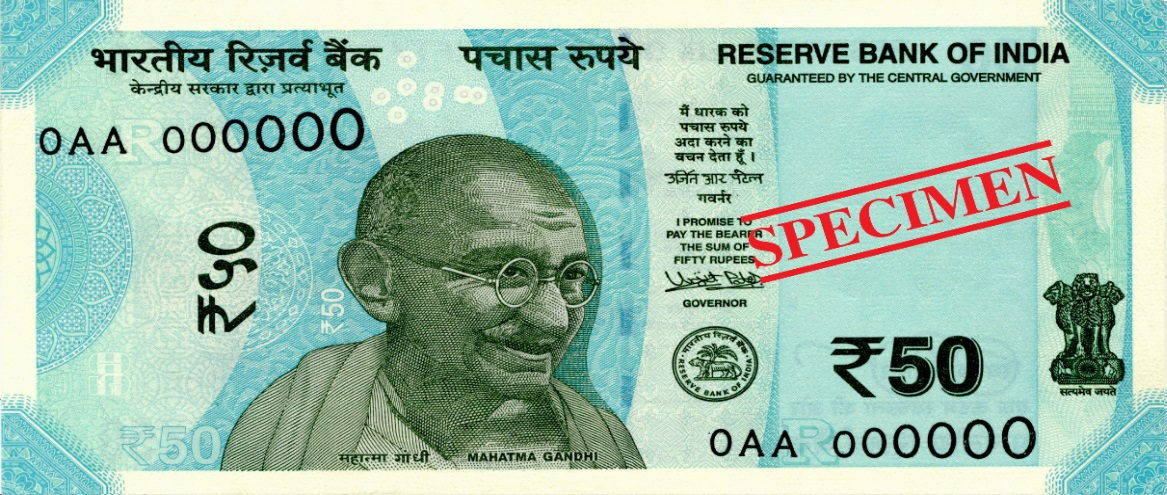
- Design: Mahatma Gandhi
- Designer: Reserve Bank of India
- Design date: 2017

Reverse
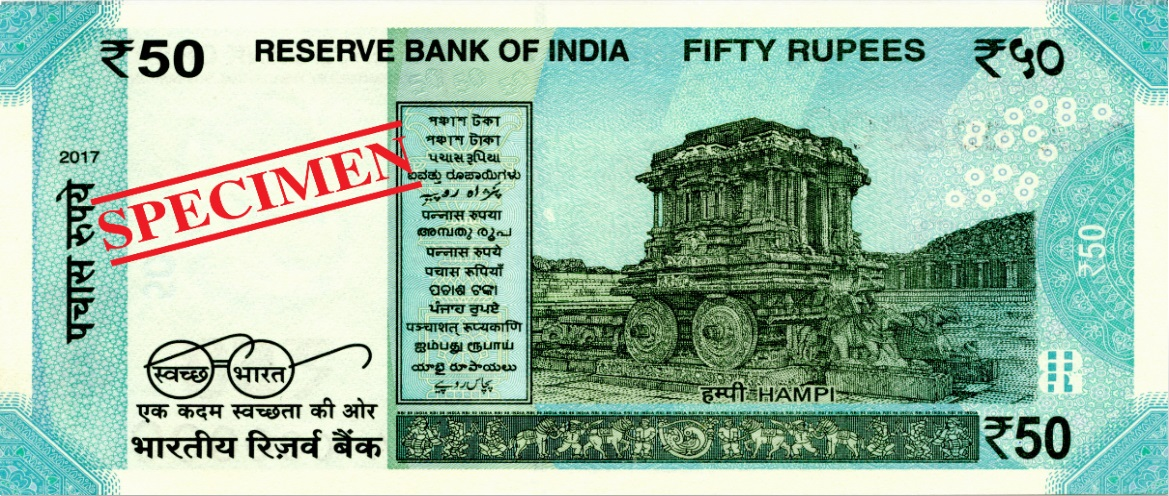
- Design: Hampi with Chariot
- Designer: Reserve Bank of India
- Design date: 2017

The Indian 50-rupee banknote (₹50) is a denomination of the Indian rupee. The present ₹50 banknote in circulation is a part of the Mahatma Gandhi New Series of banknotes. However, ₹50 banknotes of the previous series (Mahatma Gandhi Series and Lion Capital Series) will continue to be legal tender.

The ₹50 banknote denomination was first introduced by the Reserve Bank of India (RBI) in 1975 as a part of the Lion Capital Series, which had the Ashoka pillar on the banknote. It was replaced by a watermark of Mahatma Gandhi in the Mahatma Gandhi Series, in 1996.

== Mahatma Gandhi Ji New Series ==
On 10 November 2016, the Reserve Bank of India announced, a new redesigned ₹50 banknote was to be available as a part of the Mahatma Gandhi New Series. On 18 August 2017, the Reserve Bank of India introduced a new ₹50 banknote in the Mahatma Gandhi (New) Series. However, ₹50 banknotes of the previous series will continue to be legal tender.

=== Design ===
The new version of the note has a depiction of Hampi with Chariot on the reverse, depicting the country's cultural heritage. The base colour of the note is Fluorescent Blue ( As per RBI's official website ). The note has other designs, geometric patterns aligning with the overall colour scheme, both at the obverse and reverse. The dimensions of the banknote are measured at 135 mm × 66 mm.

== History ==
=== Lion capital series ===
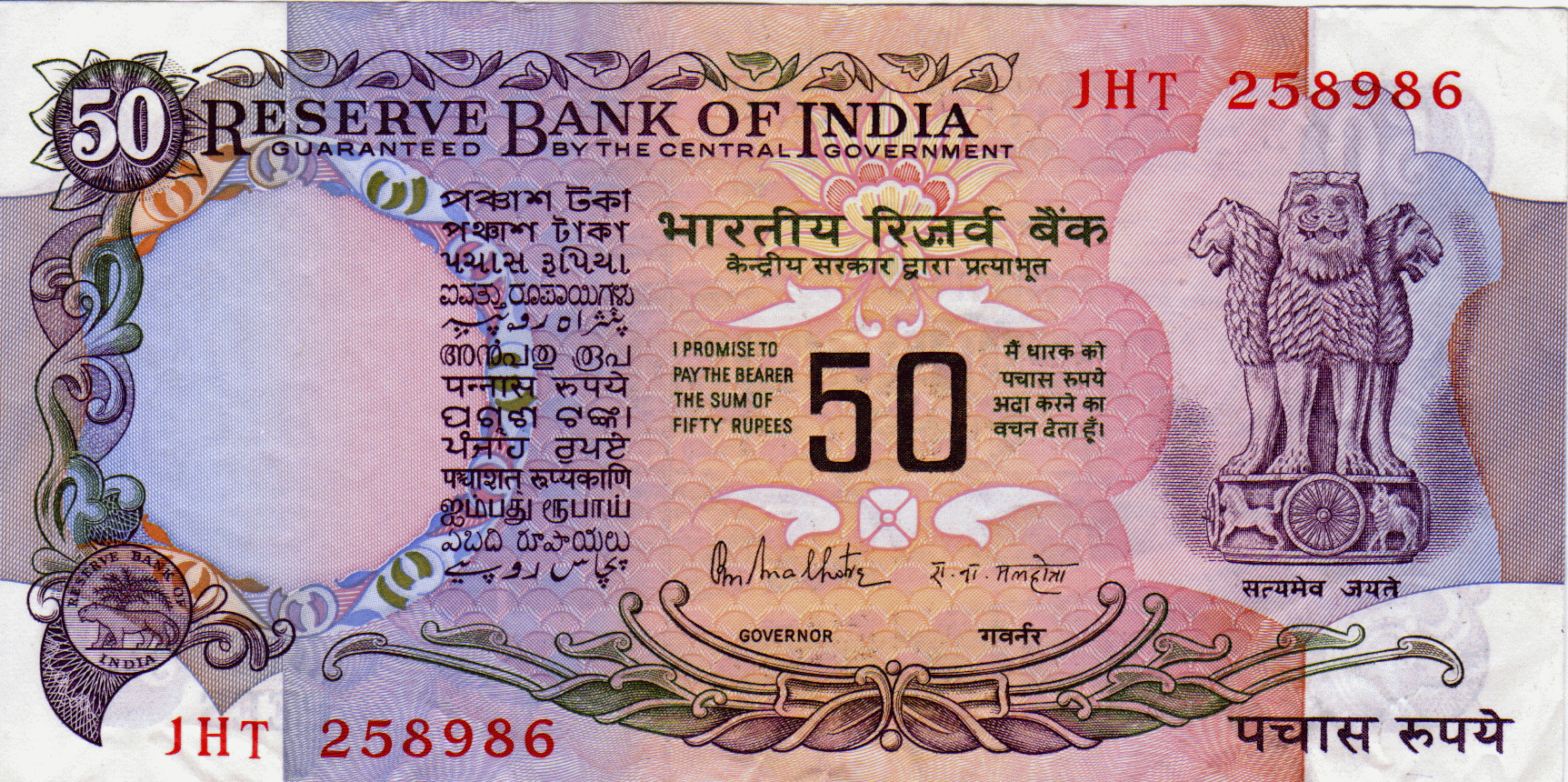
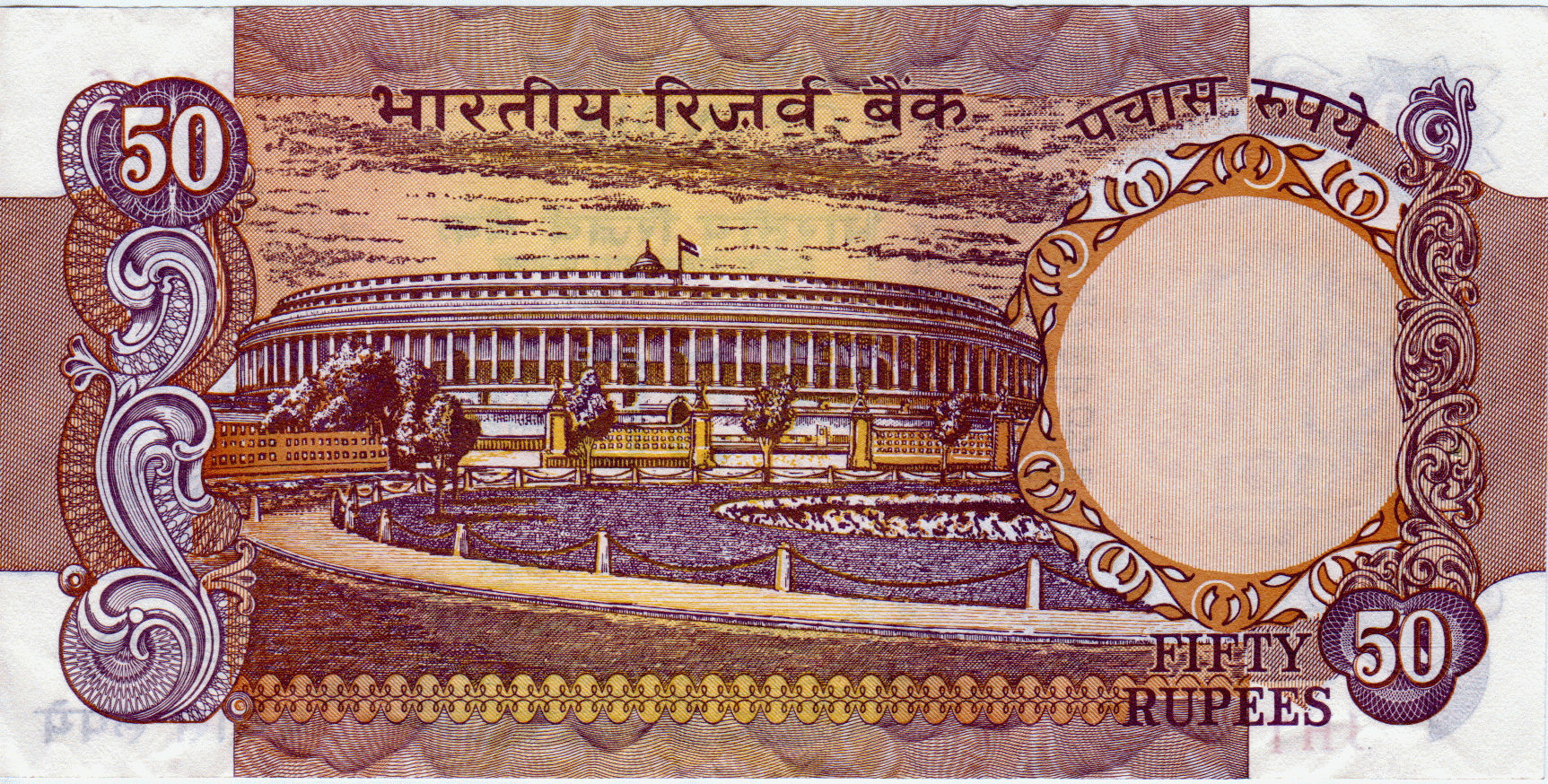
India 50-rupee, 1981

The ₹50 banknote in the Lion capital series was the highest denomination.

==== Design ====
The obverse design included the Lion Capital. The reverse design included an image of the Old Parliament House.

=== Mahatma Gandhi Series ===
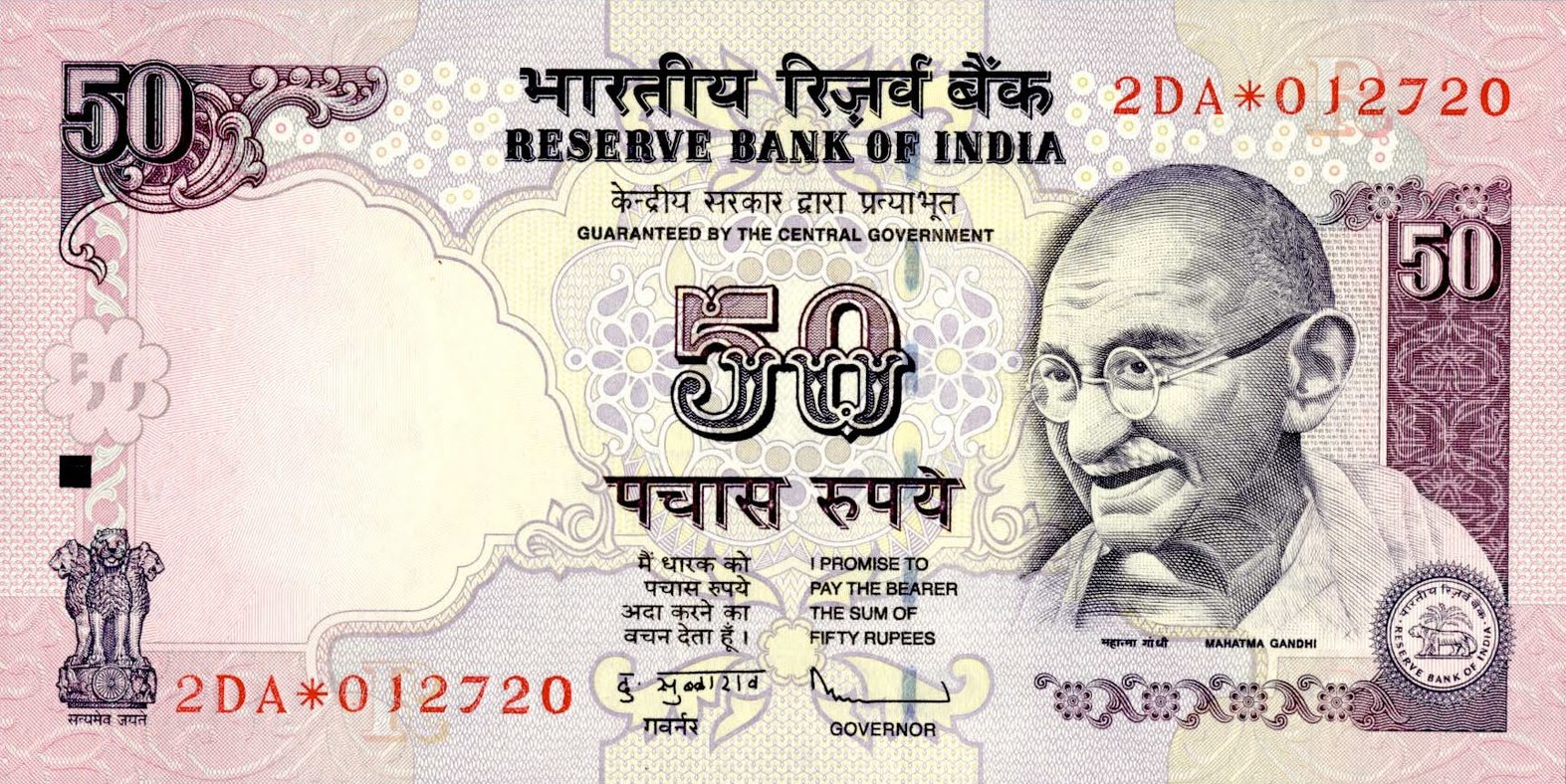
India 50 INR, MG series, 2011, obverse

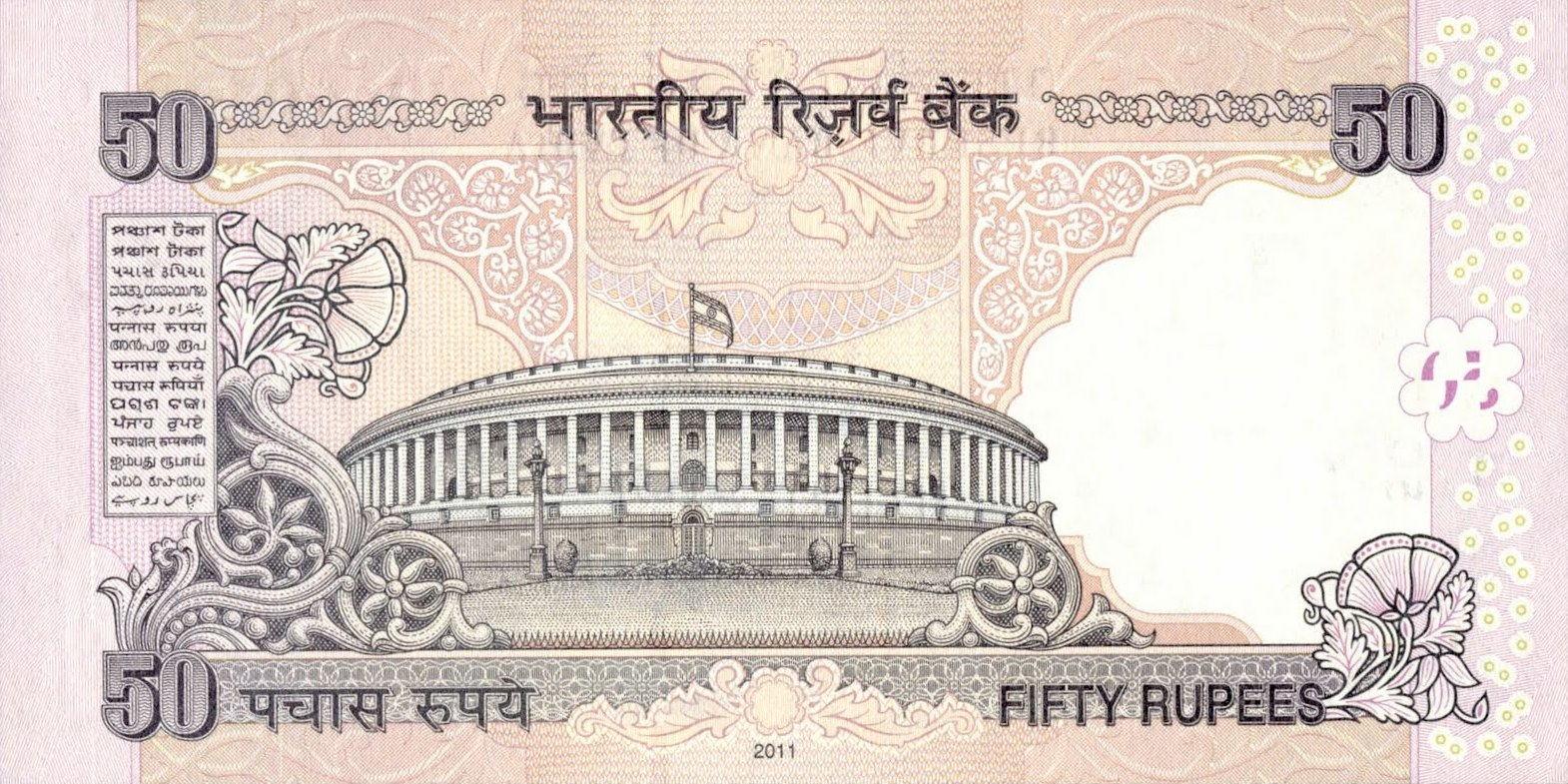
India 50 INR, MG series, 2011, reverse

==== Design ====
As of 2012, the new ₹ sign has been incorporated in revised versions of the ₹50 note. In January 2014 RBI announced that it would be withdrawing from circulation all banknotes printed prior to 2005 by 31 March 2014. The deadline was later extended to 1 January 2015, then to 30 June 2016.

==== Security features ====
The security features of the ₹50 banknote includes:

- A windowed security thread that reads 'भारत' (Bharat in the Devanagari script) and 'RBI' alternately.
- Latent image of the value of the banknote on the vertical band next to the right hand side of Mahatma Gandhi's portrait.
- Watermark of Gandhi that is a mirror image of the main portrait.
- The number panel of the banknote is printed in embedded fluorescent fibers and optically variable ink.
- Since 2005 additional security features like machine-readable security thread, electrotype watermark, and year of print appears on the bank note.

== Languages ==
Like the other Indian rupee banknotes, the ₹50 banknote has its amount written in 17 languages. On the obverse, the denomination is written in English and Hindi. On the reverse is a language panel which displays the denomination of the note in 15 of the 22 official languages of India. The languages are displayed in alphabetical order. Languages included on the panel are Assamese, Bengali, Gujarati, Kannada, Kashmiri, Konkani, Malayalam, Marathi, Nepali, Odia, Punjabi, Sanskrit, Tamil, Telugu and Urdu.

Denominations in central level official languages (At below either ends)
Language	₹50
English	Fifty rupees
Hindi	पचास रुपये
Denominations in 15 state level/other official languages (As seen on the language panel)
Assamese	পঞ্চাশ টকা
Bengali	পঞ্চাশ টাকা
Gujarati	પચાસ રૂપિયા
Kannada	ಐವತ್ತು ರುಪಾಯಿಗಳು
Kashmiri	پَنٛژاہ رۄپیہِ
Konkani	पन्नास रुपया
Malayalam	അൻപതു രൂപ
Marathi	पन्नास रुपये
Nepali	पचास रुपियाँ
Odia	ପଚାଶ ଟଙ୍କା
Punjabi	ਪੰਜਾਹ ਰੁਪਏ
Sanskrit	पञ्चाशत् रूप्यकाणि
Tamil	ஐம்பது ரூபாய்
Telugu	యాభై రూపాయలు
Urdu	پچاس روپیے
