= Lion Capital Series =

Series of Indian banknotes

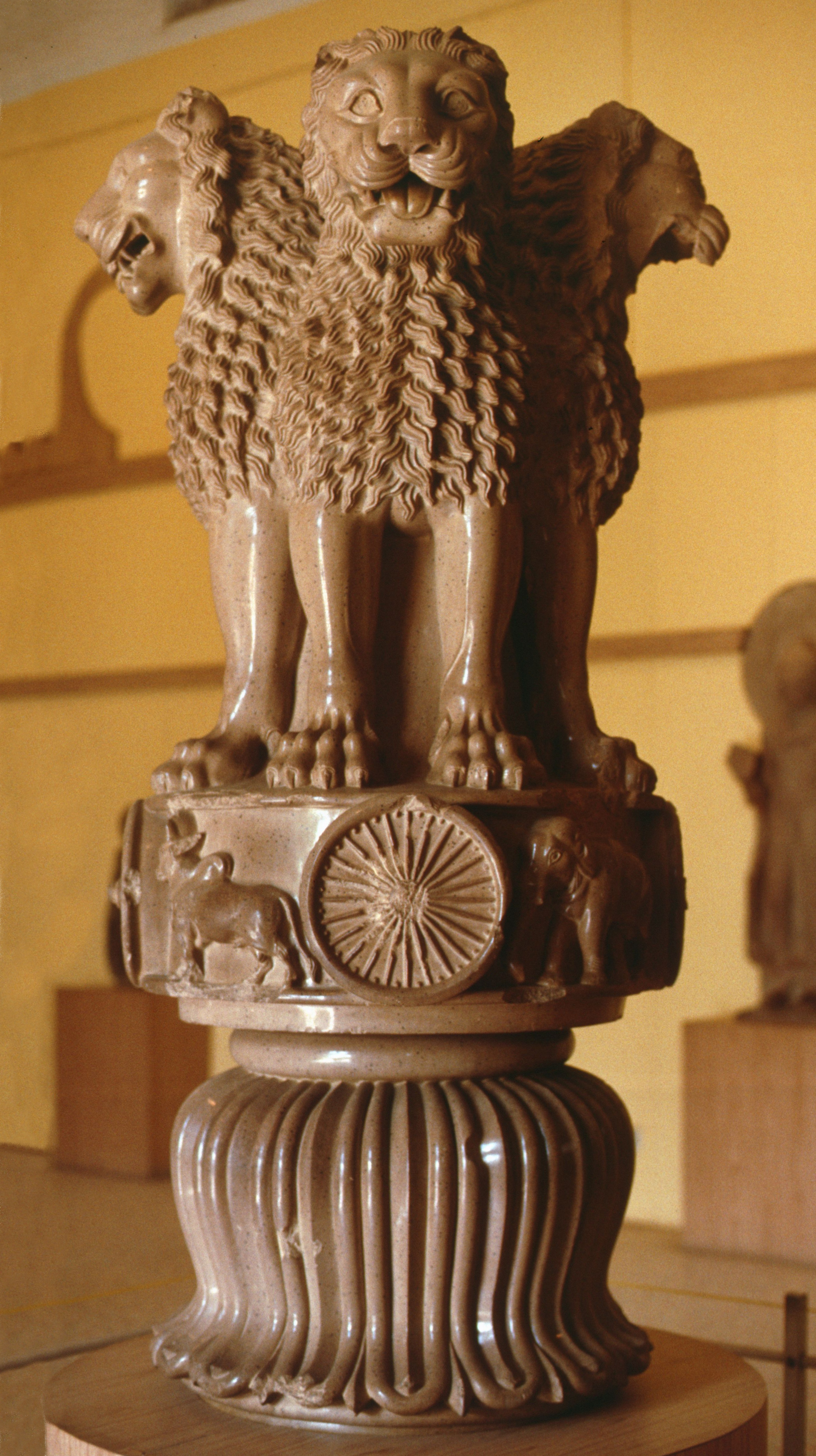
Lion Capital of Ashoka

The Lion Capital Series were a series of currency notes issued after India declared its independence from Great Britain and used until the Reserve Bank of India (RBI) introduced the Mahatma Gandhi Series in 1996 with banknotes in denominations of 10 and 500 rupees, and were designed with the image of the Lion Capital of Ashoka, the National Emblem which replaced the George VI banknote series. The first banknotes printed after India achieved its independence was a 1-rupee note.

== Lion Capital Series Banknotes I ==
Lion Capital Series
Image		Value	Dimensions (millimetres)	Main colour	Description			Date of	
Obverse	Reverse	Value	Dimensions (millimetres)	Main colour	Obverse	Reverse	Watermark	Issue	Withdrawal
		₹20		Orange	State Emblem of India	Parliament House	State Emblem of India	1962	1997
		₹10			State Emblem of India	Fishing boat	State Emblem of India		

== Lion Capital Series Banknotes II ==
Lion Capital Series
Image		Value	Dimensions (millimetres)	Main colour	Description			Date of	
Obverse	Reverse	Value	Dimensions (millimetres)	Main colour	Obverse	Reverse	Watermark	Issue	Withdrawal
		₹100	157 × 73 mm	Multicolour	State Emblem of India	Agriculture endeavour	State Emblem of India	1975	1995
		₹50	147 × 73 mm	Lilac Purple	State Emblem of India	Parliament House	State Emblem of India	1981	1995
		₹20	148 × 62 mm	Red Purple	State Emblem of India	Konark wheel	State Emblem of India	1975	2000
		₹10			State Emblem of India	Indian peacock	State Emblem of India	1975	2000
		₹5			State Emblem of India	Tractor	State Emblem of India		

== See also ==
- Indian rupee
- Mahatma Gandhi Series
- Mahatma Gandhi New Series
