= Indian 10-rupee note =

Denomination of the Indian rupee

Ten rupees
- Country: India
- Value: ₹10 (approx. $0.13)
- Width: 123 mm
- Height: 63 mm
- Security features: Security thread, micro-lettering, watermark, numerals growing from small to big and a see through registration device.
- Years of printing: January 2018 – present

Obverse
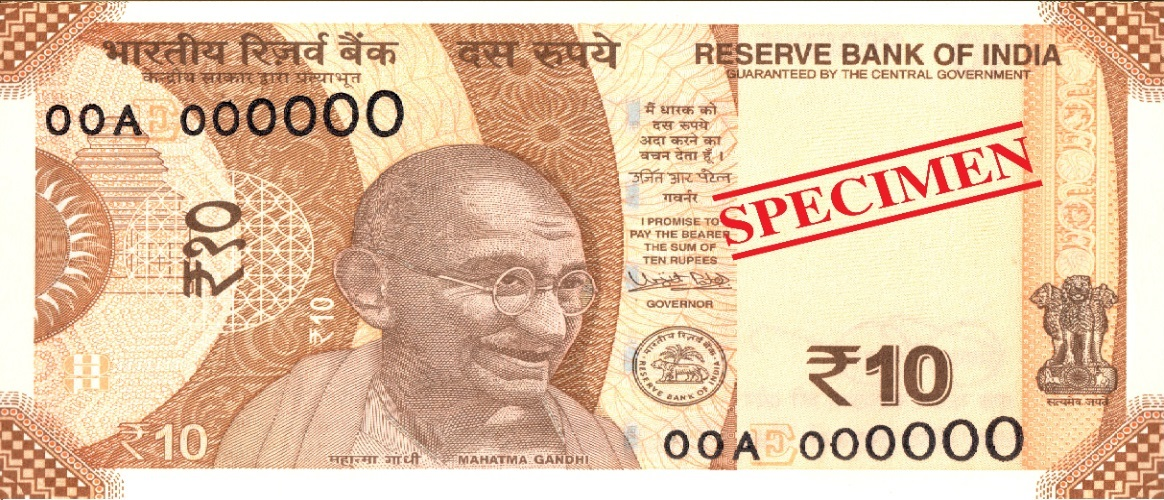
- Design: Mahatma Gandhi
- Designer: Reserve Bank of India
- Design date: 2017; 9 years ago

Reverse
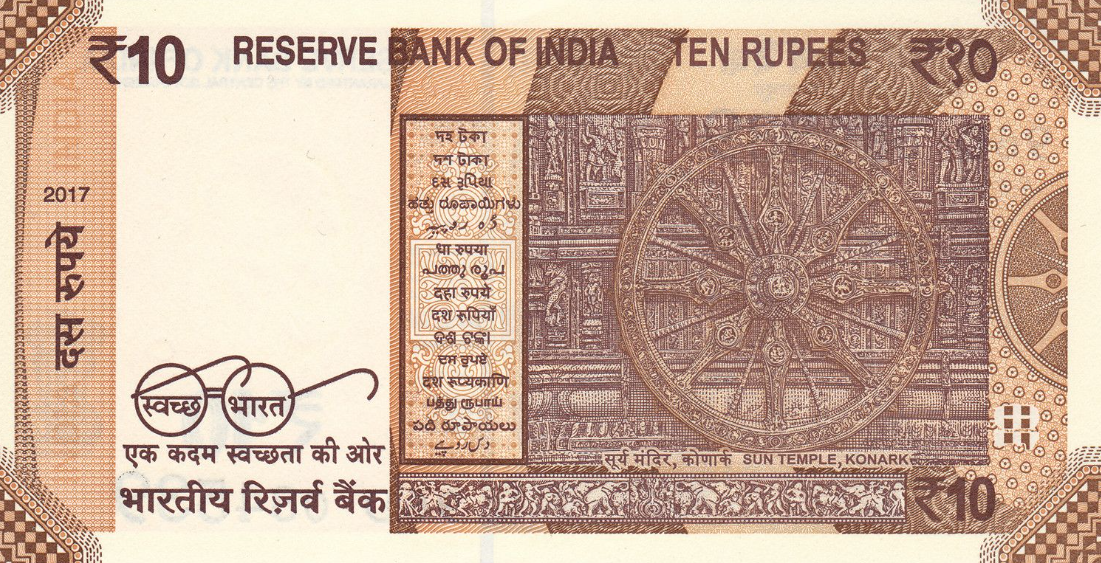
- Design: Konark Sun Temple
- Designer: Reserve Bank of India
- Design date: 2017; 9 years ago

The Indian 10-rupee banknote (₹10) is a common denomination of the Indian rupee. The ₹10 note was one of the first notes introduced by the Reserve Bank of India as a part of the Mahatma Gandhi Series in 1996. These notes are presently in circulation along with the Mahatma Gandhi New Series which were introduced in January 2018, this is used alongside the 10-rupee coin.

The 10-rupee banknote has been issued and had been in circulation since colonial times, and in continuous production since Reserve Bank of India took over the functions of the controller of currency in India in 1935.

== Mahatma Gandhi New Series ==
On 5 January 2018, the Reserve Bank of India announced, a new redesigned ₹10 banknote.

=== Design ===
The Reserve Bank of India issued ₹10 denomination banknotes in the Mahatma Gandhi (New) Series with motif of Sun Temple, Konark on the reverse, depicting the country's cultural heritage. The base colour of the note is Chocolate brown. Dimensions of the banknote are 123 mm × 63 mm.

=== Security features ===
The security features seen on the new Mahatma Gandhi series 10 rupee note are:

- See through register with denominational numeral 10
- Denominational numeral १० in Devnagari
- Micro letters "RBI", "भारत", "INDIA" and "10"
- Windowed demetalised security thread with inscriptions "भारत" and "RBI"
- Mahatma Gandhi portrait and electrotype 10 Watermark
- Number panel with numerals growing from small to big on the top left side and bottom right side]
- Year of printing of the note on the back

== History ==
Indian ten-rupee old note

=== George VI Series ===
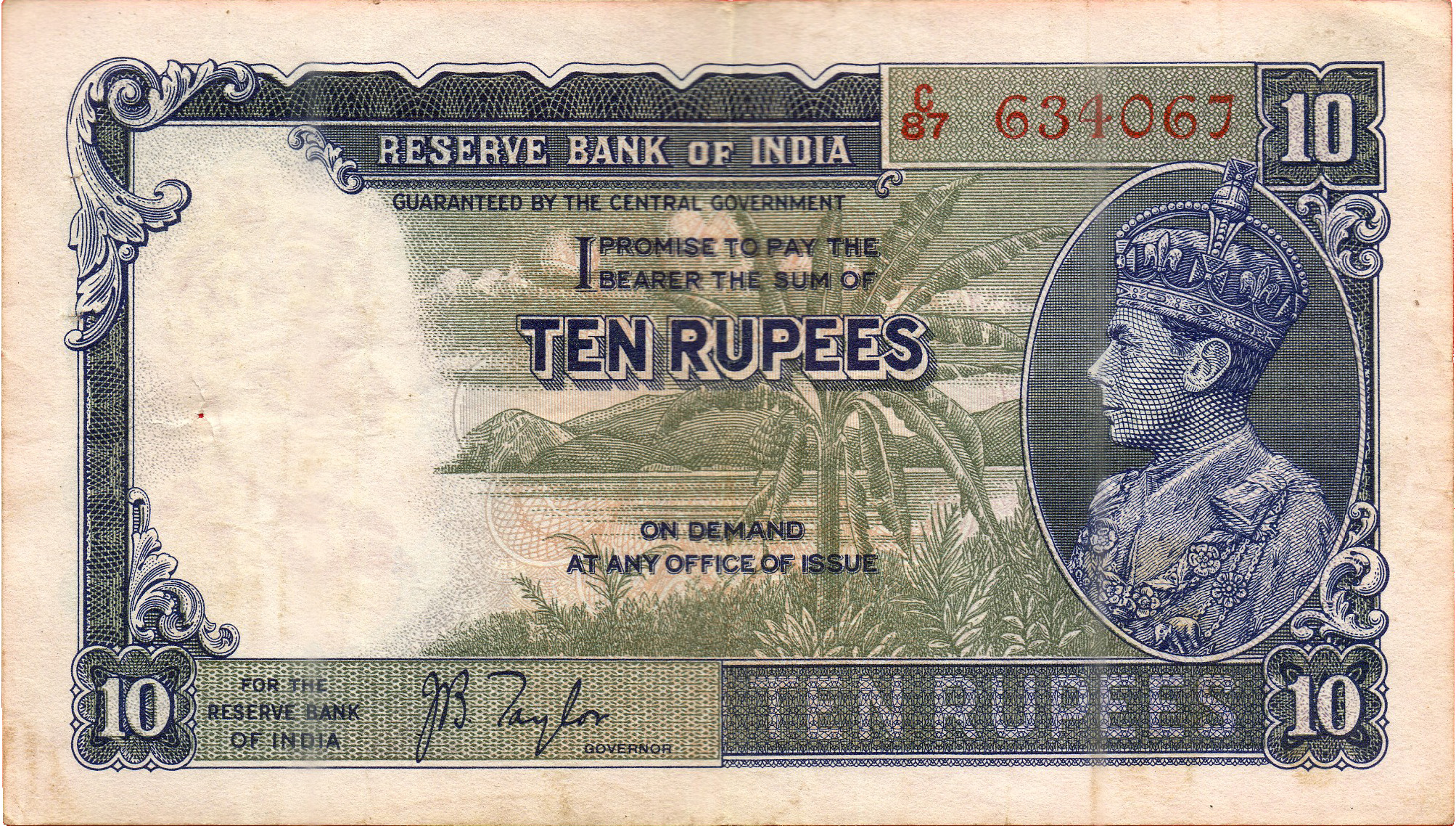
Ten-rupee note issued by the Reserve Bank of India from 1937 to 1943.

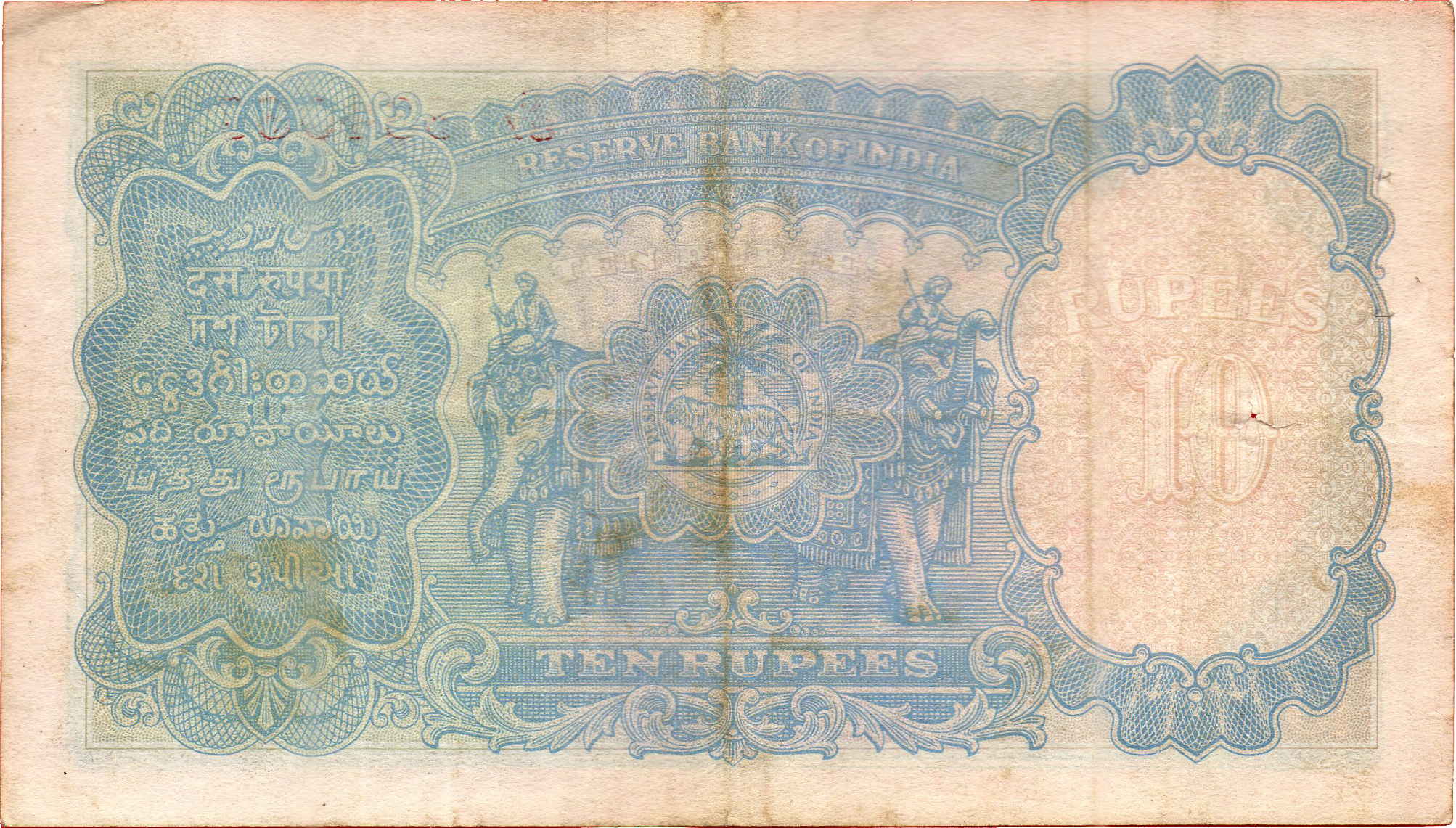
Ten-rupee note issued by the Reserve Bank of India from 1937 to 1943.

The 10 rupee banknote of the George VI Series in 1937, had the portrait of George VI on the obverse and featured two elephants with the banknote denomination written in Urdu, Hindi, Bengali, Burmese, Telugu, Tamil, Kannada and Gujarati on the reverse.

=== Lion Capital Series ===
The 10-rupee banknote of the Lion Capital Series in 1970, had the Ashoka pillar and the banknote denomination written in Hindi, Assamese, Bengali, Gujarati, Kannada, Kashmiri, Malayalam, Marathi, Odia, Punjabi, Sanskrit, Tamil, Telugu and Urdu on the obverse, and featured two peacocks and the banknote denomination written in English on the reverse while another design had the lion capital on the obverse and the image of the Shalimar Baug(lit. Shalimar garden) in Kashmir on the reverse side.

=== Mahatma Gandhi Series ===
==== Design ====
The ₹10 banknote of the Mahatma Gandhi Series is 137 × 63 mm Orange-violet coloured, with the obverse side featuring a portrait of Mahatma Gandhi with a signature of the governor of Reserve Bank of India. It does not have the Braille feature that assists the visually challenged in identifying the currency. The reverse side features a motif of a Rhinoceros, an elephant and a tiger, all together as Fauna of India.

As of 2011, the new ₹ sign has been incorporated into banknote of ₹10. In January 2014 RBI announced that it would be withdrawing from circulation all banknotes printed prior to 2005 by 31 March 2014. The deadline was later extended to 1 January 2015, then further to 30 June 2016.

As per an announcement made by the Reserve Bank of India (RBI) in March 2017, a new version of the Indian 10-Rupee note will be issued soon, with better security features. The year of printing will be on the reverse note side. The numerals printed inside both note panels will be in ascending size, from left side to right side.

==== Security features ====
The security features of the ₹10 banknote includes:

- A windowed security thread that reads 'भारत' (Bharata in the Devanagari script) and 'RBI' alternately.
- Watermark of Mahatma Gandhi that is a mirror image of the main portrait.
- The number panel of the banknote is printed in embedded fluorescent fibers and optically variable ink.
- Since 2005 additional security features like machine-readable security thread, electrotype watermark, and year of print appears on the bank note.

== Languages ==
As like the other Indian rupee banknotes, the ₹10 banknote has its amount written in 17 languages. On the obverse, the denomination is written in English and Hindi. On the reverse is a language panel which displays the denomination of the note in 15 of the 22 official languages of India. The languages are displayed in alphabetical order. Languages included on the panel are Assamese, Bengali, Gujarati, Kannada, Kashmiri, Konkani, Malayalam, Marathi, Nepali, Odia, Punjabi, Sanskrit, Tamil, Telugu and Urdu.

Denominations in central level official languages (At below either ends)
| Language | ₹10 |
|---|---|
| English | Ten rupees |
| Hindi | दस रुपये |
Denominations in 15 state level/other official languages (As seen on the language panel)
| Assamese | দহ টকা |
| Bengali | দশ টাকা |
| Gujarati | દસ રૂપિયા |
| Kannada | ಹತ್ತು ರೂಪಾಯಿಗಳು |
| Kashmiri | دٔہ رۄپیہِ |
| Konkani | धा रुपया |
| Malayalam | പത്തു രൂപ |
| Marathi | दहा रुपये |
| Nepali | दस रुपियाँ |
| Odia | ଦଶ ଟଙ୍କା |
| Punjabi | ਦਸ ਰੁਪਏ |
| Sanskrit | दश रूप्यकाणि |
| Tamil | பத்து ரூபாய் |
| Telugu | పది రూపాయలు |
| Urdu | دس روپیے |
