= 2016 Indian banknote demonetisation =

Demonetisation of Indian banknotes

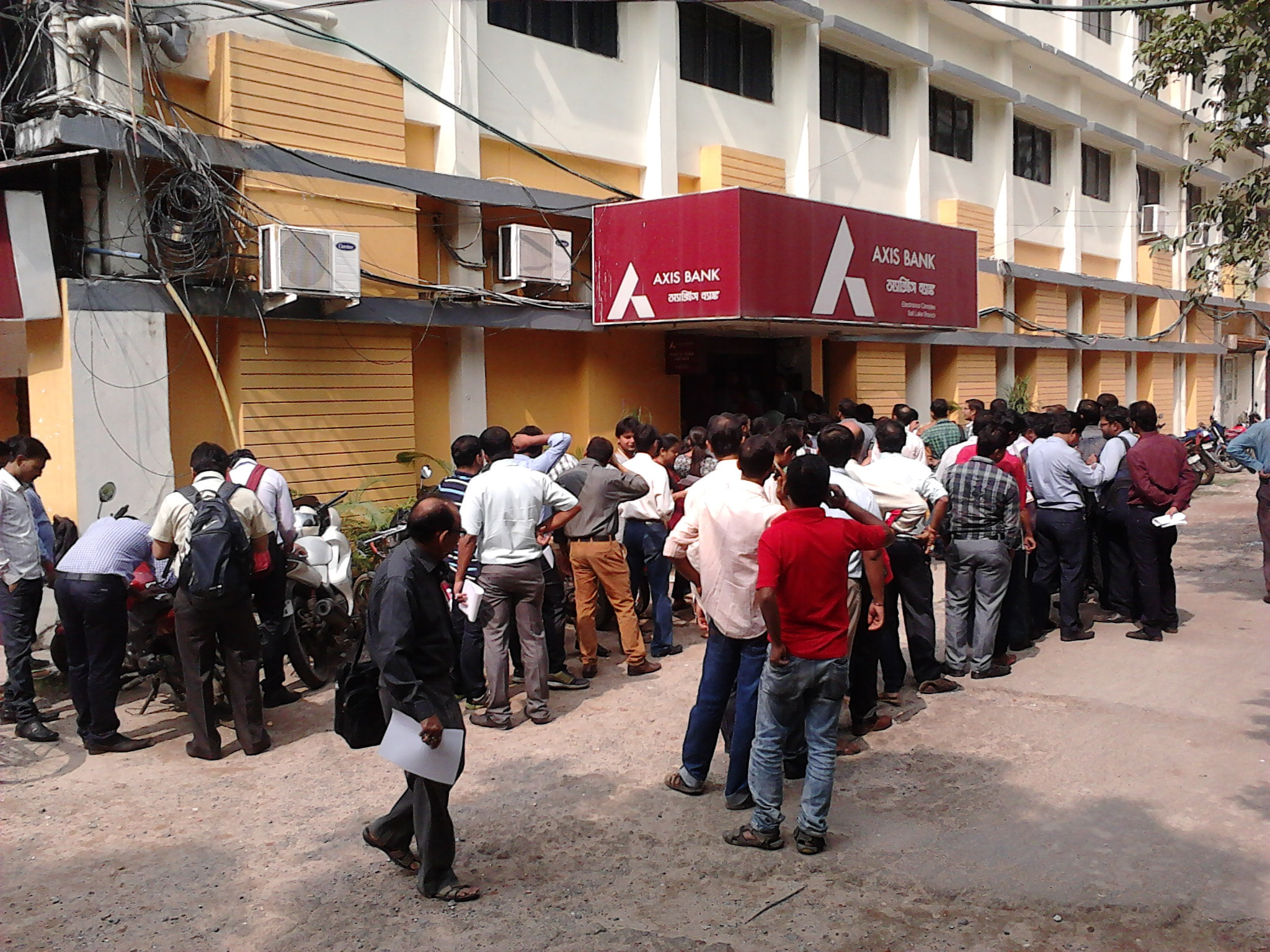
- Queues outside a bank to exchange demonetised banknotes in Kolkata on 10 November 2016
- Date: 8 November 2016 (10 years ago)
- Time: 20:00 IST (14:00 UTC)
- Deaths: 82

On 8 November 2016, the Government of India announced the demonetisation of all ₹500 and ₹1,000 banknotes of the Mahatma Gandhi Series. It also announced the issuance of new ₹500 and ₹2000 banknotes in exchange for the demonetised banknotes. Prime Minister Narendra Modi said that this decision would curtail the shadow economy, increase cashless transactions and reduce the use of illicit and counterfeit cash to fund illegal activity and terrorism.

The announcement of demonetisation was followed by prolonged cash shortages in the weeks that followed, which created significant disruption throughout the economy. People seeking to exchange their banknotes had to stand in lengthy queues, and several deaths were linked to the rush to exchange cash.

According to a 2018 report from the Reserve Bank of India ₹15.3 lakh crore (15.3 trillion rupees on the short scale) of the ₹15.41 lakh crore in demonetised bank notes, or approximately 99.3%, were deposited in banks, leading analysts to state that the effort had failed to remove black money from the economy. The BSE SENSEX and NIFTY 50 stock indices fell over 6% on the day after the announcement. The move reduced the country's industrial production and its GDP growth rate. It is estimated that 1.5 million jobs were lost. The move also saw a significant increase in digital and cashless transactions throughout the country.

Initially, the move received support from some central bankers as well as from some international commentators. The move was also criticised as poorly planned and unfair, and was met with protests, litigation, and strikes against the government in several places across India. Debates also took place concerning the move in both houses of Parliament. Consensus among independent commentators is that the demonetisation was unsuccessful in removing black money from the economy.

== Background ==
The Indian government had demonetised banknotes on two prior occasions—once in 1946 and once in 1978—and in both cases, the goal was to combat tax evasion via "black money" held outside the formal economic system. In 1978, the Janata Party coalition government demonetised banknotes of ₹1,000, ₹5,000 and ₹10,000, again in the hopes of curbing counterfeit money and black money.

In 2012, the Central Board of Direct Taxes recommended against demonetisation, saying in a report that "demonetisation may not be a solution for tackling black money or shadow economy, which is largely held in the form of benami properties, bullion and jewelry." According to data from income tax probes, black money holders kept only 6% or less of their wealth as cash, suggesting that targeting this cash would not be a successful strategy.

== Demonetisation process ==
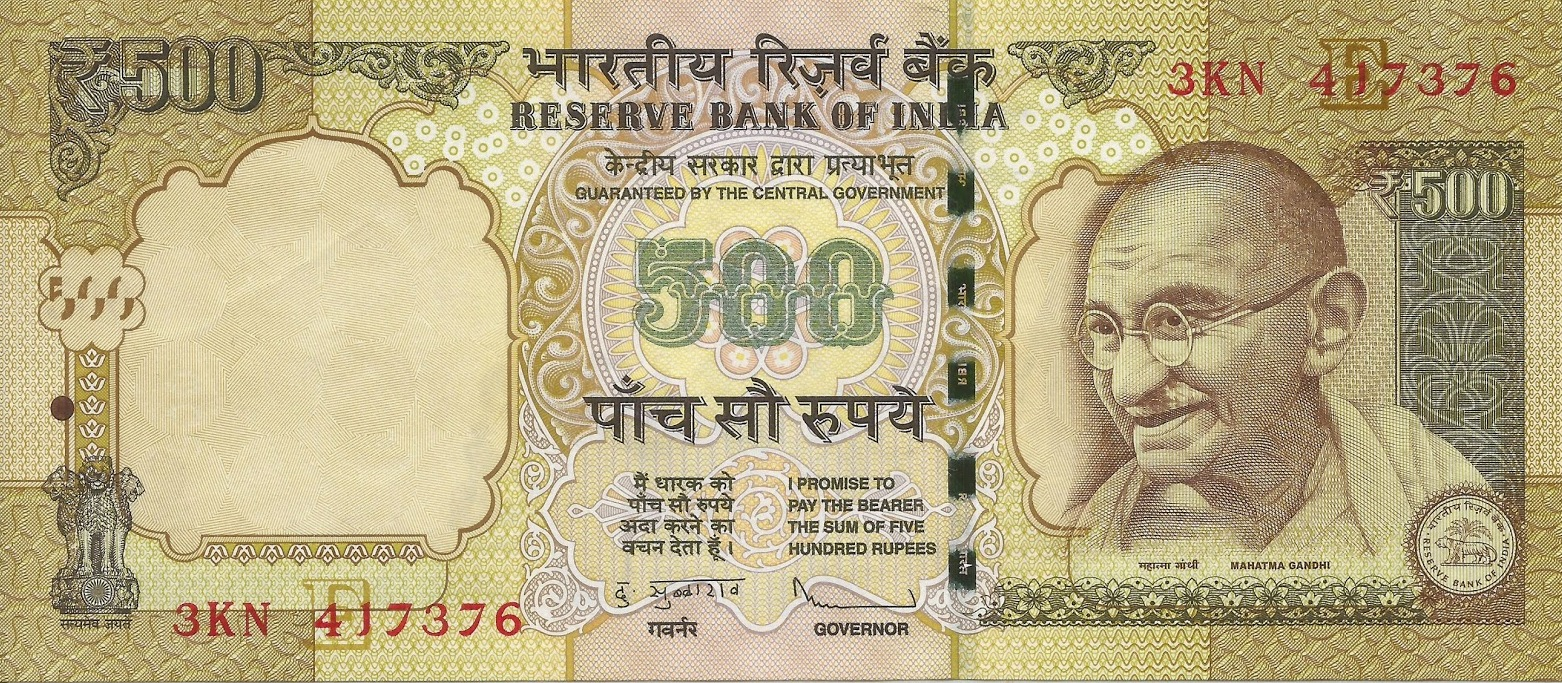
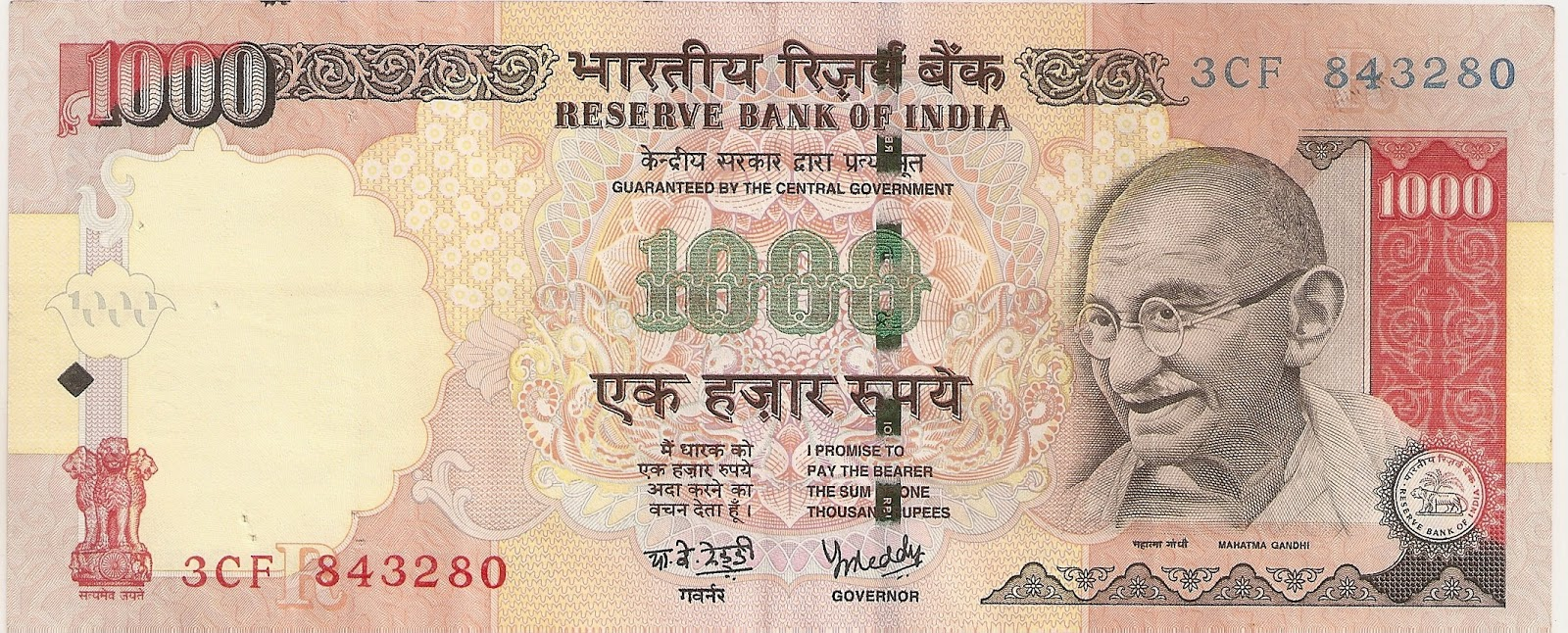
Demonetised ₹500 and ₹1,000 banknotes of the Mahatma Gandhi Series

=== Preparation and announcement ===
The plan to demonetise the ₹500 and ₹1,000 banknotes was initiated between six and ten months before it was a report by the State Bank of India (SBI) analysed possible strategies and effects of demonetisation. In May 2016, the Reserve Bank of India had started preparing for new banknotes and confirmed the design of ₹2,000 banknotes in August 2016. The printing of new banknotes started in October when the news stories of forthcoming new banknotes appeared in the media. On 27 October 2016, the Hindi daily Dainik Jagran published a report quoting RBI sources speaking of the forthcoming of ₹2,000 banknotes alongside withdrawal of ₹500 and ₹1,000 banknotes. On 21 October 2016, The Hindu Business Line had also covered a story on demands to withdraw the banknotes to prevent hoarding of black money.

The Board of the Reserve Bank of India met on 8 November 2016, 5:30 PM to consider a letter from the Ministry of Finance regarding demonetisation. "Two key reasons for the proposal cited in the government letter were: (1) between 2011 and 2016, the supply of 500- and 1,000-rupee bills had grown by 76 and 108 percent, respectively, while India's economy had only grown by 30 percent during this period; and (2) cash typically facilitated "black money." The board was further told that the measure was also intended to encourage greater financial inclusion and to incentivise greater digitisation of the economy. The board approved the proposal, but raised several concerns. It noted that the measure may not have the desired effect on black money because most people do not hold undeclared wealth in cash. It also warned that potential negative effects on growth were likely to occur in the short run. The board also stated that the premise on which the government had based its proposal—that the supply of 500- and 1,000-rupee bills had far outstripped the growth rate of the economy—was flawed because it had compared real GDP growth with nominal growth of currency supply. It noted that nominal GDP growth had summed to over 80 percent between 2011 and 2016 and hence was in line with the growth of the currency bills to be demonetised."

The Union cabinet was apprised of the plan on 8 November 2016 in a meeting in the evening convened by Prime Minister Modi. Soon after the meeting, Modi announced the demonetisation in an unscheduled live national televised address at 20:15 IST. He declared circulation of all ₹500 and ₹1,000 banknotes of the Mahatma Gandhi Series as invalid effective from the midnight of the same day, and announced the issuance of new ₹500 and ₹2,000 banknotes of the Mahatma Gandhi New Series in exchange for the demonetised banknotes.

=== Information leak rumours ===
After the announcement of demonetisation, a prominent businessman claimed to have received prior tip-offs and rumours warning of the move and after seeing leaked photos of new ₹2,000 notes "knew what was coming", allowing them to preserve their money by converting it into smaller denominations. A Bharatiya Janata Party (BJP) member from Rajasthan Legislative Assembly, Bhawani Singh Rajawat, claimed in a video that wealthy businessmen were informed about the demonetisation before it occurred. He later denied making the comments.

=== Cash exchange and withdrawal ===
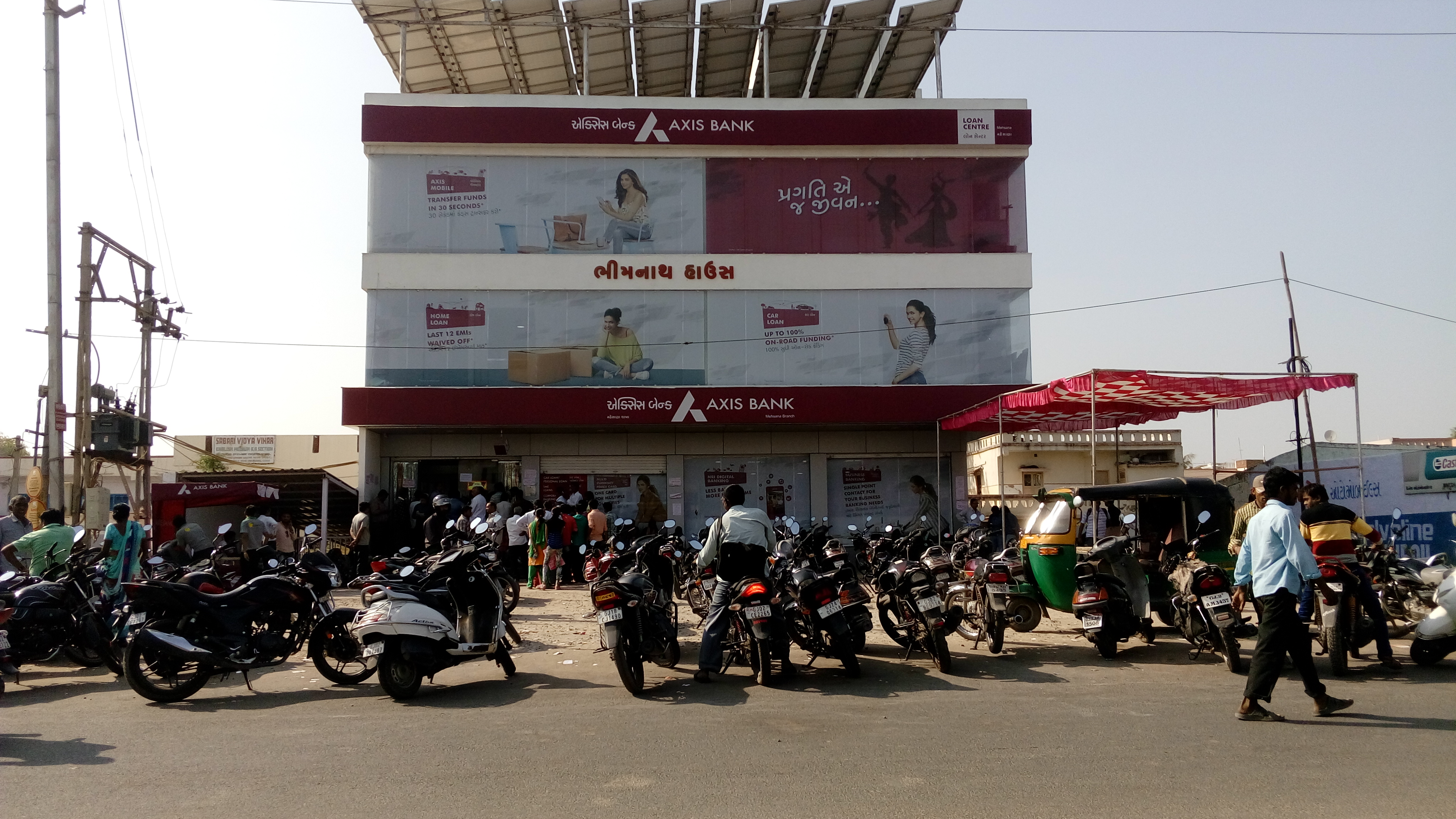
People gathered at an ATM of Axis Bank on 16 November 2016 in Mehsana, Gujarat to withdraw cash following deposit of demonetised banknotes in bank.

The Reserve Bank of India stipulated that the demonetised banknotes could be deposited with banks over a period of fifty days until 30 December 2016. The banknotes could also be exchanged for legal tender over the counter at all banks. The limit for such exchange was ₹4,000 per person from 8 to 13 November, was increased to ₹4,500 from 14 to 17 November, and reduced to ₹2,000 from 18 to 25 November. The exchange of banknotes was stopped completely on 25 November, although the government had previously stated that the volume of exchange would be increased after that date. International airports also facilitated an exchange of banknotes for foreign tourists and out-bound travellers, amounting to a total value of ₹5,000 per person. Fuel pumps, government hospitals, railway and airline booking counters, state-government recognised dairies and ration stores, and crematoriums were allowed to accept the demonetised banknotes until 2 December 2016.

Cash withdrawals from bank accounts were restricted to ₹10,000 per day and ₹20,000 per week per account from 10 to 13 November. This limit was increased to ₹24,000 per week from 14 November 2016. Limits on cash withdrawals from Current accounts/ Cash credit accounts/ Overdraft accounts were withdrawn later. RBI increased the withdrawal limit from Savings Bank account to ₹50,000 from the earlier ₹24,000 on 20 February 2017 and then on 13 March 2017, it removed all withdrawal limits from savings bank accounts.

A daily limit on withdrawals from ATMs was also imposed varying from ₹2,000 per day until 14 November, and ₹2,500 per day until 31 December. This limit was increased to ₹4,500 per day from 1 January, and again to ₹10,000 from 16 January 2017. From 17 November, families were allowed to withdraw ₹250,000 for wedding expenses. Farmers were permitted to withdraw ₹25,000 per week against crop loans.

=== Ordinance and Acts ===
The Specified Bank Notes (Cessation of Liabilities) Ordinance, 2016 was issued on 28 December 2016, ending the liability of the government for the demonetised banknotes. The ordinance also imposed fines on people found carrying out transactions with them after 8 November 2016, or holding more than ten of them after 30 December 2016. It provided for the exchange of the banknotes after 30 December for people who had been outside India between 9 November and 30 December. The Specified Bank Notes (Cessation of Liabilities) Act, 2017 was notified on 1 March 2017, replacing the ordinance.

== Objectives and outcomes ==
The government said that the main objective of the exercise was curbing black money, which included income which had not been reported and thus was untaxed; money gained through corruption, illegal goods sales and illegal activities such as human trafficking; and counterfeit currency. Other stated objectives included expanding the tax base and increasing the number of taxpayers; reducing the number of transactions carried out by cash; reducing the finances available to terrorists and radical groups such as the Naxalite Maoists; and integrating the formal and informal economies.

=== Shifting of goalposts ===
The government was described as 'shifting the goalposts' with respect to the goals of the demonetisation exercise. The initial stated goal was to curb black money, corruption, and terrorism, but as it became apparent that almost all the cash was being exchanged, the goals were expanded to include making India a cashless economy and to neutralise money held by Maoists, terrorists and human traffickers, among others.

=== Black money ===
The government estimated that ₹5 trillion, or approximately 20%, of the demonetised banknotes would be permanently removed from circulation. However, according to a 2018 report from the RBI, 99.3% of the demonetised banknotes, or ₹15.3 trillion of the ₹15.41 trillion that had been demonetised, were deposited with the banking system. The banknotes that were not deposited were worth ₹107.2 billion. Commentators concluded that the government had failed in its aim of purging black money from the economy.

==== Evasion ====
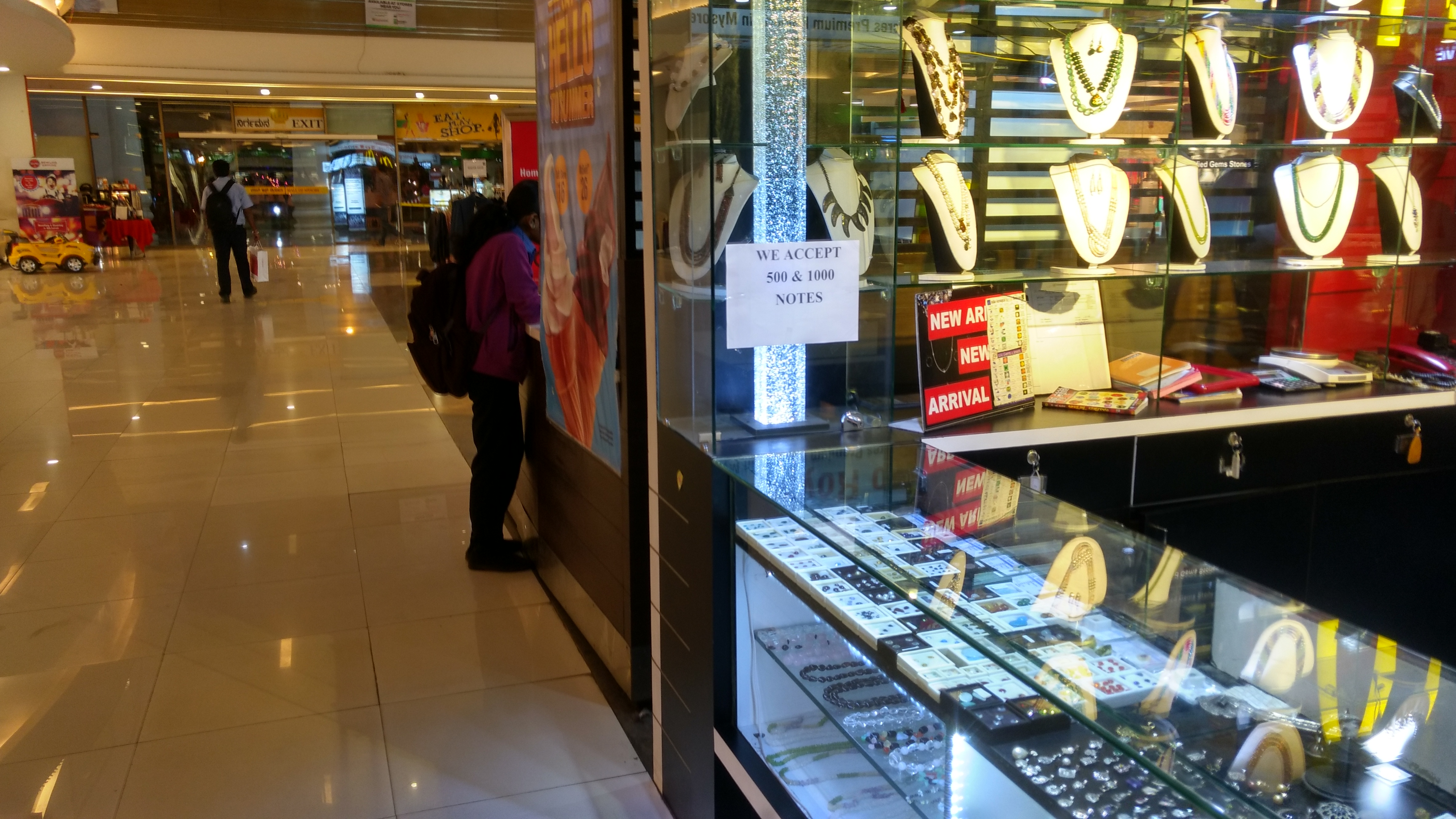
A jewellery store in a shopping mall with a notice "We accept ₹500 and ₹1,000 notes", even after they were no longer valid banknotes.

There were reports of people circumventing the restrictions imposed on exchange transactions by conducting multiple transactions at different bank branches, and by sending hired people, employees, and followers in groups to exchange large amounts of demonetised banknotes at banks. In Gujarat, Delhi and many other major cities, sales of gold increased post-demonetisation, surging the price as much as ₹45,000 (US$480) from the ruling price of ₹31,900 (US$340) per 10 grams (0.35 oz). The Enforcement Directorate raided several forex establishments making backdated entries. Money laundering using backdated accounting was carried out by co-operative banks, jewellers, sellers of mobile phones, and several other businesses.

The cash deposited into hundis (cash collection boxes in temples and gurudwaras) are exempted from inquiry by the tax department; this is sometimes to launder money. After the demonetisation, there was a spike in donations in the form of the demonetised banknotes in temples. People booked large numbers of railway tickets to dispose of unaccounted cash. This came to the notice of the Indian Railways authorities, who imposed restrictions to check evasion.

=== Counterfeit banknotes ===
Number of counterfeit banknotes detected in banks (April – March)
Denomination	2015–16	2016–17	2017–18	2018–19	2019–20
₹1	2	3	4	3	4
₹2 and ₹5	2	80	1	-	22
₹10	134	523	287	345	844
₹20	96	324	437	818	510
₹50	6,453	9,222	23,447	36,875	47,454
₹100	221,447	177,195	239,182	2,21,218	1,68,739
₹200	NA	NA	79	12,728	31,969
₹500 (old)	261,695	317,567	127,918	971	11
₹500 (new)	NA	199	9,892	21,865	30,054
₹1000	143,099	256,324	103,611	717	72
₹2000	NA	638	17,929	21,847	17,020
Total	632,926	762,027	522,783	3,17,384	2,96,695

After demonetisation, there was an increase in the number of counterfeit ₹100 and ₹50 banknotes. The number of counterfeit ₹500 and ₹1,000 (demonetised version) banknotes saw an increase in 2016–17 and subsequently a decline in 2017–18. But in 2017–18, there was an increase in counterfeit ₹500 and ₹2,000 (new version) banknotes than the previous year. There has been no significant change in the number of counterfeit banknotes detected. In 2017–18, the number of detected counterfeit banknotes was close to the number before demonetisation. Additionally, after demonetisation, only 0.0035% of the ₹1,000 banknotes were found to be counterfeit. The number of counterfeit banknotes of ₹500 and ₹2,000 (new version) detected continue to increase while overall number declined in 2018-19 and 2019–20.

=== Tax collection ===
Tax-to-GDP ratio (%) View source data.

The number of income tax returns filing increased from 43.3 million to 52.9 million between the financial year of 2016 and 2017, which was not a significant increase compared to the increase between 2015 and 2016. The tax compliance had increased with a number of income tax returns filing increased but the majority of them were from salaried and non-business class. The income tax collections increased in the financial year of 2017 due to Income Disclosure Scheme 2016. If adjusted for it, the increase in tax collection was modest. The tax-to-GDP ratio has increased due to expanding tax base. An analysis of the economic data shows that there has been no substantial increase in the number of new tax payers or direct tax collection due to demonetisation. Indirect tax/GDP ratio also remained on the trend path and had no visible impact.

The use of demonetised banknotes was allowed for the payment of municipal and local civic body taxes, leading to a jump in their revenue collections. For example, the Greater Hyderabad Municipal Corporation reported collecting about ₹1.6 billion in cash payments of outstanding and advance taxes within the first four days of demonetisation.

=== Digital payments ===
The push for digital payments was one of the stated intentions of demonetisation. There was an immediate and sharp jump in digital payments in November–December 2016 owing to shortages of cash. The debit card point of sales transactions was twice the size of value suggested by trends before demonetisation. The value of credit cards increased but no sharp growth was seen. The mobile wallet transactions picked up immediately after demonetisation, followed by a dip in mid-2017 due to easing cash shortages. There was again sharp rise thereafter. By April 2018, the volume of the digital payments had doubled. After return of the cash, the growth in digital payment had been modest.

The currency-to-GDP ratio was 12.1% in 2015–16. It declined to 8.8% in 2016–17 due to demonetisation but increased again to 10.9% in 2017–18. The currency-to-GDP ratio was only marginally lower compared to levels before demonetisation.

=== Banknotes in circulation ===
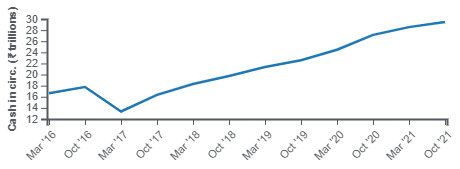
Cash in circulation

On 28 October 2016, the total banknotes in circulation in India were valued at ₹17.77 trillion; what proportion of this derived from ₹500 and ₹1,000 banknotes was unknown. In its annual report of March 2016, the Reserve Bank of India (RBI) stated that total banknotes in circulation valued ₹16.42 trillion, of which nearly 86% (around ₹14.18 trillion) derived from ₹500 and ₹1,000 banknotes. In terms of volume, the report stated that 24% (around 22.03 billion) of the total 90.26 billion (9026.6 crore) banknotes in circulation were ₹500 and ₹1,000 banknotes.

Before demonetisation (November 2016), there were banknotes worth ₹17.97 trillion in the market. The demonetised banknotes constituted 86.4% of it. The banknotes in circulation had reached to the level before demonetisation in March 2018. By March 2018, there were banknotes worth ₹18.03 trillion in the market; an increase of 9.9%. New banknotes of ₹2,000 and ₹500 constitute 80.6% of it. Thus, small domination banknotes increased by only 5.8%. The volume of banknotes in the market increased by 2.1%. The banknotes in circulation had further increased to ₹19.5 trillion in September 2018 and ₹21.41 trillion in March 2019, 19.14% higher than the level before demonetisation. Five years after demonetisation, the currency in circulation was at a record high of ₹29.17 trillion on 29 October 2021.

=== Terrorism and internal security ===
Initially following demonetisation, activities and attacks by the Maoist Naxalite radical groups decreased, which was attributed to lack of finance following demonetisation. The surrender rate had reached its highest. The activities returned within few months. There was a decrease in the terror activities in Jammu and Kashmir.

== Other effects ==
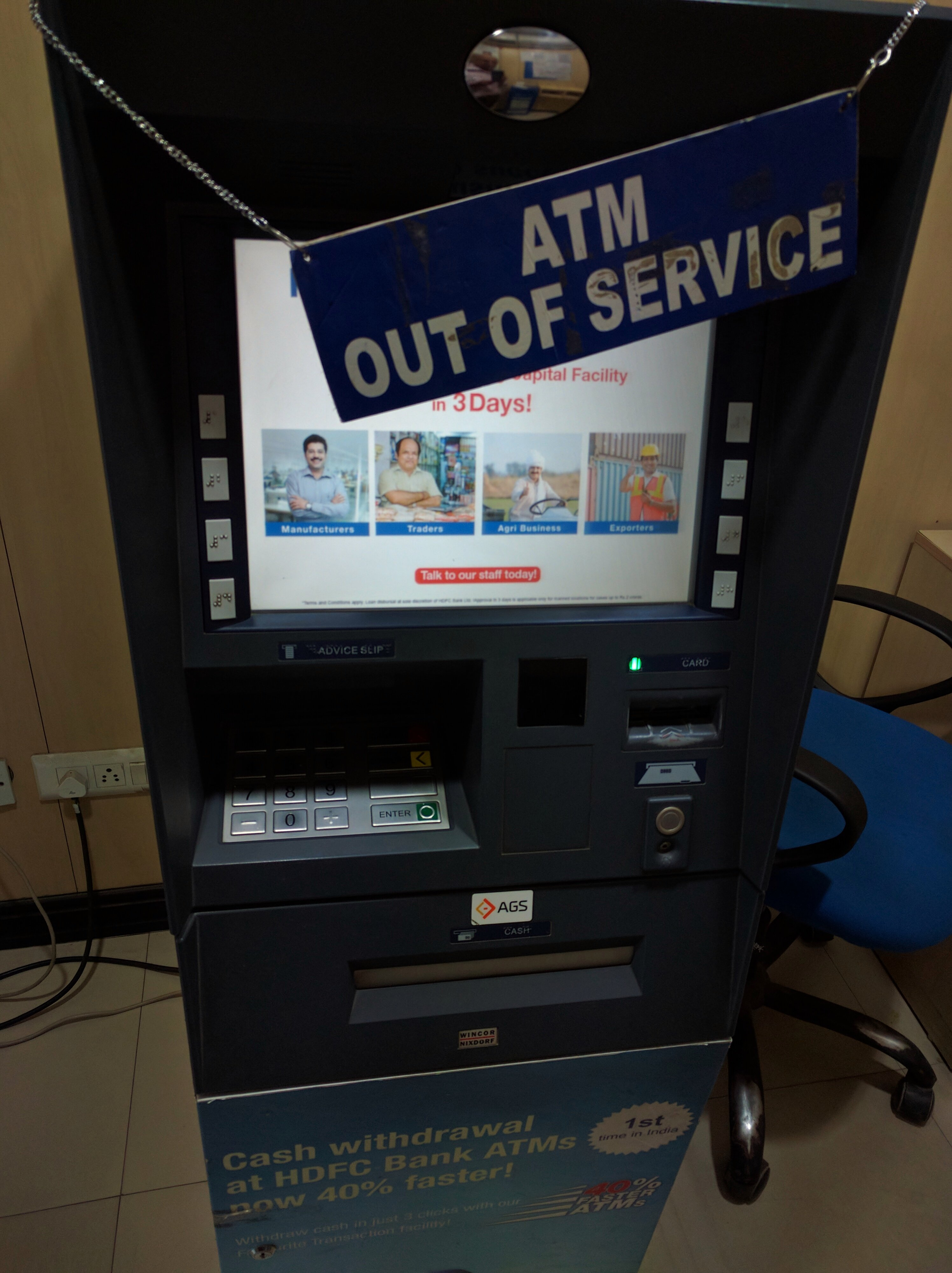
Cashless ATM as on 1 December

=== Shortage of cash ===
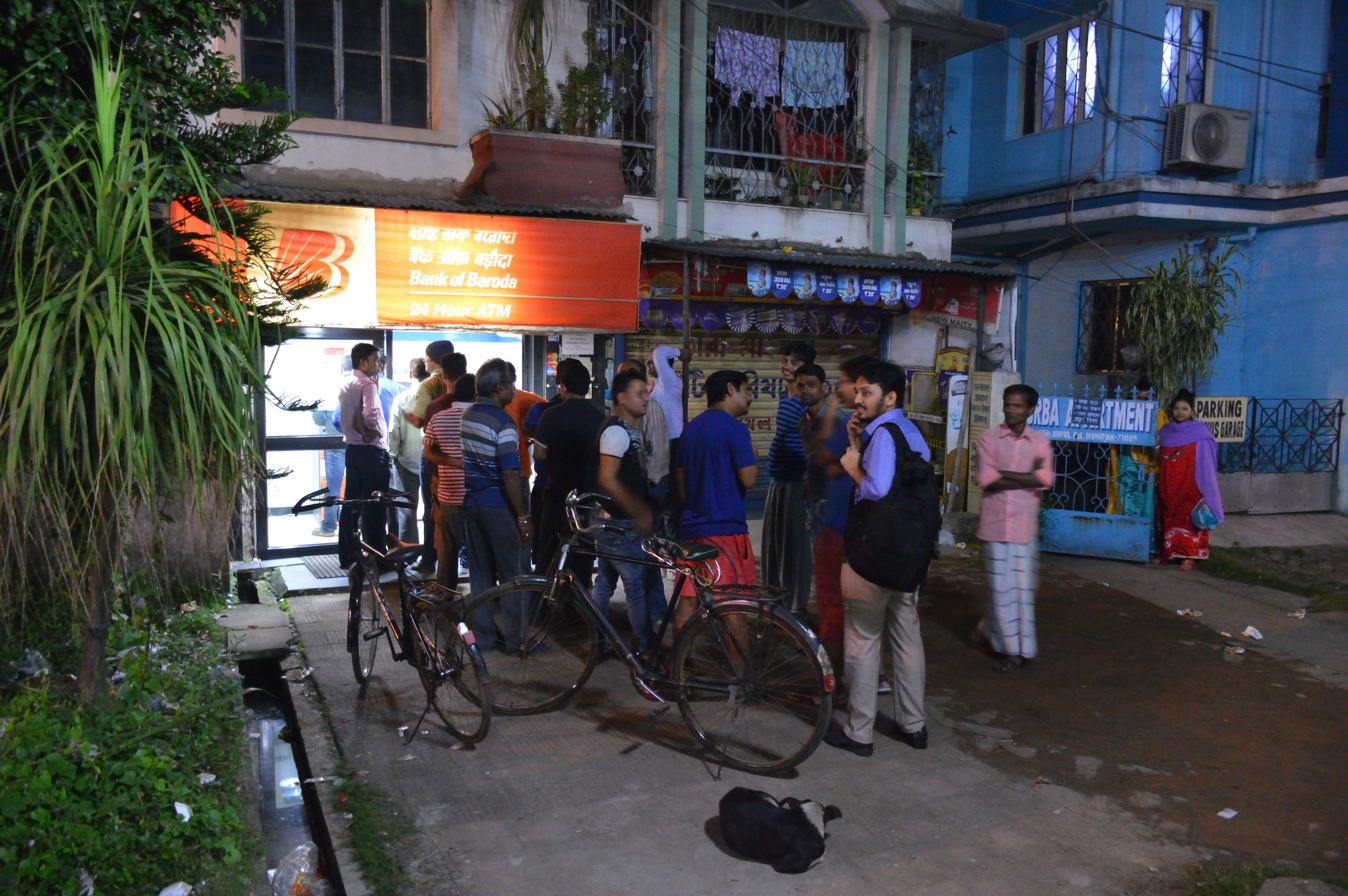
Queue at an ATM for ₹100 banknotes in Howrah, on 8 November 2016, 22:23 (IST)

The scarcity of cash due to demonetisation led to chaos, and people faced difficulties in depositing or exchanging the demonetised banknotes due to long queues outside banks and ATMs across India. The ATMs were short of cash for months after demonetisation.

During the demonetisation, police and tax officials across India seized ₹6.1 billion in unaccounted money, including ₹1.1 billion in new banknotes. Reports in the media noted that although the general public faced a severe cash shortage, some individuals were able to amass tens of millions of rupees in new banknotes; they thus described the demonetisation exercise as being futile.

=== Transport ===
The All India Motor Transport Congress claimed that about 800,000 truck drivers and conductors were affected with the shortage of cash, with around 400,000 trucks stranded on major highways across India. Major toll plazas in Gujarat and on the Delhi-Mumbai highways also saw long queues as toll plaza operators refused the demonetised banknotes. The Ministry of Road Transport and Highways subsequently announced a suspension of toll collections on all national highways across the country until 2 December as well as acceptance of demonetised ₹500 banknotes as a toll from 2 to 15 December.

=== Stock market ===
As a combined effect of demonetisation and the US presidential election, the stock market indices dropped to an around six-month low in the week following the announcement. The day after the demonetisation announcement, BSE SENSEX crashed nearly 1,689 points and NIFTY 50 plunged by over 541 points. By the end of the intraday trading section on 15 November 2016, the BSE SENSEX index was lower by 565 points and the NIFTY 50 index was below 8100 intraday. There were marginal effects on the stock market during November–December 2016. A data study (July 2016 – February 2017) of 54 companies across 13 sectors listed with the NSE showed that companies in cement, cotton and rubber sectors showed an increase in total trades while companies in automotive, clothing, foods, paper, real estate, retail, steel, sugar, tea and textiles sectors showed a decrease in total trades after demonetisation. Demonetisation had a negative impact on stock market returns evidenced from NIFTY 50 and other NIFTY sectoral indices.

=== Industrial output ===
There was a reduction in industrial output as industries were hit by the cash shortage. The Purchasing Managers' Index (PMI) fell to 46.7 in November 2016 from 54.5 in October 2016, recording its sharpest reduction in three years. A reading above 50 indicates growth and a reading below shows contraction. This indicates a slowdown in both manufacturing and services industries. The PMI report also showed that the reduction in inflation in November 2016 was due to a shortage in money supply.

The growth in eight core sectors such as cement, steel and refinery products, which constitute 38% of the Index of industrial production (IIP), was only to 4.9 percent in November 2016, as compared with 6.6 percent a month prior.

=== Agriculture ===
Demonetisation adversely affected transactions in the agriculture sector, which are heavily dependent on cash. Due to scarcity of the new banknotes, many farmers had insufficient cash to purchase seeds, fertilisers and pesticides needed for the plantation of rabi crops usually sown around mid-November. Farmers and their unions conducted protest rallies in Gujarat, Amritsar and Muzaffarnagar against the demonetisation as well as against restrictions imposed by the Reserve Bank of India on district cooperative central banks which were ordered not to accept or exchange the demonetised banknotes.

The shortage of cash led to plunge in demand which in turn led to a crash in the prices of crops. Farmers were unable to recover even the costs of transportation from their fields to the market from the low prices offered. Some farmers dumped their produce in protest against the government.

Demonetisation resulted in the relative erosion of agricultural wages and weak bargaining power of farmers for their produce.

=== Real GDP growth rate ===
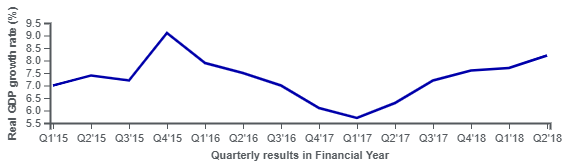
Real GDP growth rate – Quarterly (%)
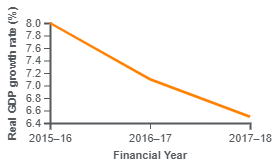
Real GDP growth rate – Year-on-Year (%)

Real GDP growth rate (base year 2011–12)
Financial Year	Quarter	Quarterly	Yearly
2015–16	Q1 (April–June)	7%	8%
2015–16	Q2 (July–September)	7.4%	8%
2015–16	Q3 (October–December)	7.2%	8%
2015–16	Q4 (January–March)	9.1%	8%
2016–17	Q1 (April–June)	7.9%	7.1%
2016–17	Q2 (July–September)	7.5%	7.1%
2016–17	Q3 (October–December)	7%	7.1%
2016–17	Q4 (January–March)	6.1%	7.1%
2017–18	Q1 (April–June)	5.7%	6.5%
2017–18	Q2 (July–September)	6.3%	6.5%
2017–18	Q3 (October–December)	7.2%	6.5%
2017–18	Q4 (January–March)	7.6%	6.5%
2018–19	Q1 (April–June)	7.7%	
2018–19	Q2 (July–September)	8.2%	
2018–19	Q3 (October–December)		
2018–19	Q4 (January–March)		

Global analysts cut their forecasts of India's real GDP growth rate for the financial year 2016–17 by 0.5 to 3% due to demonetisation. India's GDP in 2016 is estimated to be US$2.25 trillion, hence, each 1 per cent reduction in growth rate represents a shortfall of US$22.5 billion (₹1.54 trillion) for the Indian economy. According to Societe Generale, quarterly GDP growth rates would drop below 7% for an entire year at a stretch for the first time since June 2011.

The Q4'16–17 rate was 6.1% as against a forecast of 7.1% by economists. The rate for the financial year 2016–17 was 7.1%, a reduction from the 8% in 2015–16. This drop was attributed to demonetisation by economists.

The GDP growth rate for Q1'17–18 dropped to 5.7%, compared to 7.9% a year prior, the lowest since March 2014. This drop was attributed to demonetisation as well as inventory drawdown by companies due to the forthcoming implementation of the Goods and Service Tax. The GDP started to recover from 2017–18 and clocked 8.2% growth in 2018–19. The Hindustan Times in November 2021 reviewed GDP trends in the years following the demonetisation, and concluded that due to unpredented GDP contraction amid the COVID-19 pandemic and strong base effects, "the waters are now far too muddied to make any scientific assessment about demonetisation’s impact" on GDP.

=== Employment ===
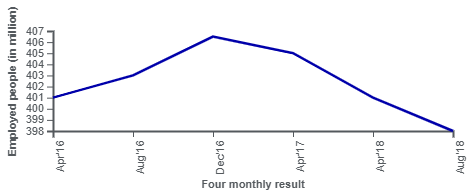
Employed workforce
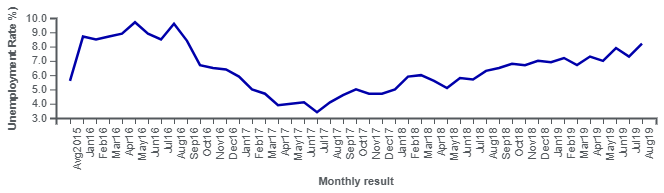
Monthly unemployment rate

Demonetisation caused a loss of jobs and a decline in wages, particularly in the unorganised and informal sector and as well as in small enterprises. Migrant workers were adversely affected by demonetisation.

According to the report prepared by the Centre for Monitoring Indian Economy (CMIE), the number of employed people was 401 million in January–April 2016, 403 million during May–August 2016, and 406.5 million in September–December 2016. After demonetisation in November 2016, the number fell to 405 million in January–April 2017. So there was fall of 1.5 million in number of people employed. CMIE also reported that the number of persons employed was 406.7 million in 2016–17 which fell by 0.1% to 406.2 million in 2017–18. So the employment had stagnated which resulted in employment rate decline. The employment rate fell from 42.59% in 2016–17 to 41.45% in 2016–17. The unemployment rate also declined from 7.51% in 2016–17 to 4.66% in 2017–18 because of the shrinking employed force. The number of the employed force fell from 439.7 million in 2016–17 to 426.1 million in 2017–18. CMIE attributed the impact to demonetisation as well as implementation of Goods and Services Tax in July 2017.

It is estimated that 1.5 million jobs were lost, according to The Guardian.

=== Cost to banks ===
Before demonetisation, the RBI had spent ₹34.21 billion to print banknotes in 2015–2016 (July to June). The cost of printing new banknotes rose to ₹79.65 billion in 2016–17 and ₹49.12 billion in 2017–18. This resulted in a decline in the dividend paid to the government from ₹658.76 billion in 2015–16 to ₹306.59 billion in 2016–17 and ₹500 billion in 2017–18. It was estimated that this decrease in income for the government could cause the fiscal deficit for the financial year 2016–17 to increase from the targeted 3.2% to 3.4%. The Indian Air Force was paid ₹294.1 million to move banknotes after demonetisation.

The banks incurred the cost in collection, storage, and movement of banknotes across the country, as well as the cost of re-calibrating ATMs for the new banknotes (as they differed in size from the old ones).

=== Welfare schemes ===
Demonetisation negatively impacted the Midday Meal Scheme due to the shortage of funds.

=== Deaths due to demonetisation ===
Several people were reported to have died from standing in queues for hours to exchange their demonetised banknotes. Deaths were also attributed to lack of medical help due to refusal of demonetised banknotes by hospitals. In one month after the demonetisation was announced, 82 people died according to a detailed list compiled by Catch News. By the end of December 2016, political opposition leaders claimed that over 100 people had died due to demonetisation. In March 2017, the government stated that they received no official report on deaths connected to demonetisation. Later in December 2018, the then Finance Minister Arun Jaitley reported in parliament that four people, three bank personnel and one customer of the State Bank of India, died during demonetisation.

== Legal issues ==
M. Seeni Ahamed, General Secretary of the Indian National League, filed a public interest litigation (PIL) to scrap the decision of demonetisation. The High Court dismissed the PIL, stating that it could not interfere in monetary policies of the government. Similar PILs were also filed in the Supreme Court of India. In November 2017, the Supreme Court of India referred all cases which have similarity to demonetisation to constitutional bench to review the legality of the demonetisation, implementation irregularities and violation of people's rights by limits on cash withdrawals. On 17 December 2017 the Supreme Court declined to give immediate relief on any of the demonetisation measures but in response to ninety petitions filed against it, referred nine queries to Constitutional Bench.

The government had initially announced that any person who was unable to deposit the demonetised banknotes by 31 December 2016 would be given an opportunity to do so until a later date. However, the government allowed only Non-Resident Indians (NRIs) to deposit demonetised banknotes after 31 December 2016. As a result, many people were left stranded with demonetised banknotes. People petitioned the courts to allow a deposit of the demonetised banknotes. In November 2017, the Supreme Court dismissed 14 petitions related to demonetisation, and asked petitioners to file pleas with a constitutional bench which would deal with cases related to demonetisation.

In a 4:1 majority judgement in January 2023, the Supreme Court of India refused to strike down the demonetisation decision of 2016 on the basis of proportionality, saying that the process followed by the government to take the action was not flawed, even if the move did not achieve its objectives. The dissenting judgement said that the procedure of notification of demonetisation by the government was unlawful, while agreeing with the majority decision that the government has the authority to take such a decision, regardless of the validity of the reasons for the decision.

== Reactions ==
=== Reactions of economists ===
Most economists across the ideological spectrum, were broadly critical of the demonetisation as an economic policy.

Nobel laureate Amartya Sen, called the demonetisation a "despotic action" and said that it "undermines notes, it undermines bank accounts, it undermines the entire economy of trust." Former senior vice-president and chief economist of the World Bank Kaushik Basu, called it a "major mistake" and said that the "damage" is likely to be much greater than any possible benefits. Pronab Sen, former Chief Statistician and Planning Commission of India member, called it a "hollow move" since it did not really address any of the purported goals of tackling black money or fake currency. Prabhat Patnaik, a former professor of economics at the Jawaharlal Nehru University, Delhi called the move 'witless' and 'anti-people'. He criticised the assumption that black money was "a hoard of cash", saying that it would have little effect in eliminating "black activities" and would "caus[e] much hardship to common people." Columbia University economist Jagdish Bhagwati, however, praised the demonetisation, calling it "a courageous and substantive economic reform that, despite the significant transition costs, has the potential to generate large future benefits."

Nobel laureate Richard Thaler, initially, praised the demonetisation of larger currency notes as "a policy I have long supported, First step towards cashless and good start on reducing corruption.", but was befuddled with the introduction of even bigger Rs.2000 banknote later on. Economist and journalist T. N. Ninan wrote in the Business Standard that demonetisation 'looks like a bad idea, badly executed on the basis of some half-baked notions'. Steve Forbes described the move as "sickening and immoral." Forbes wrote that "[w]hat India has done is commit a massive theft of people's property without even the pretense of due process—a shocking move for a democratically elected government." Nobel laureate Paul Krugman opined that it was difficult to see gains from demonetisation, while there might be significant costs to it.

Economic analyst Vivek Kaul stated in a BBC article that "demonetisation had been a failure of epic proportions." Jayati Ghosh, C. P. Chandrasekhar and Prabhat Patnaik wrote that demonetisation was unnecessary and unsuccessful, while it damaged the economy and adversely affected the lives and rights of the Indian people.

=== Reactions of industrialists ===
The decision met with mixed initial reactions. Several bankers like Arundhati Bhattacharya (Former Chairperson of State Bank of India) and Chanda Kochhar (MD & CEO of ICICI Bank) favored the demonetisation in order to curb black money. Businessmen Anand Mahindra (Mahindra Group), Sajjan Jindal (JSW Group), Kunal Bahl (Snapdeal and FreeCharge) also supported the move, adding that it would also accelerate e-commerce. Infosys founder N. R. Narayana Murthy praised the move.

Deepak Parekh (Chairman of HDFC) had initially appreciated the decision of demonetisation, but later said that the move had derailed the economy, and expressed skepticism about its outcome. Industrialist Rajiv Bajaj criticised demonetisation, saying that not just the execution, but the concept of demonetisation was wrong in itself.

=== Political reactions ===
Indian National Congress spokesperson Randeep Surjewala welcomed the move but remained skeptical on the consequences that would follow. Chief Minister of Bihar Nitish Kumar supported the move. The demonetisation also got support from the then Chief Minister of Andhra Pradesh Nara Chandrababu Naidu. Former Chief Election Commissioner of India S. Y. Quraishi said demonetisation could lead to long term electoral reforms. Indian social activist Anna Hazare hailed demonetisation as a "revolutionary step". Former President of India Pranab Mukherjee welcomed the demonetisation move by calling it a "bold step". Chief Ministers of several Indian states like Mamata Banerjee, Arvind Kejriwal and Pinarayi Vijayan have criticised and led major protests against the decision in their states and in parliament. Initially, the move to demonetise and try to hinder black money was appreciated, but the manner in which it was carried out by causing hardships to common people was criticised.

A Parliamentary panel report in April 2017 stated that rural households and "honest taxpayers" were the worst hit by demonetisation. It said that it was not just the poor that suffered, but the manufacturing sector was impacted too. According to the panel, demonetisation created significant disruption throughout economy, because it was carried out without prior study or research. An Indian National Congress led opposition which includes 13 political parties, opposed the government on the issue of demonetisation in the Winter Session of the Indian Parliament.

On 16 November 2016, Mamata Banerjee led a delegation comprising political parties of Trinamool Congress, Aam Aadmi Party, BJP ally Shiv Sena and National Conference to Rashtrapati Bhawan to protest against the demonetisation. A memorandum was submitted to the President of India Pranab Mukherjee demanding rollback of the decision.

Prem Chand Gupta, a member of the Rashtriya Janata Dal, questioned a statement of Modi from the unscheduled TV broadcast on 8 November, "If it was planned 10 months ago, how did RBI Governor Urjit Patel sign on new note?". Praful Patel, a member of the Nationalist Congress Party, stated that "the government was not even prepared to recalibrate the ATMs while announcing the move. People's suffering are unimaginable. Nobody is questioning the government's intention, but you are unprepared to execute the move". Later, the former Chief Minister of Uttar Pradesh Mayawati called the situation "a financial emergency", saying, "It looks as if Bharat has shut down." Also, Sitaram Yechury from the Communist Party of India, questioned the government on the demonetisation move by stating "only 6% of black money in India is in cash to drive his point that demonetisation won't curb illicit wealth."

On 17 November 2016, Chief Minister of Delhi Arvind Kejriwal and his West Bengal counterpart Mamata Banerjee led a rally against demonetisation at Azadpur Mandi, the biggest vegetable and fruits wholesale market in New Delhi.

On 24 November 2016, former prime minister Manmohan Singh said "this scheme will hurt small industries, the farming sector. The GDP can decline by about 3 percent due to this move". He called the demonetisation an "organised loot, legalised plunder of the common people".

Strikes were organised across India. Opposition parties like the Indian National Congress, Bahujan Samaj Party, Trinamool Congress, DMK, JD(U), AIADMK, Nationalist Congress Party, Left, Rashtriya Janata Dal and the Samajwadi Party decided to observe 'Akrosh Diwas' as, a protest campaign day on 28 November and launch protests in front of banks, demanding that money be returned to people. In the state of Bihar, 15 trains were blocked and stranded, while the states of West Bengal, Maharashtra and Uttar Pradesh saw protest marches and rallies led by opposition parties. In the state of Kerala, shops and business establishments were shut, with schools and colleges closed throughout the state, while movements of private vehicles were also disrupted in Northern Kerala.

Former Indian Chief Election Commissioner, O. P. Rawat stated that 'the note ban had absolutely no impact on black money', and that record amounts of money had been seized in polls held after demonetisation.

=== International reactions ===
By and large, initial international response was positive which saw the move as a bold crackdown on corruption. The International Monetary Fund's spokesperson Gerry Rice told that it supported the efforts to fight corruption and illegal finances but cautioned about the disruptions.

Chinese state media Global Times praised the move as a "fierce fight against black money and corruption." Former Prime Minister of Finland and vice-president of European Commission Jyrki Katainen welcomed the demonetisation move stressing that bringing transparency will strengthen the Indian economy. BBC's South Asia Correspondent Justin Rowlatt in his article praised the move for its secrecy. Tim Worstall wrote in Forbes that demonetisation was having positive macroeconomic effects. Swedish Minister of Enterprise Mikael Damberg supported the move by calling it a bold decision.

The demonetisation also came in for sharp criticism from media outside India, with The New York Times saying that the demonetisation was "atrociously planned" and that it did not appear to have combatted black money, while an article in The Guardian stated that "Modi has brought havoc to India". The Harvard Business Review called it "a case study in poor policy and even poorer execution". The frequent change in the narrative on objectives of the demonetisation to its visible impact on the poorest of the poor made other critiques calling the government's narrative as spins in view of the "pointless suffering on India's poorest."

== Political impact ==
Akshay Mangala, an assistant professor at Harvard Business School, called the move "the politics of visible disruption". He noted that the people might attribute the implementation shortcomings to institutional weakness while the government could take credit for its attempt to curb the black money. He also noted that it may result in the public opinion in favour of the government which is led by the BJP if the opposition parties, led by the INC, fail to form the countervailing narrative. Massachusetts Institute of Technology associated academics Abhijit Banerjee and Namrata Kala also opined the same.

The BJP and its allies formed the government in six out of seven state legislative assemblies which went to the elections in 2017, including the most populous state, Uttar Pradesh. BJP improved its performance in Uttarakhand and Himachal Pradesh. In Manipur and Goa, INC secured the plurality while BJP came second and formed the government with the help of its allies. In Gujarat, BJP worsened its performance but retained the majority. The BJP and its allies lost to the INC in Punjab.

== Long term impact ==
According to the RBI, more than 99% of the demonetised banknotes were back with the banks, leading to widespread speculation about the effectiveness of the entire exercise. In 2019, India experienced an economic slowdown which was attributed to demonetisation and several other factors.

During the COVID-19 pandemic, there was an increase in digital payments. The general rise in digital payments and cashless transactions has been attributed to the demonetisation. Although data released by RBI in Nov 2021 showed that cash circulation in India has actually increased significantly since demonetisation and demonetisation has not necessarily converted cash users to digital users.

As of November 2021, further increases in digital payments and bank notes in circulation have been seen. It is reported by media outlets that GDP estimation methodologies have also been changed by the Finance Ministry post-demonetisation, allegedly to make the estimates look more promising.

In 2023, the RBI issued orders to restrict and eventually end the supply of ₹2000 bank notes. The RBI's official explanation for this decision was that lower denomination notes are in adequate circulation and that these currency notes are not commonly used for transactions. These measures were predicted to unilaterally affect small and medium enterprises, and the RBI's position has drawn criticism from several independent thinkers.

== In popular culture ==
- Puthan Panam, a 2017 film directed by Renjith based on the issue of black money and demonetisation.
- Sherlock Toms, a 2017 Malayalam film revolves around demonetisation.
- Aadu 2, a 2017 Malayalam film revolves around demonetisation.
- Golak Bugni Bank Te Batua, a 2018 Punjabi film also revolves around demonetisation.
- Chappad Phaad Ke, a 2019 Disney+ Hotstar film revolves around demonetisation
- Choked, a 2020 Netflix film directed by Anurag Kashyap is set in backdrop of demonetisation.
- Cash, a 2021 Disney+ Hotstar film
- Avrodh: The Siege Within 2, a 2022 web series on SonyLIV
- Dhurandhar: The Revenge, a 2026 Hindi film, the film's sub-plot is based on the same

== See also ==
- Indian black money
- Mahatma Gandhi New Series
- Income declaration scheme, 2016
- Pradhan Mantri Garib Kalyan Yojana
