= Indian 5-rupee note =

Indian banknote

Five rupee
- Country: India
- Value: ₹5
- Width: 117 mm
- Height: 63 mm
- Security features: Watermark
- Years of printing: 1938 to 2011

Obverse

Reverse
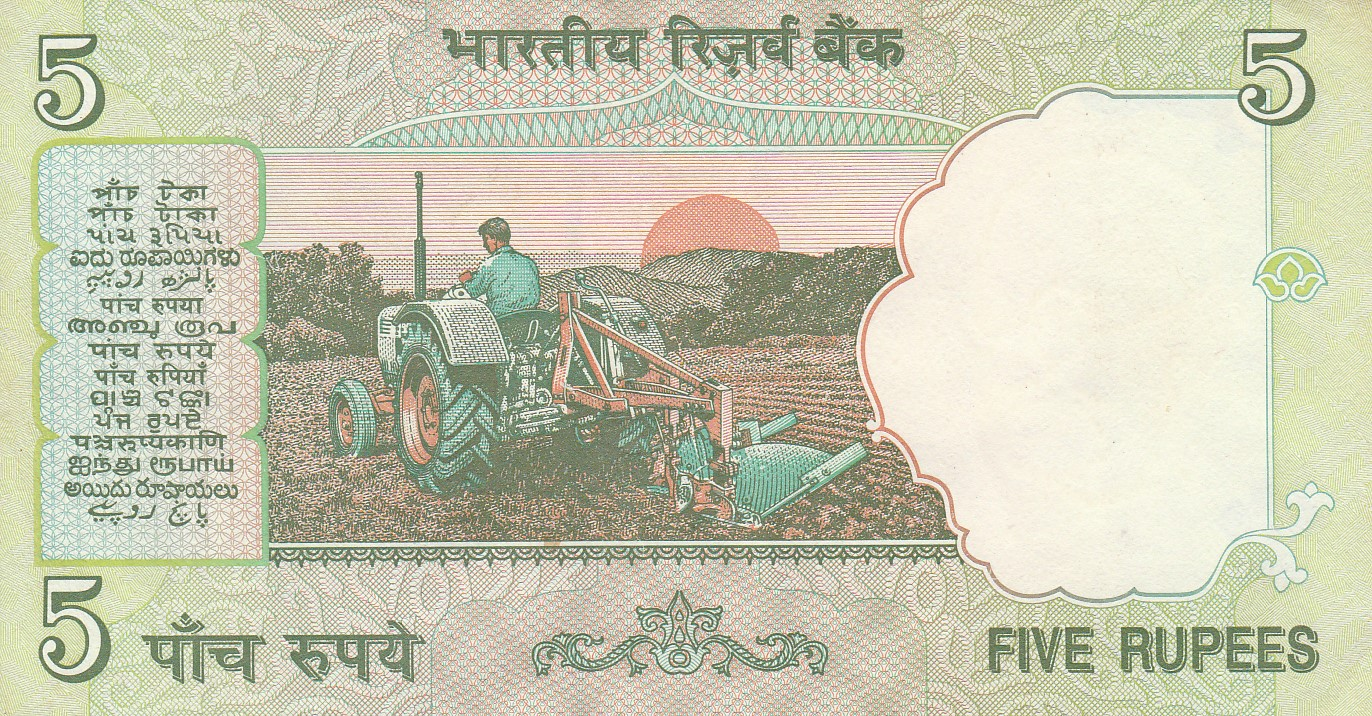

The Indian 5-rupee note (₹5) is the second smallest Indian note in circulation. The Reserve Bank of India introduced the 5 rupee banknote as part of the George V Series, but was mainly printed after independence in the Lion Capital Series. The printing of notes in the denominations of ₹5, however, has been discontinued as these denominations have been coinised but still these notes are valid legal tender in India.

== Languages ==
As like the other Indian rupee banknotes, the ₹5 banknote has its amount written in 17 languages. On the obverse, the denomination is written in English and Hindi. On the reverse is a language panel which displays the denomination of the note in 15 of the 22 official languages of India. The languages are displayed in alphabetical order. Languages included on the panel are Assamese, Bengali, Gujarati, Kannada, Kashmiri, Konkani, Malayalam, Marathi, Nepali, Odia, Punjabi, Sanskrit, Tamil, Telugu and Urdu.

Denominations in central level official languages (At below either ends)
Language	₹5
English	Five rupees
Hindi	पाँच रुपये
Denominations in 15 state level/other official languages (As seen on the language panel)
Assamese	পাঁচ টকা
Bengali	পাঁচ টাকা
Gujarati	પાંચ રૂપિયા
Kannada	ಐದು ರೂಪಾಯಿಗಳು
Kashmiri	پانٛژھ رۄپیہِ
Konkani	पांच रुपया
Malayalam	അഞ്ചു രൂപ
Marathi	पाच रुपये
Nepali	पाँच रुपियाँ
Odia	ପାଞ୍ଚ ଟଙ୍କା
Punjabi	ਪੰਜ ਰੁਪਏ
Sanskrit	पञ्चरूप्यकाणि
Tamil	ஐந்து ரூபாய்
Telugu	ఐదు రూపాయలు
Urdu	پانچ روپیے

== See also ==
- Indian 2-rupee note
- Indian 5-rupee coin
