= Indian 20-rupee note =

Denomination of the Indian rupee

Twenty rupees
- Country: India
- Value: ₹20 (approx. $0.27)
- Width: 129 mm
- Height: 63 mm
- Security features: Security thread, latent image, micro-lettering, intaglio print, fluorescent ink, optically variable ink, watermark, and see through registration device.
- Years of printing: April 2019 – present

Obverse
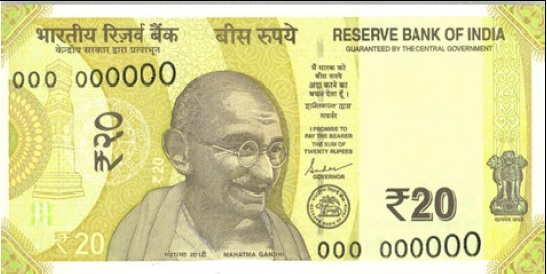
- Design: Mahatma Gandhi
- Designer: Reserve Bank of India
- Design date: 2019; 7 years ago

Reverse
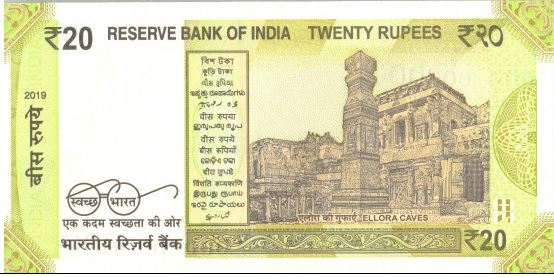
- Design: Ellora Caves
- Designer: Reserve Bank of India
- Design date: 2019; 7 years ago

The Indian 20-rupee banknote (₹20) is a common denomination of the Indian rupee. The current ₹20 banknote in circulation is a part of the Mahatma Gandhi New Series. The Reserve Bank introduced the ₹20 note in the Mahatma Gandhi New Series in 2019, making it the last denomination to be introduced in the series.

It was first introduced by the Reserve Bank of India in 1972 to contain the cost of production of banknotes in circulation. With the introduction of this banknote, the Reserve Bank started a major redesign of the motif of the Lion Capital Series banknotes.

== Mahatma Gandhi New Series ==
On 10 November 2016, the then Economic Affairs Secretary Shaktikanta Das announced a new ₹20 banknote would be released in the Mahatma Gandhi New Series in the coming months.

The Reserve Bank of India has announced on 26 April 2019 that it would shortly issue a new ₹20 note. The new denomination has a motif of Ellora Caves on the back, a UNESCO World Heritage site in Aurangabad district, Maharashtra, India on the reverse, depicting the country's cultural heritage continuing with the theme in Mahatma Gandhi New Series banknotes. Size of the bank note will be 129 mm × 63 mm. This is used alongside to the new Indian 20-rupee coin.

== History ==
Indian Twenty rupees note

=== Lion Capital series ===
==== Design ====
The obverse side featured the Lion Capital. The reverse side featured the chariot wheel of the Konark Sun Temple.

=== Mahatma Gandhi Series ===
==== Design ====
The ₹20 banknote of the Mahatma Gandhi Series is 129 × 63 mm red-orange coloured, with the obverse side featuring a portrait of Mahatma Gandhi with a signature of the governor of Reserve Bank of India. It has the Braille feature to assist the visually challenged in identifying the currency. The reverse side features the famous Mount Harriet in Andaman and Nicobar Islands.

As of 2012, the new ₹ sign has been incorporated into banknote of ₹20. In January 2014 RBI announced that it would be withdrawing from circulation all banknotes printed prior to 2005 by 31 March 2014. The deadline was later extended to 1 January 2015. Now further dead line was extended to 30 June 2016.

==== Security features ====
The security features of the ₹20 banknote include:

- A windowed security thread that reads 'भारत' (Bharat in the Devanagari script) and 'RBI' alternately.
- Latent image of the value of the banknote on the vertical band next to the right hand side of Mahatma Gandhi's portrait.
- Watermark of Mahatma Gandhi that is a mirror image of the main portrait.
- The number panel of the banknote is printed in embedded fluorescent fibers and optically variable ink.
- Since 2005 additional security features like machine-readable security thread, electrotype watermark, and year of print appear on the bank note.

== Languages ==
As like the other Indian rupee banknotes, the ₹20 banknote has its amount written in 17 languages. On the obverse, the denomination is written in English and Hindi. On the reverse is a language panel which displays the denomination of the note in 15 of the 22 official languages of India. The languages are displayed in alphabetical order. Languages included on the panel are Assamese, Bengali, Gujarati, Kannada, Kashmiri, Konkani, Malayalam, Marathi, Nepali, Odia, Punjabi, Sanskrit, Tamil, Telugu and Urdu.

Text of amount in various languages
Language	Amount
In central level official languages (At below either ends)
English	Twenty rupees
Hindi	बीस रुपये
In 15 state level/other official languages (on the language panel)
Assamese	বিছ টকা
Bengali	কুড়ি টাকা
Gujarati	વીસ રૂપિયા
Kannada	ಇಪ್ಪತ್ತು ರುಪಾಯಿಗಳು
Kashmiri	وُہ رۄپیہِ
Konkani	वीस रुपया
Malayalam	ഇരുപത് രൂപ
Marathi	वीस रुपये
Nepali	बीस रुपियाँ
Odia	କୋଡ଼ିଏ ଟଙ୍କା
Punjabi	ਵੀਹ ਰੁਪਏ
Sanskrit	विंशती रूप्यकाणि
Tamil	இருபது ரூபாய்
Telugu	ఇరవై రూపాయలు
Urdu	بیس روپیے
