= Indian rupee =

Currency of India

Scheduled official languages:
- - Assamese: ভাৰতীয় টকা
  - Bengali: ভারতীয় টাকা
  - Bodo: भारतारी रां
  - Dogri: भारतीय रुपया
  - Gujarati: ભારતીય રૂપિયો
  - Hindi: भारतीय रुपया
  - Kannada: ಭಾರತೀಯ ರೂಪಾಯಿ
  - Kashmiri: ہِندوستٲنؠ رۄپَے
  - Konkani: भारतीय रुपया
  - Maithili: भारतीय रुपया
  - Malayalam: ഭാരതീയ രൂപ
  - Marathi: भारतीय रुपया
  - Meitei: ꯚꯥꯔꯠꯀꯤ ꯂꯨꯄꯥ
  - Nepali: भारतीय रुपैयाँ
  - Odia: ଭାରତୀୟ ଟଙ୍କା
  - Punjabi: ਭਾਰਤੀ ਰੁਪਿਆ
  - Sanskrit: भारतीय रुपये
  - Santali: ᱵᱷᱟᱨᱚᱛᱤᱭᱚ ᱴᱟᱠᱟ
  - Sindhi: هندستاني روپيو
  - Tamil: இந்திய ரூபாய்
  - Telugu: భారత రూపాయి
  - Urdu: ہندوستانی روپیہ
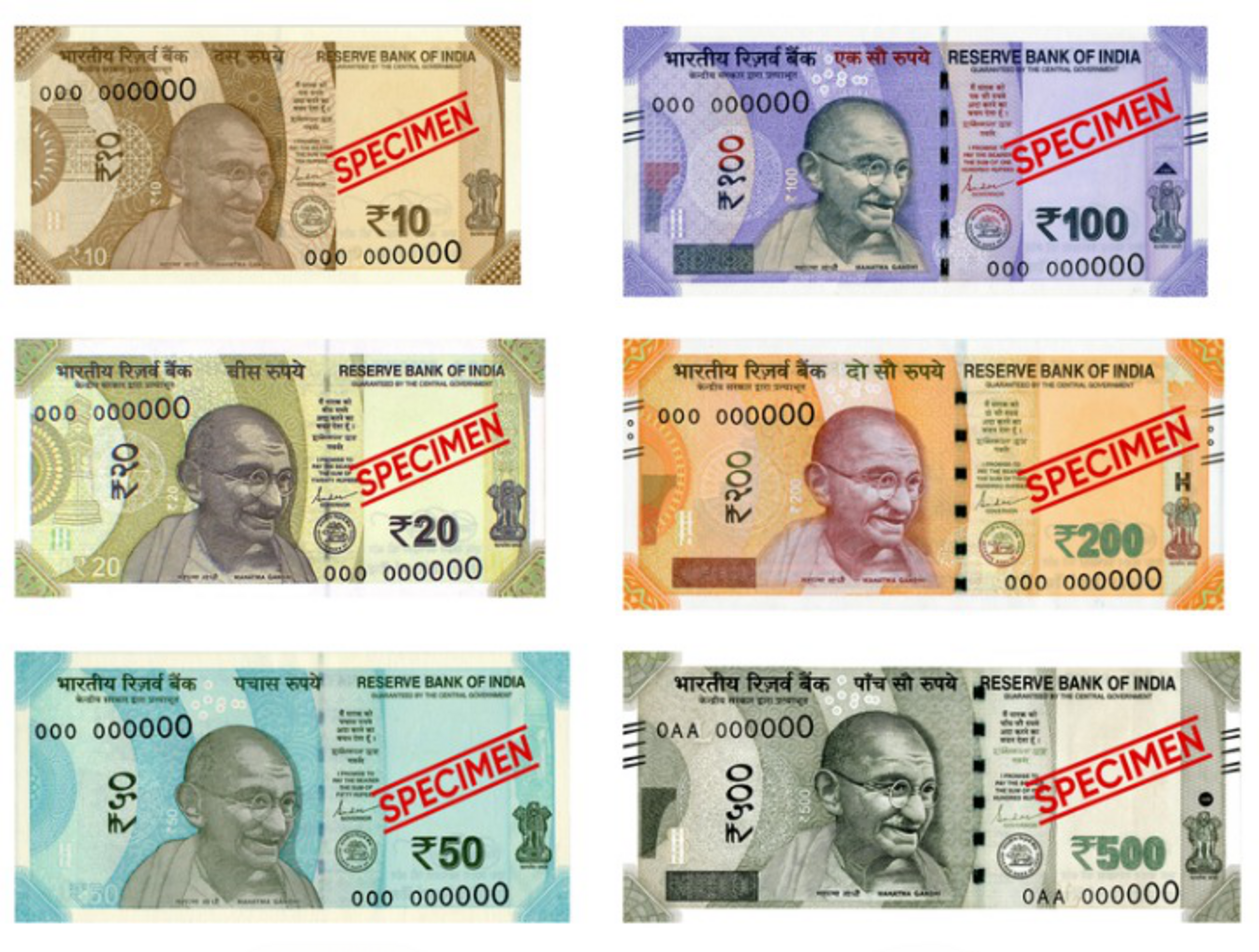
Banknotes of the Indian rupee
Coins of the Indian rupee

ISO 4217
- Code: INR (numeric: 356)
- Subunit: 0.01

Units of account
- Base unit: rupee
- Symbol: ₹
- Subunit
- 1/100: paisa
- Symbol

Denominations
- Banknotes
- Freq. used: ₹10, ₹20, ₹50, ₹100, ₹200, ₹500
- Rarely used: ₹1, ₹2, ₹5
- Coins
- Freq. used: ₹1, ₹2, ₹5, ₹10, ₹20
- Rarely used: 50 (discontinued, but still legal tender for amounts up to ₹10)

Demographics
- Date of introduction: 1835; 191 years ago
- Replaced: Mohur (1835); British Indian Rupee (Since 1947)
- Official user(s): India; Bhutan
- Unofficial users: Nepal; Zimbabwe; Sri Lanka

Issuance
- Central bank: Reserve Bank of India
- Website: www.rbi.org.in
- Printer: Security Printing and Minting Corporation of India Limited
- Website: spmcil.com
- Mint: India Government Mint
- Website: indiagovtmint.in

Valuation
- Inflation: ▼3.4% (September 2024)
- Source: RBI – Annual Inflation Report
- Method: Consumer price index (India)
- Pegged by: Bhutanese ngultrum (at par); Nepalese rupee (₹1 = रु1.60)

The Indian rupee (symbol: ₹; code: INR) is the official currency of India and the erstwhile Dominion of India and British Raj. The rupee is subdivided into 100 paise (singular: paisa). The issuance of the currency is controlled by the Reserve Bank of India. The Reserve Bank derives this role from powers vested in it by the Reserve Bank of India Act, 1934. It is the world's eleventh-most-traded currency as of April 2025.

== Etymology ==
Pāṇini (6th to 4th century BCE), the ancient Indian grammarian and logician, writes of the rūpya (रूप्य). While it is unclear whether Pāṇini was referring specifically to coinage, some scholars conclude that he uses the term rūpa to mean a piece of precious metal (typically silver) used as a coin, and a rūpya to mean a stamped piece of metal, a coin in the modern sense. The Arthashastra, written by Chanakya, prime minister to the first Maurya emperor Chandragupta Maurya (c. 340–290 BCE), mentions silver coins as rūpyarūpa. Other types of coins, including gold coins (suvarṇarūpa), copper coins (tāmrarūpa), and lead coins (sīsarūpa), are also mentioned. The immediate precursor to the rupee is the rūpiya—the silver coin weighing 178 grains minted in northern India, first by Sher Shah Suri during his brief rule between 1540 and 1545, and later by the Mughal Empire. The weight remained unchanged well beyond the end of Mughal rule into the 20th century.

== History ==
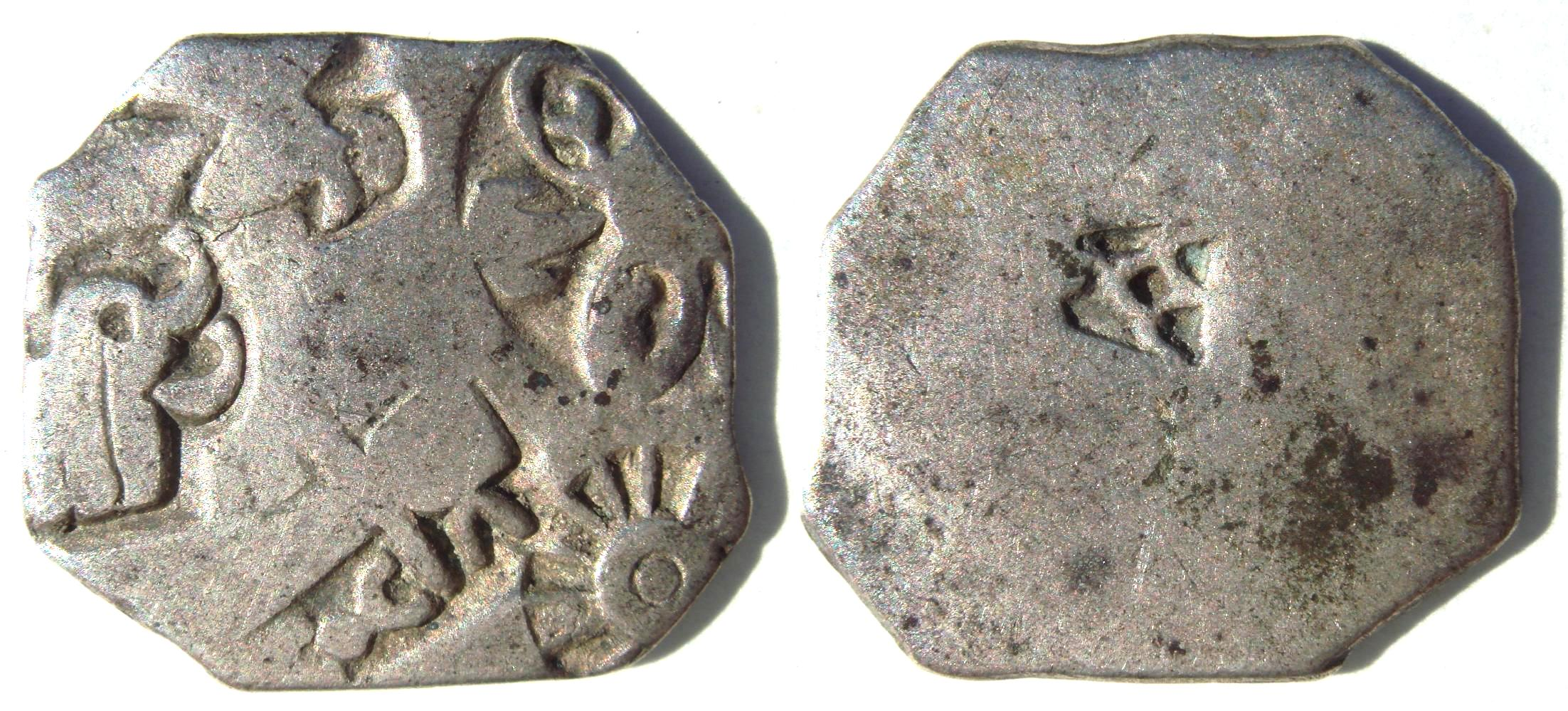
Silver punch mark coin of the Maurya Empire, known as Rūpyarūpa, 3rd century BCE

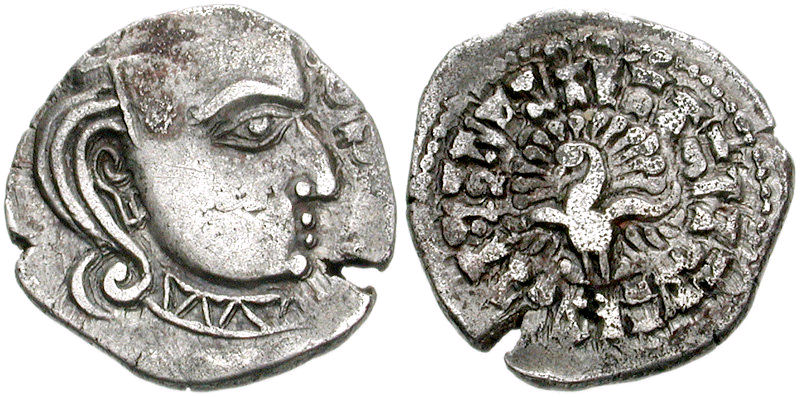
Silver coin of Skandagupta of Gupta Empire known as Rūpaka (रूपक) in Sanskrit, in the style of the Western Satraps, with peacock on reverse, 455—467

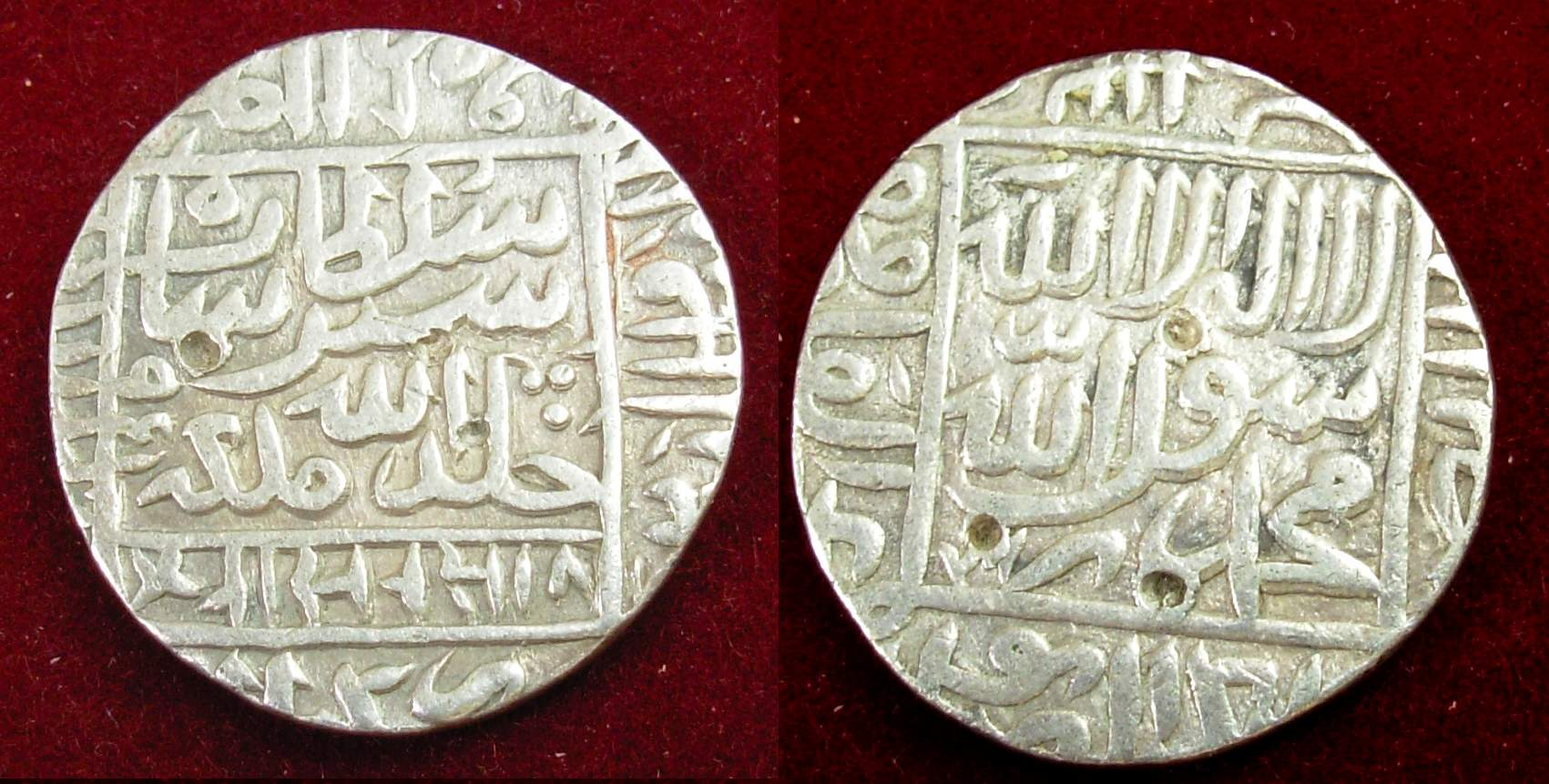
Rupiya issued by Sher Shah Suri, 1540–1545

The history of the Indian rupee traces back to ancient India around the 6th century BCE; ancient India was one of the earliest issuers of coins in the world, alongside the Chinese wen and Lydian staters.

Arthashastra, written by Chanakya, the prime minister to the first Mauryan emperor Chandragupta Maurya (c. 340–290 BCE), mentions silver coins as rūpyarūpa, gold coins as suvarṇarūpa, copper coins as tamrarūpa, and lead coins as sīsarūpa. Rūpa means 'shape' or 'form'.

The Gupta Empire under Chandragupta II produced large numbers of silver coins clearly influenced by those of the earlier Western Satraps. The silver Rūpaka (Sanskrit: रूपक) coins weighed approximately 20 rattis (2.2678 g).

In the intermediate times following the Guptas, there appears to have been no fixed monetary system of coinage as reported in the travelogue Da Tang Xi Yu Ji.

During his five-year rule from 1540 to 1545, Sultan Sher Shah Suri issued a coin of silver, weighing 178 grains (or 11.53 grams), which was also termed the rupiya. During Babur's time, the brass to silver exchange ratio was roughly 50:2. The silver coin remained in use during the Mughal period, the Maratha era as well as in British India. Some of the earliest issuers of paper rupees include the Bank of Hindustan (1770–1832), the General Bank of Bengal and Bihar (1773–1775, established by Warren Hastings), and the Bengal Bank (1784–91).

=== 1800s ===
Indian silver rupee value (1820–1900)
Year	Exchange rate (pence per rupee)	Melt value (pence per rupee)
1850	24.3	22.7
1851	24.1	22.7
1852	23.9	22.5
1853	24.1	22.8
1854	23.1	22.8
1855	24.2	22.8
1856	24.2	22.8
1857	24.6	22.9
1858	25.7	22.8
1859	26.0	23.0
1860	26.0	22.9
1861	23.9	22.6
1862	23.9	22.8
1863	23.9	22.8
1864	23.9	22.8
1865	23.8	22.7
1866	23.1	22.7
1867	23.2	22.5
1868	23.2	22.5
1869	23.3	22.5
1870	22.5	22.5
1871	23.1	22.5
1872	22.7	22.4
1873	22.3	22.0
1874	22.1	21.6
1875	21.6	21.1
1876	20.5	19.6
1877	20.8	20.4
1878	19.8	19.5
1879	20.0	19.0
1880	19.9	19.4
1881	19.9	19.2
1882	19.5	19.3
1883	19.5	18.7
1884	19.3	18.8
1885	18.2	18.0
1886	17.4	16.8
1887	16.9	16.6
1888	16.4	15.9
1889	16.5	15.8
1890	18.0	17.7
1891	16.7	16.7
1892	15.0	14.8
1893	14.5	13.2
1894	13.1	10.7
1895	13.6	11.1
1896	14.4	11.5
1897	15.3	10.2
1898	16.0	10.0
1899	16.0	10.2
1900	16.0	10.4

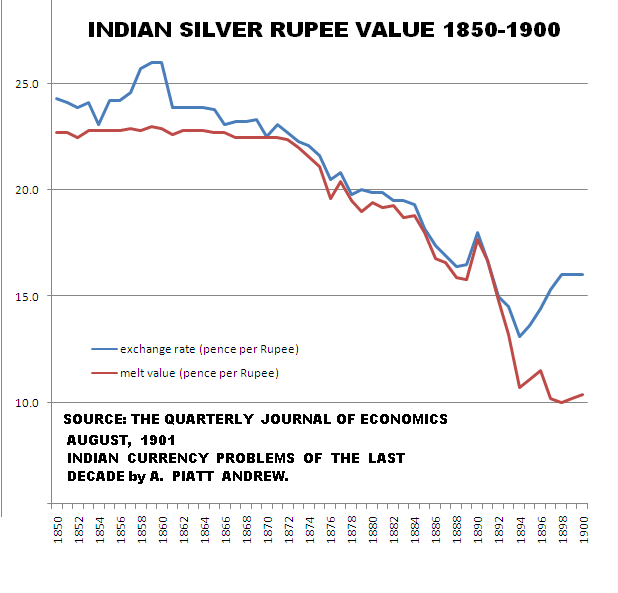
Chart showing exchange rate of Indian silver rupee coin (blue) and the actual value of its silver content (red), against British pence (from 1850 to 1900)

Historically, the rupee was a silver coin. This had severe consequences in the nineteenth century when the strongest economies in the world were on the gold standard (that is, paper linked to gold). The discovery of large quantities of silver in the United States and several European colonies caused the panic of 1873 which resulted in a decline in the value of silver relative to gold, devaluing India's standard currency, an event known as "the fall of the rupee". Following the panic, the world descended into a 'Long Depression', which resulted in bankruptcies, escalating unemployment, a halt in public works, and a major trade slump that lasted until 1897.

India was unaffected by the imperial order-in-council of 1825, which attempted to introduce British sterling coinage to the British colonies. India, at that time, was controlled by the British East India Company. The silver rupee coin continued as the currency of India through the British Raj and beyond. In 1835, British India adopted a mono-metallic silver standard based on the rupee coin; this decision was influenced by a letter written by Lord Liverpool in 1805 extolling the virtues of mono-metallism.

Following the Sepoy Rebellion in 1857, the British government took direct control of India. From 1851, gold sovereigns were produced en masse at the Royal Mint in Sydney. In an 1864 attempt to make the British gold sovereign the "imperial coin", the treasuries in Bombay and Calcutta were instructed to receive (but not to issue) gold sovereigns; therefore, these gold sovereigns never left the vaults. As the British government gave up hope of replacing the rupee in India with the pound sterling, a conclusion was reached that it could not replace the silver dollar in the Straits Settlements with the Indian rupee (as the British East India Company had desired). Since the silver crisis of 1873, several nations switched over to a gold exchange standard (wherein silver or banknotes circulate locally but with a fixed gold value for export purposes), including India in the 1890s.

=== India Council Bill ===
In 1870, India was connected to Britain by a submarine telegraph cable. Around 1875, Britain started paying India for exported goods in India Council (paper) bills (instead of silver).

If, therefore, the India Council in London should not step in to sell bills on India, the merchants and bankers would have to send silver to make good the (trade) balances. Thus a channel for the outflow of silver was stopped, in 1875, by the India Council in London.

The great importance of these (Council) Bills, however, is the effect they have on the Market Price of Silver: and they have in fact been one of the most potent factors in recent years in causing the diminution in the Value of Silver as compared to Gold.

The Indian and Chinese products for which silver is paid were and are, since 1873–74, very low in price, and it therefore takes less silver to purchase a larger quantity of Eastern commodities. Now, on taking the several agents into united consideration, it will certainly not seem very mysterious why silver should not only have fallen in price

The great nations had recourse to two expedients for replenishing their exchequers, – first, loans, and, second, the more convenient forced loans of paper money۔

=== Fowler Committee (1898) ===
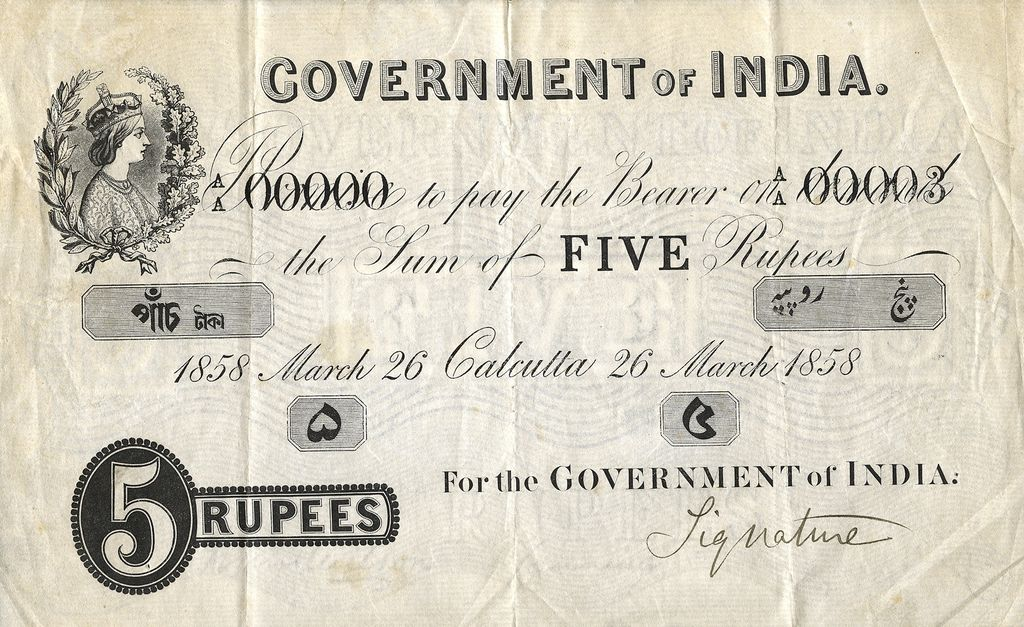
Government of India - 5-rupee note (1858)

The Indian Currency Committee or Fowler Committee was a government committee appointed by the British-run Government of India on 29 April 1898 to examine the currency situation in India. They collected a wide range of testimony, examined as many as 49 witnesses, and only reported their conclusions in July 1899, after more than a year's deliberation.

The prophecy made before the Committee of 1898 by Mr. A. M. Lindsay, in proposing a scheme closely similar in principle to that which was eventually adopted, has been largely fulfilled. "This change," he said, "will pass unnoticed, except by the intelligent few, and it is satisfactory to find that by this almost imperceptible process, the Indian currency will be placed on a footing which Ricardo and other great authorities have advocated as the best of all currency systems, viz., one in which the currency media used in the internal circulation are confined to notes and cheap token coins, which are made to act precisely as if they were bits of gold by being made convertible into gold for foreign payment purposes. The committee concurred in the opinion of the Indian government that the mints should remain closed to the unrestricted coinage of silver and that a gold standard should be adopted without delay...they recommended (1) that the British sovereign be given full legal tender power in India, and (2) that the Indian mints be thrown open to its unrestricted coinage (for gold coins only).

These recommendations were acceptable to both governments and were shortly afterwards translated into laws. The act making gold a legal tender was promulgated on 15 September 1899, and preparations were soon thereafter undertaken for the coinage of gold sovereigns in the mint at Bombay.

Silver, therefore, has ceased to serve as, and standard; and the Indian currency system of to-day (that is 1901) may be described as that of a "limping" gold standard similar to the systems of France, Germany, and Holland, and the United States.

The Committee of 1898 explicitly declared themselves to be in favour of the eventual establishment of a gold currency.
This goal, if it was their goal, the Government of India have never attained.

=== 1900s ===
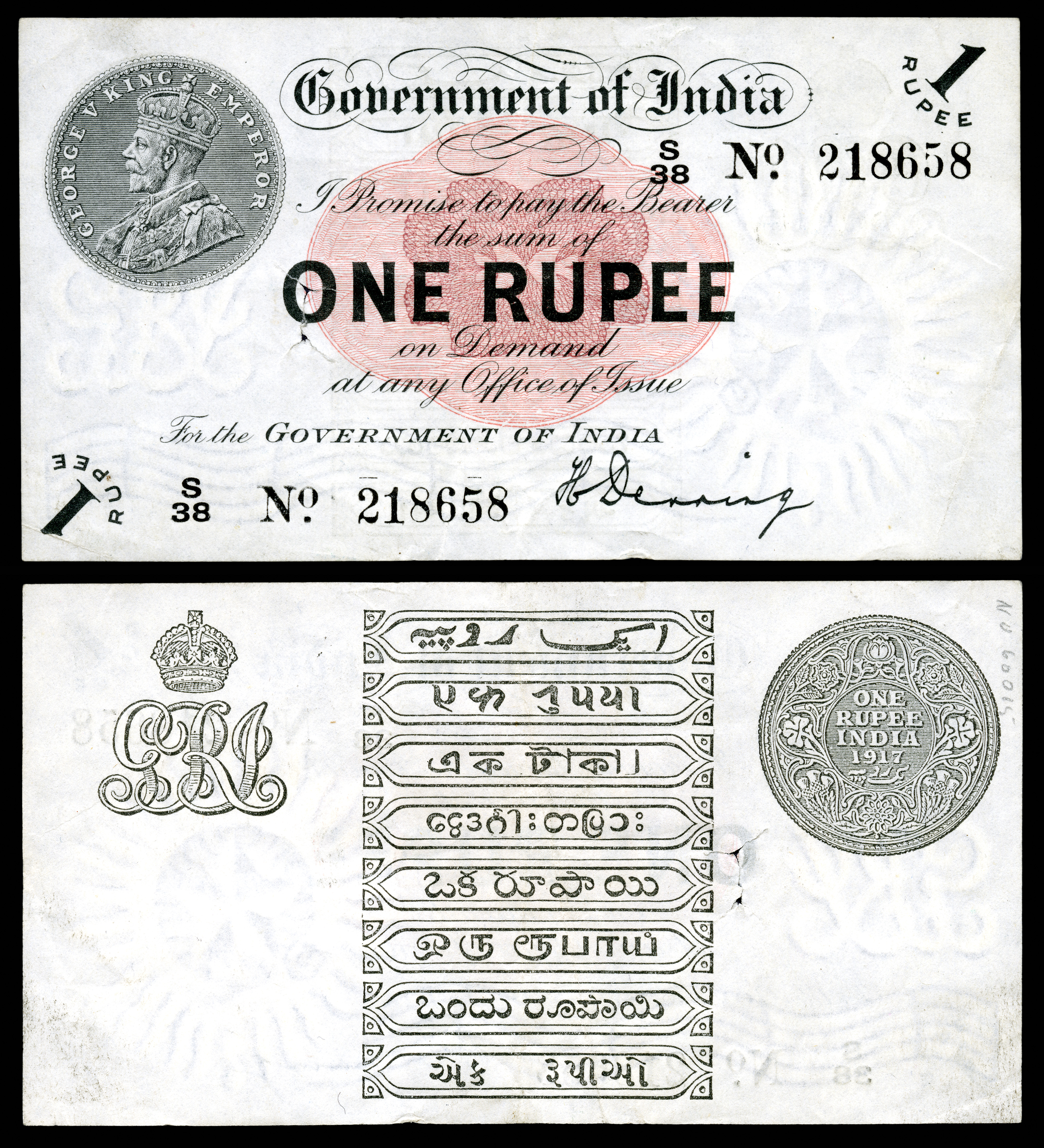
Government of India – 1 rupee (1917)

In 1913, John Maynard Keynes writes in his book Indian Currency and Finance that during the financial year 1900–1901, gold coins (sovereigns) worth £6,750,000 were given to the Indian people in the hope that they would circulate as currency. But against the expectation of the Government, not even half of that was returned to accounts. As this experiment failed spectacularly, the government abandoned the practice but did not abandon the narrative of the gold standard. Subsequently, much of the gold held by the Government of India was shipped to the Bank of England in 1901 and held there.

During World War II, Colonial British control over parts of Nagaland was lost to Japanese forces, the British Indian rupee was banned and the Japanese rupee (1942–44) was introduced.

In the autumn of 1917 (when the silver price rose to 55 pence), there was danger of uprisings in India (against paper currency) which would handicap seriously British participation in the war. Inconvertibility (of paper currency into silver coin) would lead to a run on Post Office Savings Banks. It would prevent the further expansion of (paper currency) note issues and cause a rise of prices, in paper currency, that would greatly increase the cost of obtaining war supplies for export; to have reduced the silver content of this historic [rupee] coin might well have caused such popular distrust of the Government as to have precipitated an internal crisis, which would have been fatal to British success in the war... and the Government could not afford to buy silver at 55 pence per ounce to coin into rupees with a bullion parity of 43.1 pence per ounce. To let silver be replaced by gold, as Mexico had done in 1906, was also impossible, for the world had no gold to spare. The Government, therefore, did the only possible thing, and raised the value of the (silver) rupee in terms of gold...

=== Problems caused by the gold standard ===
At the onset of the First World War, the cost of gold was very low and therefore the pound sterling (silver) had high value. But during the war, the value of the pound fell alarmingly due to rising war expenses. At the end of the war, the value of the pound was only a fraction of what it had been before the war. It remained low until 1925, when the then Chancellor of the Exchequer (finance minister) of the United Kingdom, Winston Churchill, restored it to pre-war levels. As a result, the price of gold fell rapidly. While the rest of Europe purchased large quantities of gold from the United Kingdom, there was little increase in her gold reserves (in United Kingdom). This dealt a blow to an already deteriorating British economy. The United Kingdom began to look to its possessions as India to compensate for the gold that was sold.

However, the price of gold in India, on the basis of the official exchange rate of the (silver) rupee around 1s. 6d., was lower than the price prevailing abroad practically throughout; the disparity in prices made the export of the (gold) metal profitable; and this continued for almost a decade. Thus, in 1931–32, there were net exports of 7.7 million ounces, valued at INR 57.98 crore. In the following year, both the quantity and the price rose further: net exports totalled 8.4 million ounces, valued at INR 65.52 crore. In the ten years ended March 1941, total net exports were of the order of 43 million ounces (1337.3 tons (of gold)) valued at about INR 375 crore, or an average price of INR 32-12-4 per tola.

From 1931 to 1941, the United Kingdom purchased large amounts of gold from India and its many other colonies just by increasing price of gold, as Britain was able to pay in printable paper currency. Similarly, on 19 June 1934, Roosevelt made Silver Purchase Act (which increased the price of silver) and purchased about 44,000 tons of silver, paying with paper silver certificates.

In 1939, Dickson H. Leavens wrote in his book Silver Money: "In recent years the increased price of gold, measured in depreciated paper currencies, has attracted to the market (of London) large quantities (of gold) formerly hoarded or held in the form of ornaments in India and China".

In their respective former colonies, the Indian rupee replaced the Danish Indian rupee in 1845, the French Indian rupee in 1954 and the Portuguese Indian escudo in 1961. Following the independence of India in 1947 and the accession of the princely states to the new Union, the Indian rupee replaced all the currencies of the previously autonomous states (although the Hyderabadi rupee was not demonetised until 1959). Some of the states had issued rupees equal to those issued by the British (such as the Travancore rupee). Other currencies (including the Hyderabadi rupee and the Kutch kori) had different values.

The values of the subdivisions of the rupee during British rule (and in the first decade of independence) were:

Subdivisions of the rupee during the 20th century
Value (in anna)	Popular name	Value (in paise)
16 anna	1 rupee	100 paise
8 anna	1 ardharupee / 1 athanni (dheli)	50 paise
4 anna	1 pavala / 1 chawanni	25 paise
2 anna	1 beda / 1 duanni	12 paise
1 anna	1 ekanni	6 paise
1/2 anna	1 paraka / 1 taka / 1 adhanni	3 paise
1/4 anna	1 kani (pice) / 1 paisa (old paise)	1 1/2 paise
1/8 anna	1 dhela	3/4 paisa
1/12 anna	1 pie	1/2 paisa

- In 1957, the rupee was decimalised and divided into 100 naye paise (Hindi for "new paise"); in 1964, the initial naye was dropped.
- Many still refer to 25-, 50- and 75-paise coins as 4, 8, and 12 annas, respectively; compare the expression "two bits" in colloquial American English for a quarter-dollar coin.

=== New currency sign for the Indian rupee ===
In 2010, a new rupee sign (₹) was officially adopted. As its designer explained, it was derived from the combination of the Devanagari consonant "र" (ra) and the Latin capital letter "R" without its vertical bar. The parallel lines at the top (with white space between them) are said to make an allusion to the flag of India, and also depict an equality sign that symbolises the nation's desire to reduce economic disparity. The first series of coins with the new rupee sign started in circulation on 8 July 2011. Before this, India used "₨" and "Re" as the symbols for multiple rupees and one rupee, respectively, and these symbols are still used in situations where the official symbol is unavailable. At an international level, like India, some nations' currencies are also Rupees. When the (₹) symbol is unavailable, then INR is used to represent the Indian currency.

=== Digitization of Indian rupee ===
The digital rupee (e₹), eINR, or e-rupee is a tokenised digital version of the Indian rupee, issued by the Reserve Bank of India (RBI) as a central bank digital currency (CBDC). The digital rupee was proposed in January 2017 and launched on 1 December 2022.

Like banknotes it will be uniquely identifiable and regulated by the central bank. Liability lies with RBI. Plans include online and offline accessibility. RBI launched the Digital Rupee for Wholesale (e₹-W) catering to financial institutions for interbank settlements and the Digital Rupee for Retail (e₹-R) for consumer and business transactions. The implementation of the digital rupee aims to remove the security printing cost borne by the general public, businesses, banks, and RBI on physical currency which amounted to ₹49,848,000,000. By 2026, the RBI's focus had shifted from transaction volumes to testing specific functionalities such as Offline digital currency via NFC and user-level programmability for government transfers.

== Legal framework ==
British East India Company (EIC) was given the right in 1717 to mint coins in the name of the Mughal emperor Farrukhsiyar on the island of Bombay. By 1792 the EIC demonetised all other coins till they were reduced to only 3 types of coins, i.e. EIC, Mughal and Maratha coins. After EIC expanded its control over India, it brought the "Coinage Act of 1835" and started to mint coins in the name of the British king. EIC rule was replaced by British Crown raj which brought the "Paper Currency Act of 1861" and the "Uniform Coinage Act of 1906".

After 2021, the government of independent India amended "The Coinage Act, 2011", the "Foreign Exchange Management Act (FEMA), 1999," the "Information Technology Act, 2000" and the "Crypto-currency and Regulation of Official Digital Currency Bill, 2021".

== Coins ==
=== Post-independence issues ===
==== Independent pre-decimal issues, 1950–1957 ====
India's first coins after independence were issued in 1950 in denominations of 1 pice, 1/2, one and two annas, 1/4, 1/2 and one-rupee. The sizes and composition were the same as the final regal issues, except for the one-piece (which was bronze, but not holed).

==== Independent decimal issues, 1957–present ====
In 1964, India introduced aluminium coins for denominations up to 20p.

The first decimal-coin issues in India consisted of 1, 2, 5, 10, 25 and 50 naye paise, and 1 rupee. The 1 naya paisa was bronze; the 2, 5, and 10 naye paise were cupro-nickel, and the 25 naye paise (nicknamed chawanni; 25 naye paise equals 4 annas), 50 naye paise (also called athanni; 50 naye paise equalled 8 old annas) and 1-rupee were nickel. In 1964, the words naya/naye were removed from all coins. Between 1957 and 1967, aluminium one-, two-, three-, five- and ten-paise coins were introduced. In 1968 nickel-brass 20-paise coins were introduced, and replaced by aluminium coins in 1982. Between 1972 and 1975, cupro-nickel replaced nickel in the 25- and 50-paise and the 1-rupee coins; in 1982, cupro-nickel two-rupee coins were introduced. In 1988 stainless steel 10-, 25- and 50-paise coins were introduced, followed by 1- and 5-rupee coins in 1992. Five-rupee coins, made from brass, are being minted by the Reserve Bank of India (RBI).

In 1997 the 20 paise coin was discontinued, followed by the 10 paise coin in 1998, and the 25 paise in 2002.

Between 2005 and 2008 new, lighter fifty-paise, one-, two-, and five-rupee coins were introduced, made from ferritic stainless steel. The move was prompted by the melting-down of older coins, whose face value was less than their scrap value. The demonetisation of the 25-paise coin and all paise coins below it took place, and a new series of coins (50 paise – nicknamed athanni – one, two, five, and ten rupees with the new rupee sign) were put into circulation in 2011.

The paisa currency was officially demonetized in 2011, thus as of 2026, coins of the denomination of 1 rupee are the lowest value in use.

Circulating coins
Image	Value	Technical parameters					Description		Year of	
Image	Value	Diameter	Mass	Composition	Colour	Shape	Obverse	Reverse	First minting	Last minting
Obverse of the Indian 50-paisa coin minted from 1988	50 paise	22 mm	3.79 g	Ferritic stainless steel	Silver	Circular	Value, Emblem of India	Map of India and Parliament House	1988	2007
Obverse of the Indian 50-paisa coin minted in 2008	50 paise	22 mm	3.79 g	Ferritic stainless steel	Silver	Circular	Emblem of India	Value, hand in a fist	2008	–
Obverse of the Indian 50-paisa coin minted in 2011	50 paise	19 mm	3.79 g	Ferritic stainless steel	Silver	Circular	Emblem of India	Value, the word "PAISE" in English and Hindi, floral motif and year of minting	2011	2016
Obverse of the Indian 1-rupee coin minted in 1992	₹1	25 mm	4.85 g	Ferritic stainless steel	Silver	Circular	Emblem of India, value	Value, two stalks of wheat	1992	2004
Obverse of the Indian 1-rupee coin minted in 2004	₹1	25 mm	4.95 g	Ferritic stainless steel	Silver	Circular	Unity from diversity, cross dividing 4 dots	Value, Emblem of India, Year of minting	2004	2007
Obverse of the Indian 1-rupee coin minted in 2007	₹1	25 mm	4.85 g	Ferritic stainless steel	Silver	Circular	Emblem of India	Value, hand showing thumb (an expression in the Bharata Natyam Dance)	2007	2011
Obverse of the Indian 1-rupee coin minted in 2011	₹1	22 mm	3.79 g	Ferritic stainless steel	Silver	Circular	Emblem of India	Value, new rupee sign, floral motif and year of minting	2011	2018
Reverse of the Indian 1-rupee coin minted since 2019	₹1	20 mm	3.09 g	Stainless steel	Silver	Circular	Emblem of India	Value, rupee sign, year of issue, grains depicting the agricultural dominance of the country	2019	–
Obverse of the Indian 2-rupees coin minted in 1982	₹2	26 mm	6 g	Cupro-Nickel	Silver	Eleven-sided	National integration	Emblem of India, Value	1982	2004
Obverse of the Indian 2-rupees coin minted in 2005	₹2	26.75 mm	5.8 g	Ferritic stainless steel	Silver	Circular	Unity from diversity, cross dividing 4 dots	Value, Emblem of India, Year of minting	2005	2007
Obverse of the Indian 2-rupees coin minted in 2007	₹2	27 mm	5.62 g	Ferritic stainless steel	Silver	Circular	Emblem of India, year of minting	Value, hand showing two fingers (Hasta Mudra – hand gesture from the dance Bharata Natyam)	2007	2011
Obverse of the Indian 2-rupees coin minted in 2011	₹2	25 mm	4.85 g	Ferritic stainless steel	Silver	Circular	Emblem of India	Value, new rupee sign, floral motif and year of minting	2011	2018
Obverse of the Indian 2-rupees coin minted in 2019	₹2	23 mm	4.07 g	Ferritic stainless steel	Silver	Circular	Emblem of India	Value, rupee sign, year of issue, grains depicting the agricultural dominance of the country	2019	–
Obverse of the Indian 5-rupees coin minted in 1992	₹5	23 mm	9 g	Cupro-Nickel	Silver	Circular	Emblem of India	Value	1992	2006
Obverse of the Indian 5-rupee coin minted in 2007	₹5	23 mm	6 g	Ferritic stainless steel	Silver	Circular	Emblem of India	Value, wavy lines	2007	2009
Obverse of the Indian 5-rupees coin minted in 2009	₹5	23 mm	6 g	Nickel-brass	Gold	Circular	Emblem of India	Value, new rupee sign, floral motif and year of minting	2009	2011
Obverse of the Indian 5-rupees coin minted in 2011	₹5	23 mm	6 g	Nickel-Brass	Gold	Circular	Emblem of India	Value, new rupee sign, floral motif and year of minting	2011	2018
Obverse of the Indian 5-rupees coin minted in 2019	₹5	25 mm	6.74 g	Nickel-Brass	Gold	Circular	Emblem of India	Value, rupee sign, year of issue, grains depicting the agricultural dominance of the country	2019	–
Reverse of the Indian 10-rupees coin minted in 2008	₹10	27 mm	7.62 g	Bimetallic	Silver and gold	Circular	Emblem of India and year of minting	Value with outward radiating pattern of 15 spokes	2006	2010
Obverse of the Indian 10-rupees coin minted in 2011	₹10	27 mm	7.62 g	Bimetallic	Silver and gold	Circular	Emblem of India and year of minting	Value with an outward radiating pattern of 10 spokes, new rupee sign	2011	2018
Obverse of the Indian 10-rupees coin minted in 2019	₹10	27 mm	7.74 g	Bimetallic	Silver and gold	Circular	Emblem of India	Value, rupee sign, year of issue, grains depicting the agricultural dominance of the country	2019	–
Obverse of the Indian 20-rupees coin minted in 2019	₹20	27 mm	8.54 g	Bimetallic	Gold and silver	Dodecagonal	Emblem of India	Value, rupee sign, year of issue, grains depicting the agricultural dominance of the country	2019	–

The coins are minted at the four locations of the India Government Mint. The ₹1, ₹2, and ₹5 coins have been minted since independence. The Government of India is set to introduce a new ₹20 coin with a dodecagonal shape, and like the ₹10 coin, also bi-metallic, along with new designs for the new versions of the ₹1, ₹2, ₹5 and ₹10 coins, which were announced on 6 March 2019.

==== Minting ====
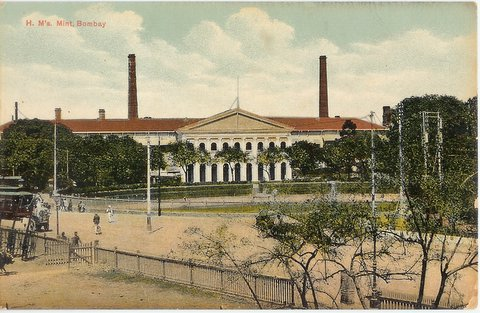
A postcard depicting the Bombay Mint.

The Government of India has the only right to mint the coins and one rupee note. The responsibility for coinage comes under the Coinage Act, 1906 which is amended from time to time. The designing and minting of coins in various denominations is also the responsibility of the Government of India. Coins are minted at the four India Government Mints at Mumbai, Kolkata, Hyderabad, and Noida. The coins are issued for circulation only through the Reserve Bank in terms of the RBI Act.

==== Commemorative coins ====
After independence, the Government of India Mint, minted numismatic coins imprinted with Indian statesmen, historical and religious figures. In the years 2010 and 2011, for the first time ever, ₹75, ₹150 and ₹1000 coins were minted in India to commemorate the Platinum Jubilee of the Reserve Bank of India, the 150th birth anniversary of the birth of Rabindranath Tagore and 1000 years of the Brihadeeswarar Temple, respectively. In 2012, a ₹60 piececoins was also issued to commemorate 60 years of the Government of India Mint, Kolkata. ₹100 coin was also released commemorating the 100th anniversary of Mahatma Gandhi's return to India. Commemorative coins of ₹125 were released on 4 September 2015 and 6 December 2015 to honour the 125th anniversary of the births of Sarvepalli Radhakrishnan and B. R. Ambedkar, respectively.

=== Pre-independence issues ===
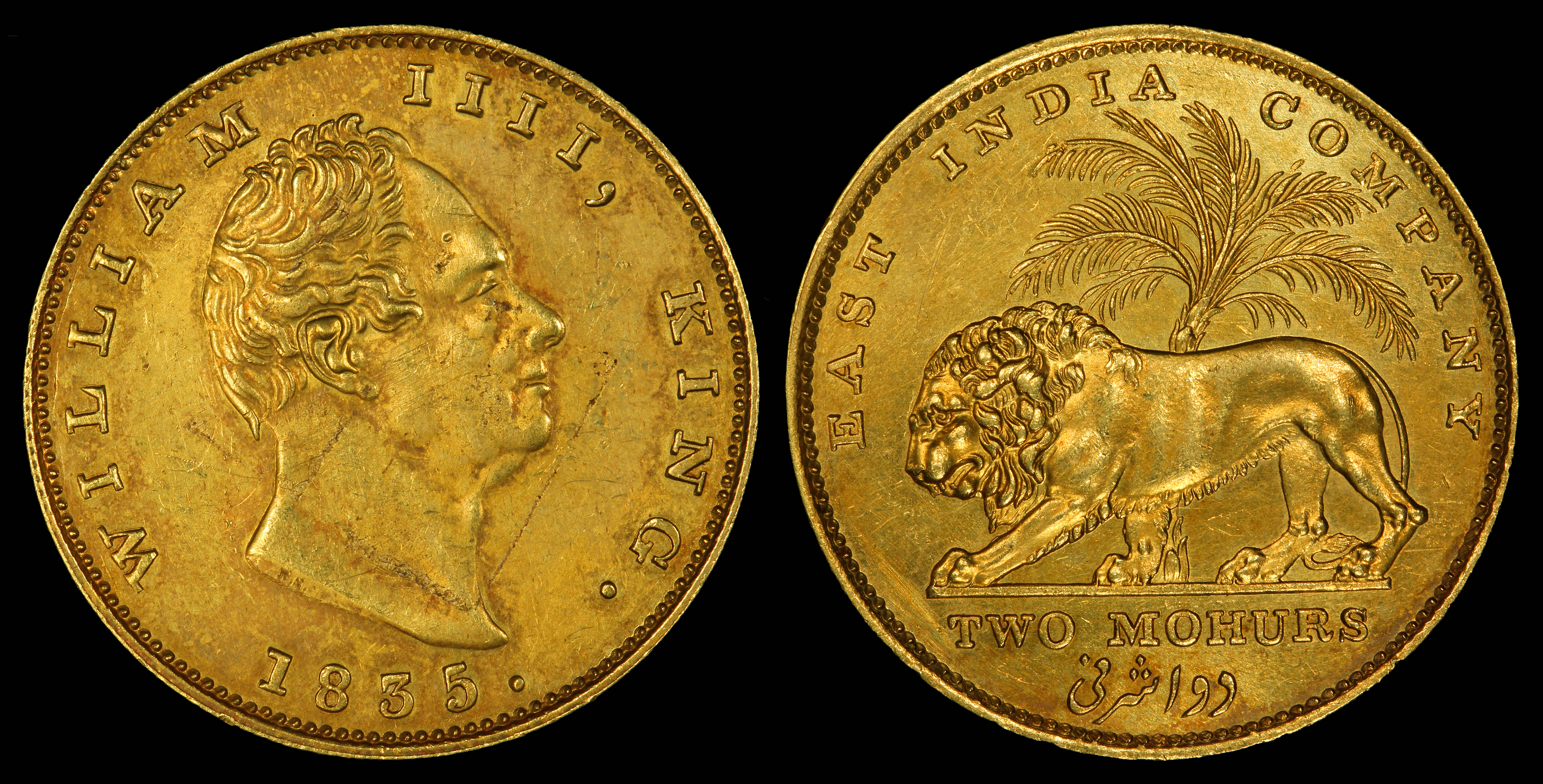
1835 East India Company 2 Mohurs

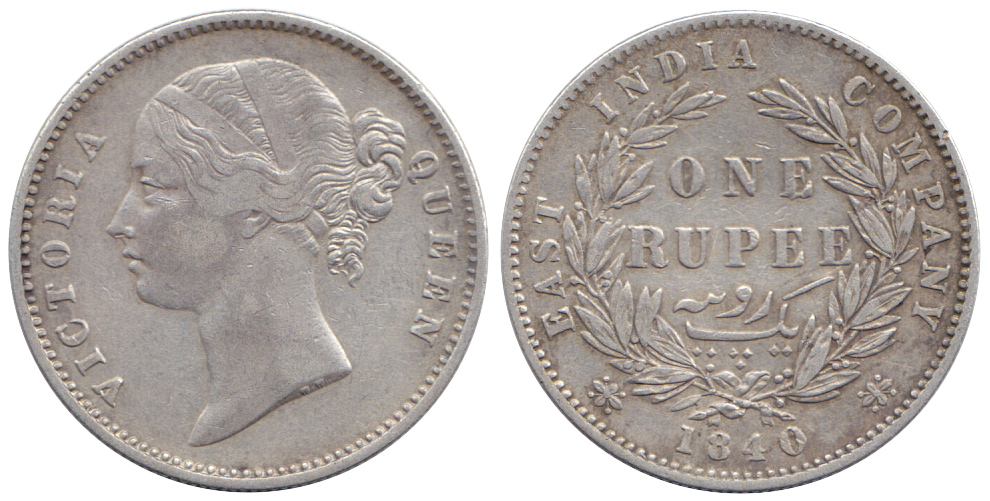
1840 East India Company rupee. It was minted in Bombay, Calcutta and Madras

Indian rupee (from 1862)

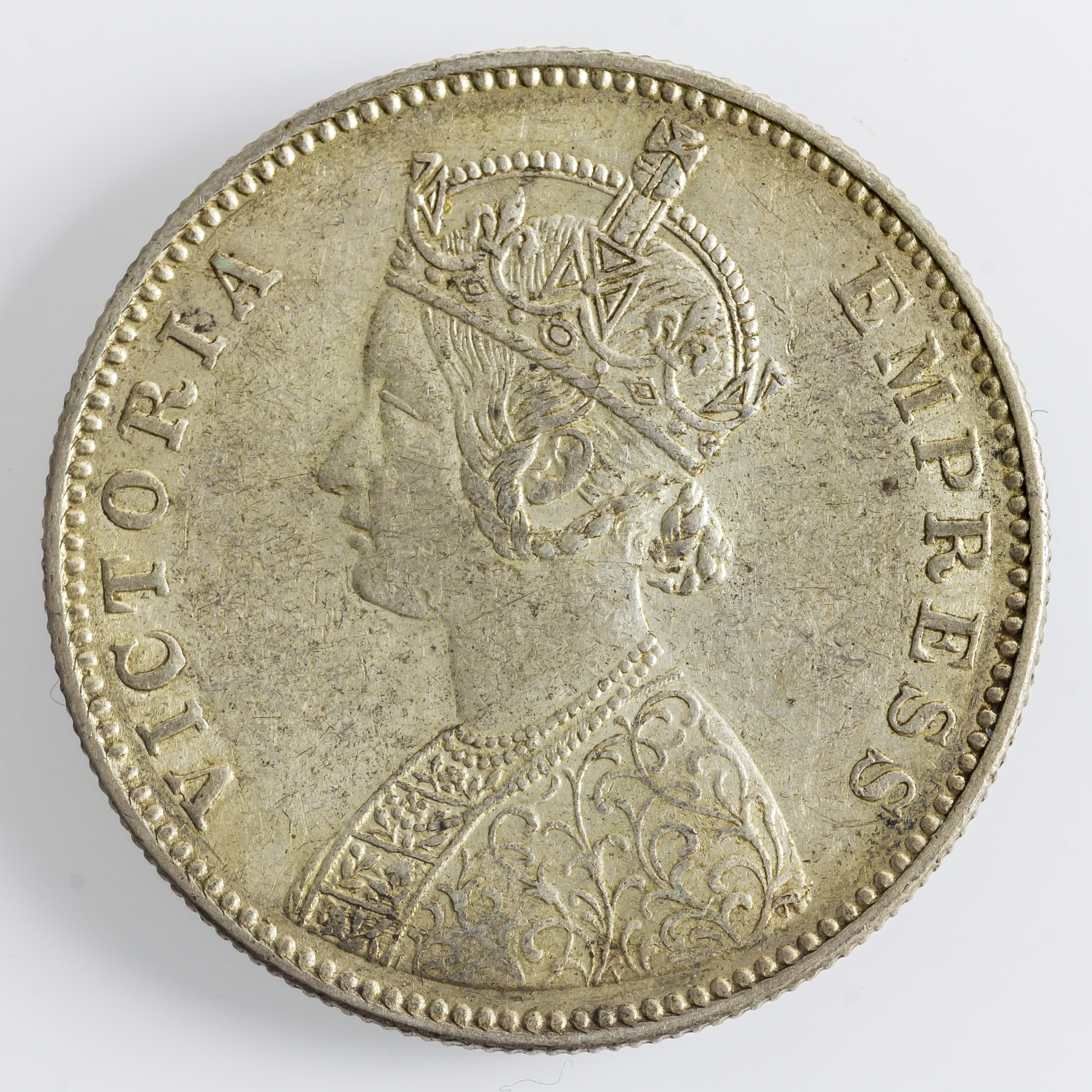
Obverse: Crowned bust of Queen Victoria

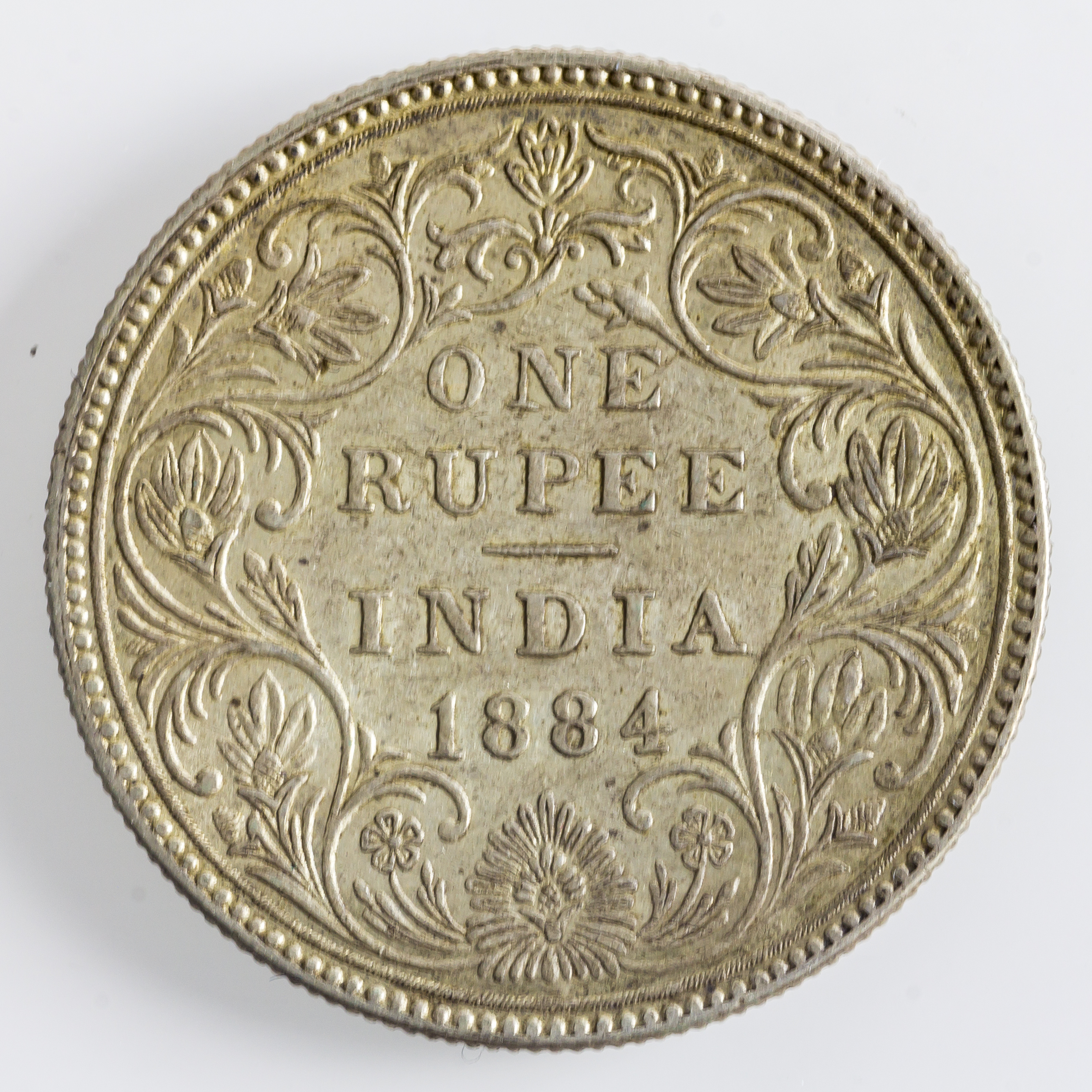
Reverse: Face value, country and year of issue

Coin made of 91.7% silver

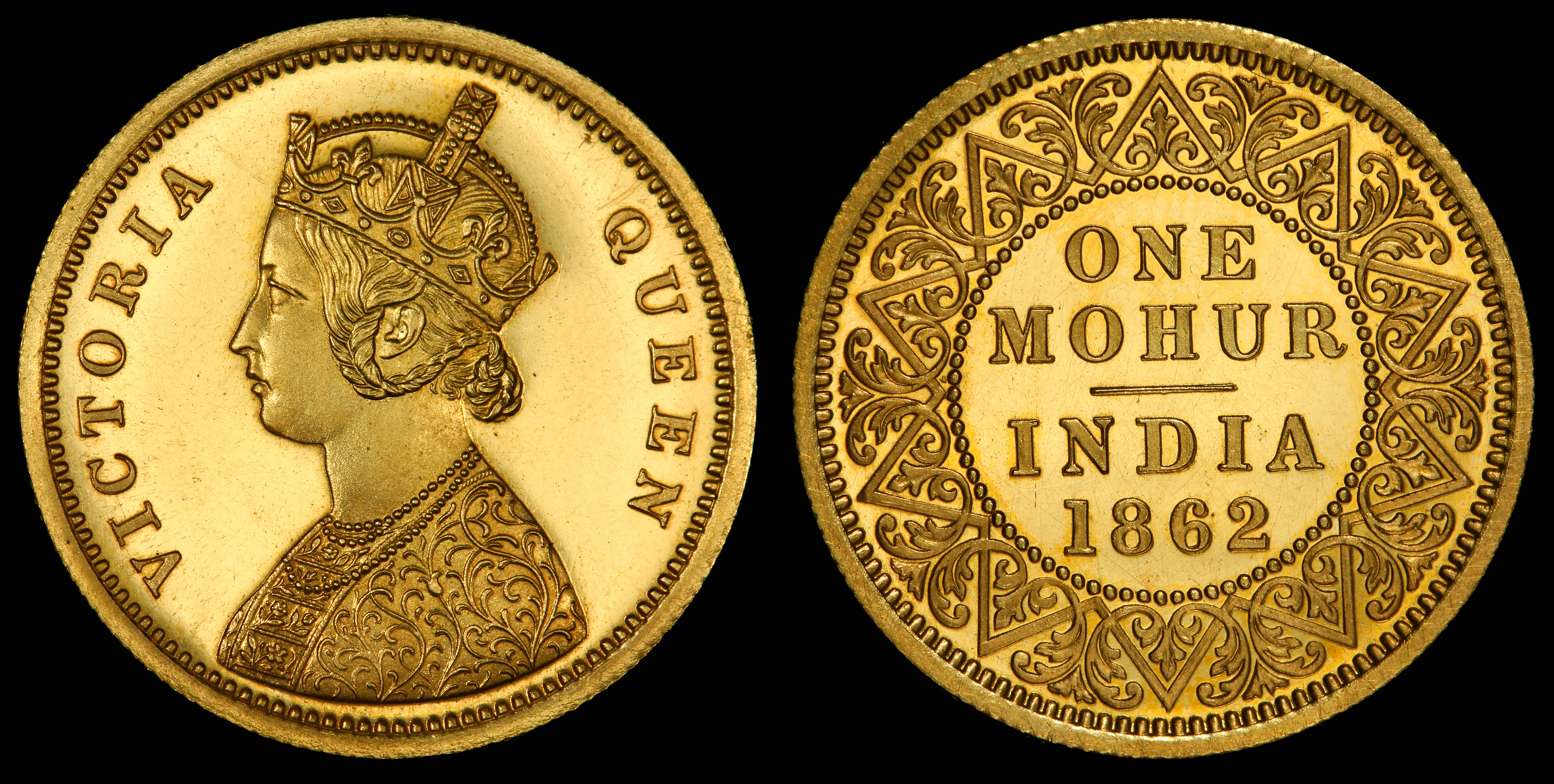
1862 Indian One Mohur

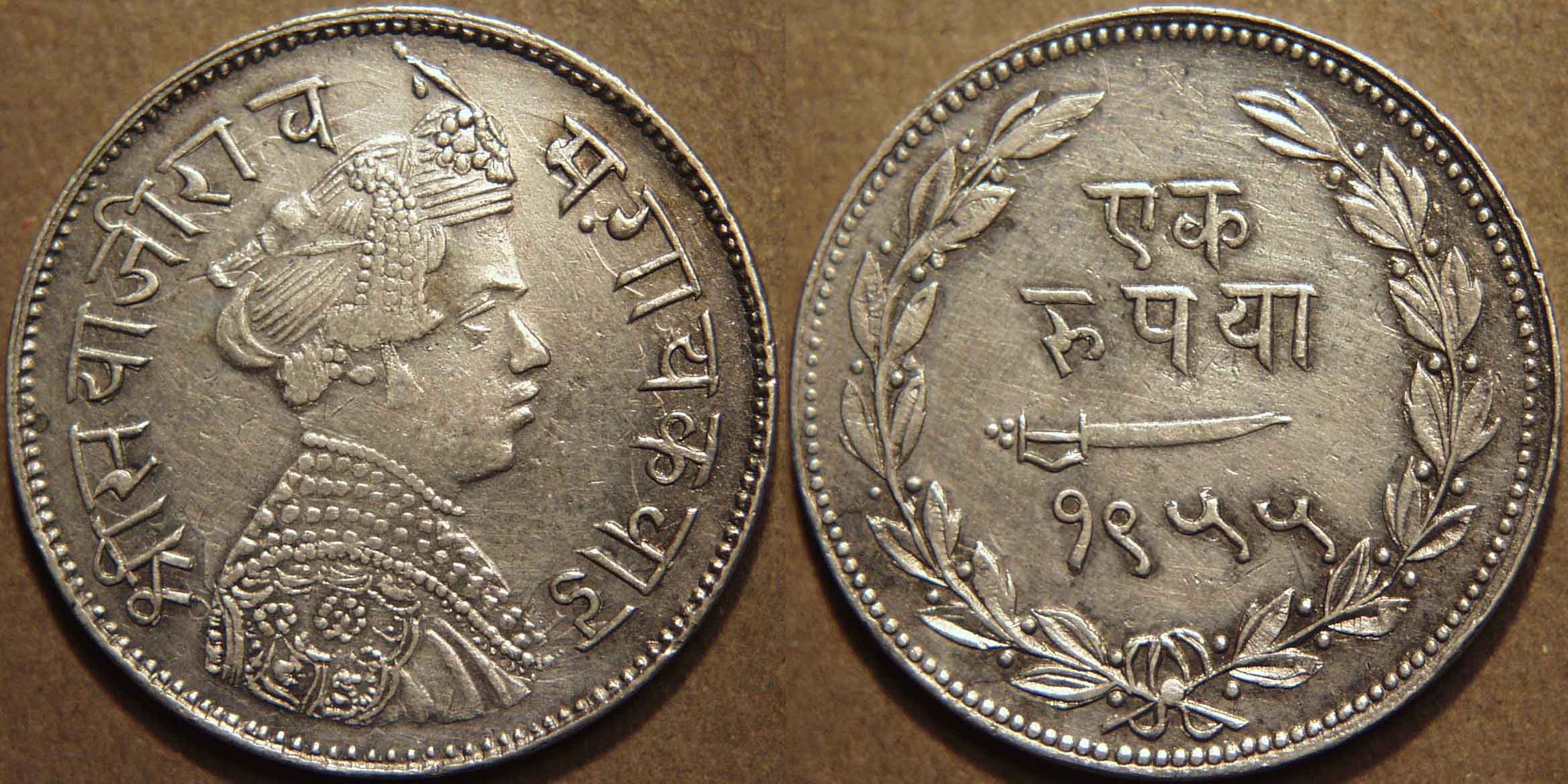
Silver rupee of Sayajirao Gaekwad III of Baroda State (ruled 1875–1939), showing his profile. This coin is dated 1955 in the Vikrami calendar (1897 CE)

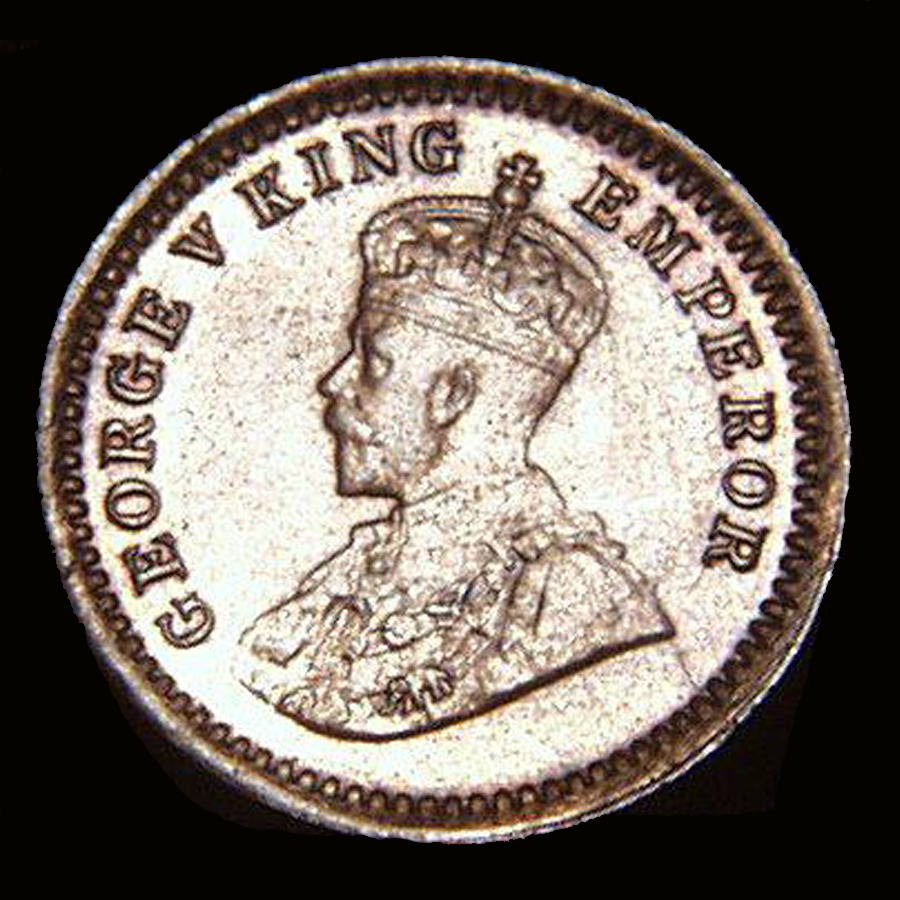
Regal issue minted during the reign of King/Emperor George V

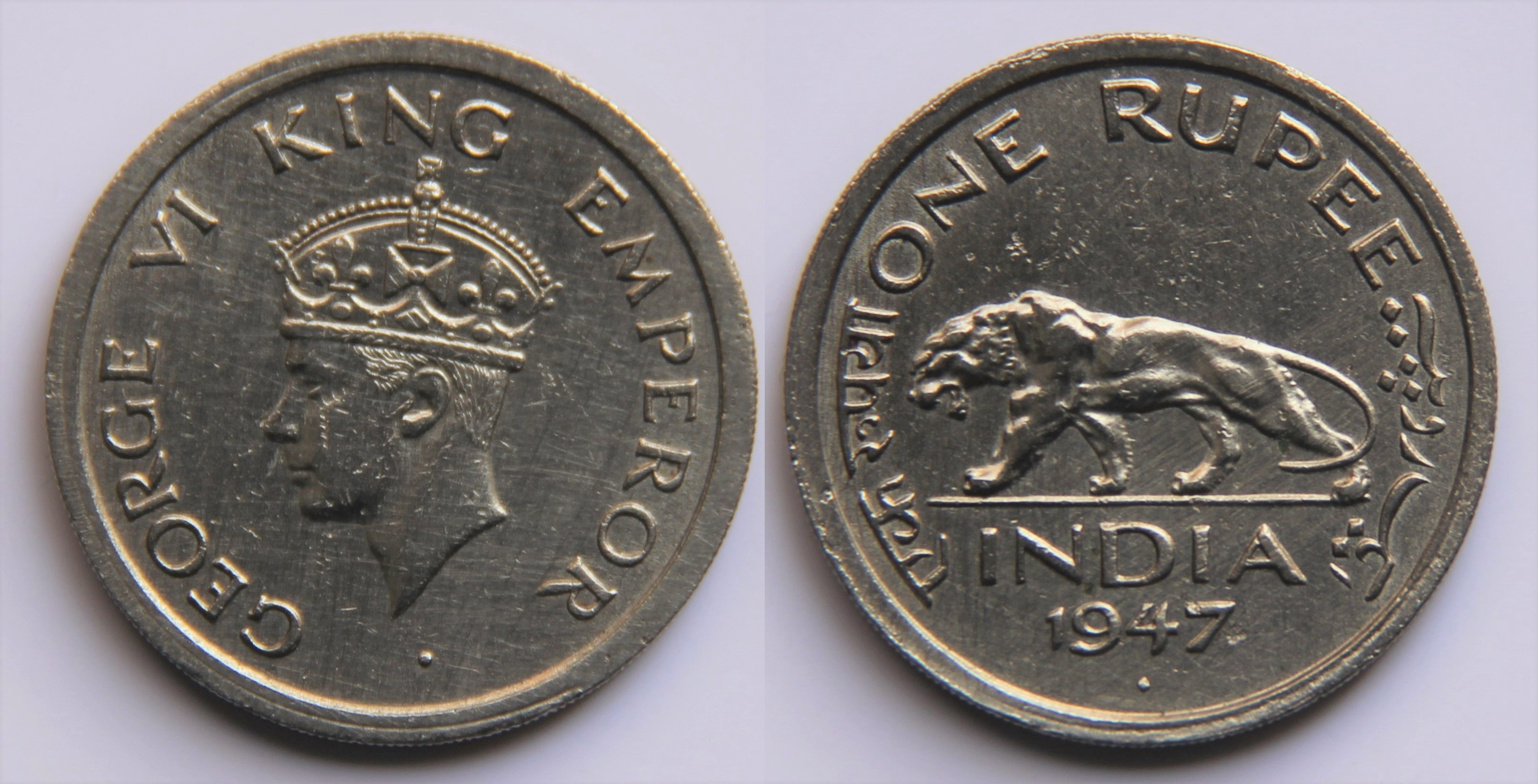
1 Indian rupee (1947) featuring George VI on obverse and Indian Lion on reverse

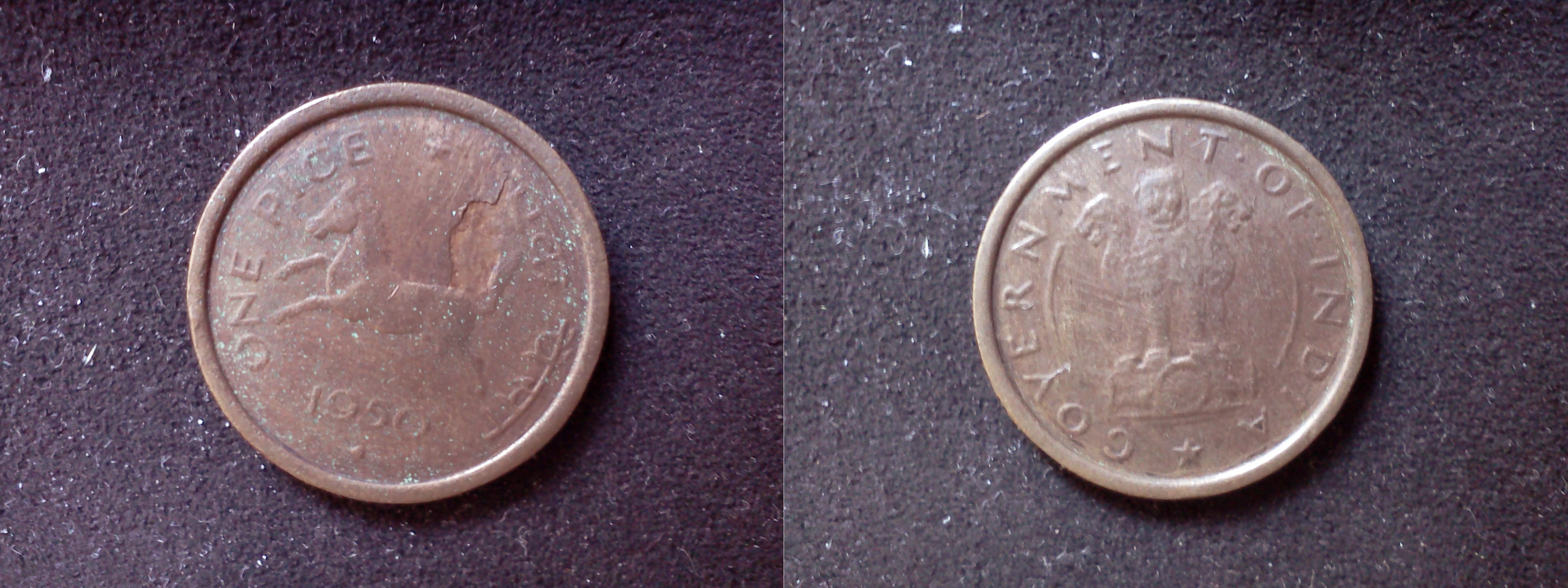
Indian one pice, minted in 1950

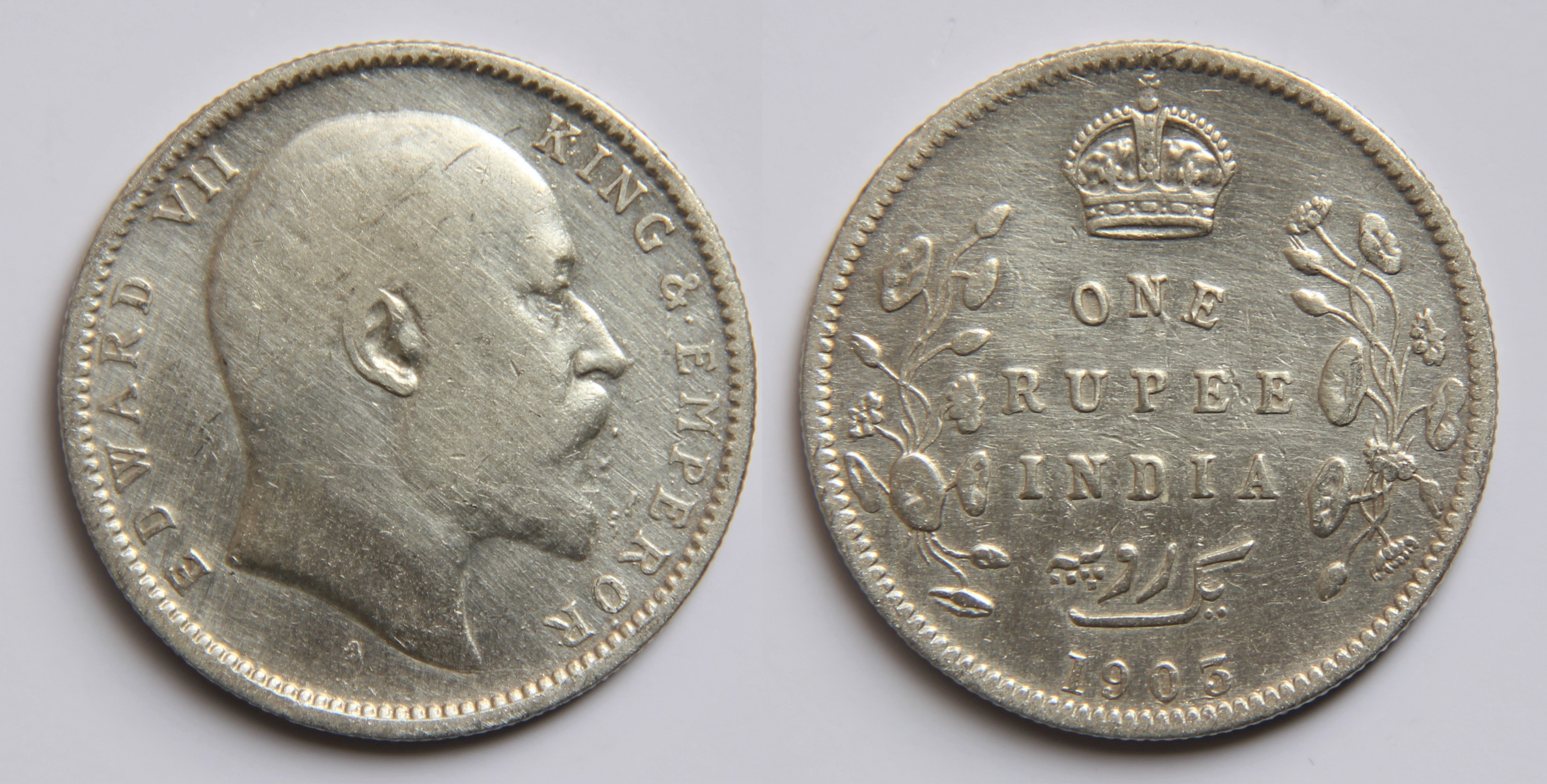
1 Indian rupee (1905) featuring Edward VII

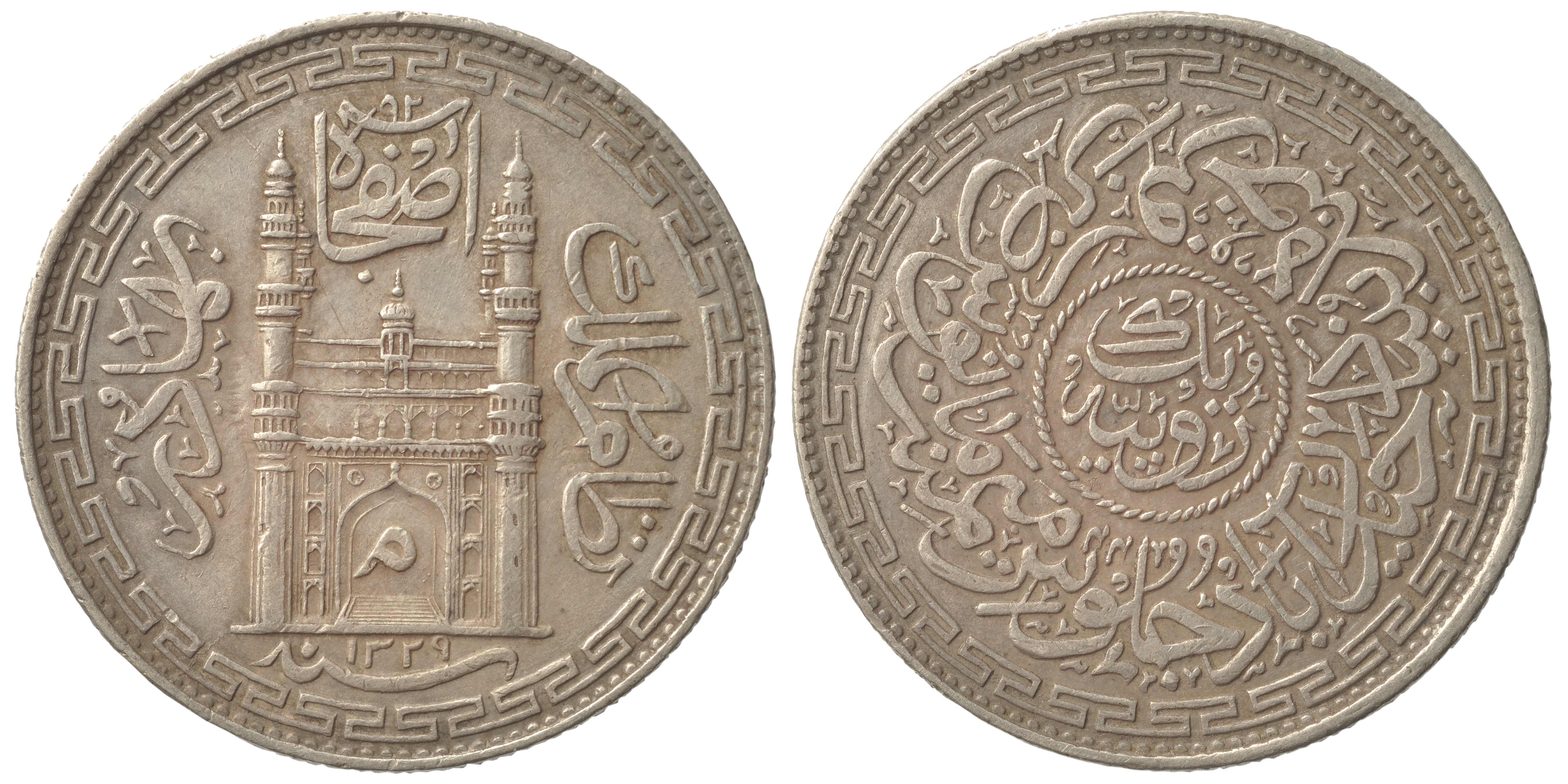
One-rupee coin issued by Mir Mahbub Ali Khan of Hyderabad State, 1329 AH (1911)

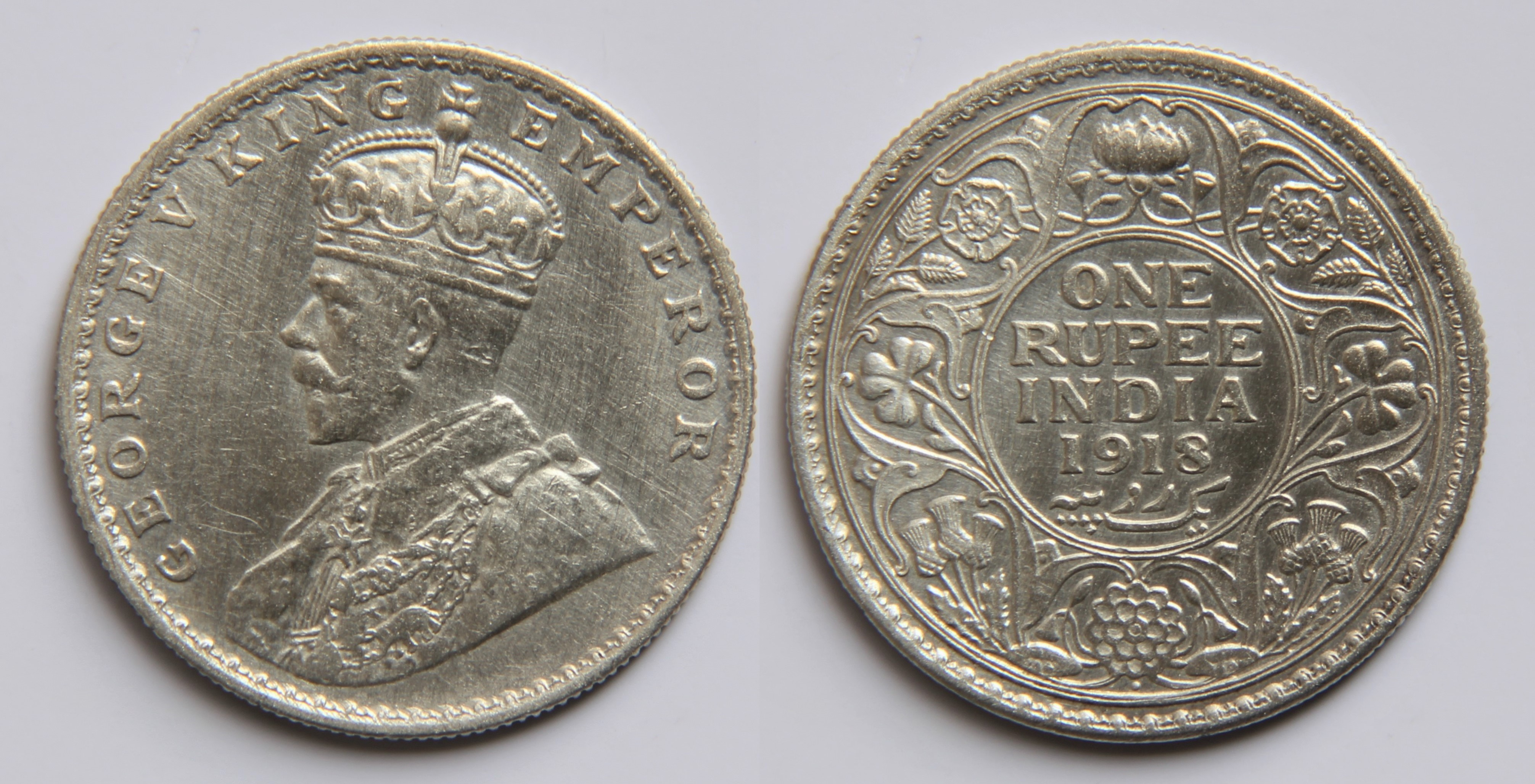
1 Indian rupee (1918) featuring George V

==== East India Company, 1835 ====
The three Presidencies established by the British East India Company (Bengal, Bombay and Madras) each issued their own coinages until 1835. All three issued rupees and fractions thereof down to 1/8- and 1/16-rupee in silver. Madras also issued two-rupee coins.

Copper denominations were more varied. Bengal issued one-pie, 1/2-, one- and two-paise coins. Bombay issued 1-pie, 1/4-, 1/2-, 1-, 1 1/2-, 2- and 4-paise coins. In Madras, there were copper coins for two and four pies and one, two and four paise, with the first two denominated as 1/2 and one dub (or 1/96 and 1/48) rupee. Madras also issued the Madras fanam until 1815.

All three Presidencies issued gold mohurs and fractions of mohurs including 1/16, 1/2, 1/4 in Bengal, 1/15 (a gold rupee) and 1/3 (pancia) in Bombay and 1/4, 1/3 and 1/2 in Madras.

In 1835, a single coinage for the EIC was introduced. It consisted of copper 1/12, 1/4 and 1/2 anna, silver 1/4, 1/3 and 1 rupee and gold 1 and 2 mohurs. In 1841, silver 2 annas were added, followed by copper 1/2 pice in 1853. The coinage of the EIC continued to be issued until 1862, even after the company had been taken over by the Crown.

==== Regal issues, 1862–1947 ====
In 1862, coins were introduced (known as "regal issues") which bore the profile of Queen Victoria and the designation "India". Their denominations were 1/12 anna, 1/2 pice, 1/4 and 1/2 anna (all in copper), 2 annas, 1/4, 1/2 and one rupee (silver), and five and ten rupees and one mohur (gold). The gold denominations ceased production in 1891, and no 1/2-anna coins were issued after 1877.

In 1906, bronze replaced copper for the lowest three denominations; in 1907, a cupro-nickel one-anna coin was introduced. In 1918–1919 cupro-nickel two-, four- and eight-annas were introduced, although the four- and eight-annas coins were only issued until 1921 and did not replace their silver equivalents. In 1918, the Bombay mint also struck gold sovereigns and 15-rupee coins identical in size to the sovereigns as an emergency measure during the First World War.

In the early 1940s, several changes were implemented. The 1/12 anna and 1/2 pice ceased production, the 1/4 anna was changed to a bronze, holed coin, cupro-nickel and nickel-brass 1/2-anna coins were introduced, nickel-brass was used to produce one- and two-annas coins, and the silver composition was reduced from 91.7 to 50 per cent. The last of the regal issues were cupro-nickel 1/4-, 1/2- and one-rupee pieces minted in 1946 and 1947, bearing the image of George VI, King and Emperor on the obverse and an Indian lion on the reverse.

== Banknotes ==
=== Post-independence issues ===
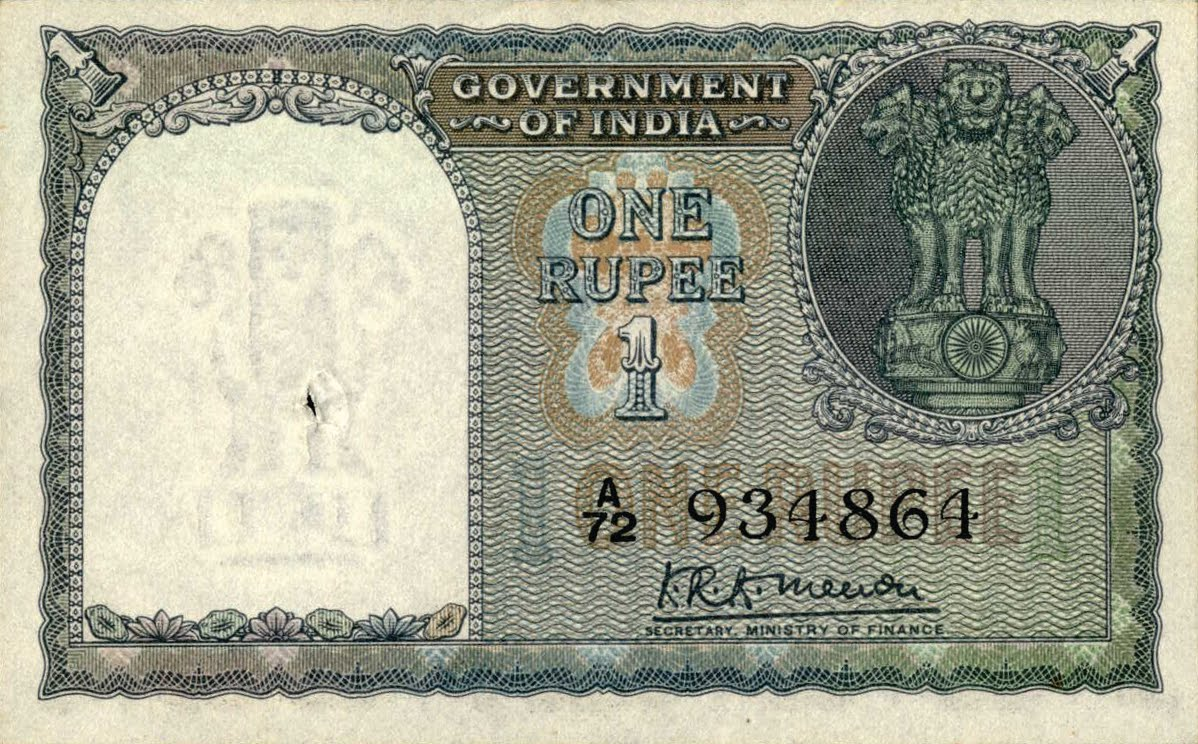
First banknote of independent India, one rupee (1949)

After independence, new designs were introduced to replace the portrait of George VI. The government continued issuing the ₹1 note, while the Reserve Bank of India (RBI) issued other denominations (including the ₹5,000 and ₹10,000 notes introduced in 1949). All pre-independence banknotes were officially demonetised with effect from 28 April 1957.

During the 1970s, ₹20 and ₹50 notes were introduced; denominations higher than ₹100 were demonetised in 1978. In 1987, the ₹500 note was introduced, followed by the ₹1,000 note in 2000 while ₹1 and ₹2 notes were discontinued in 1995.

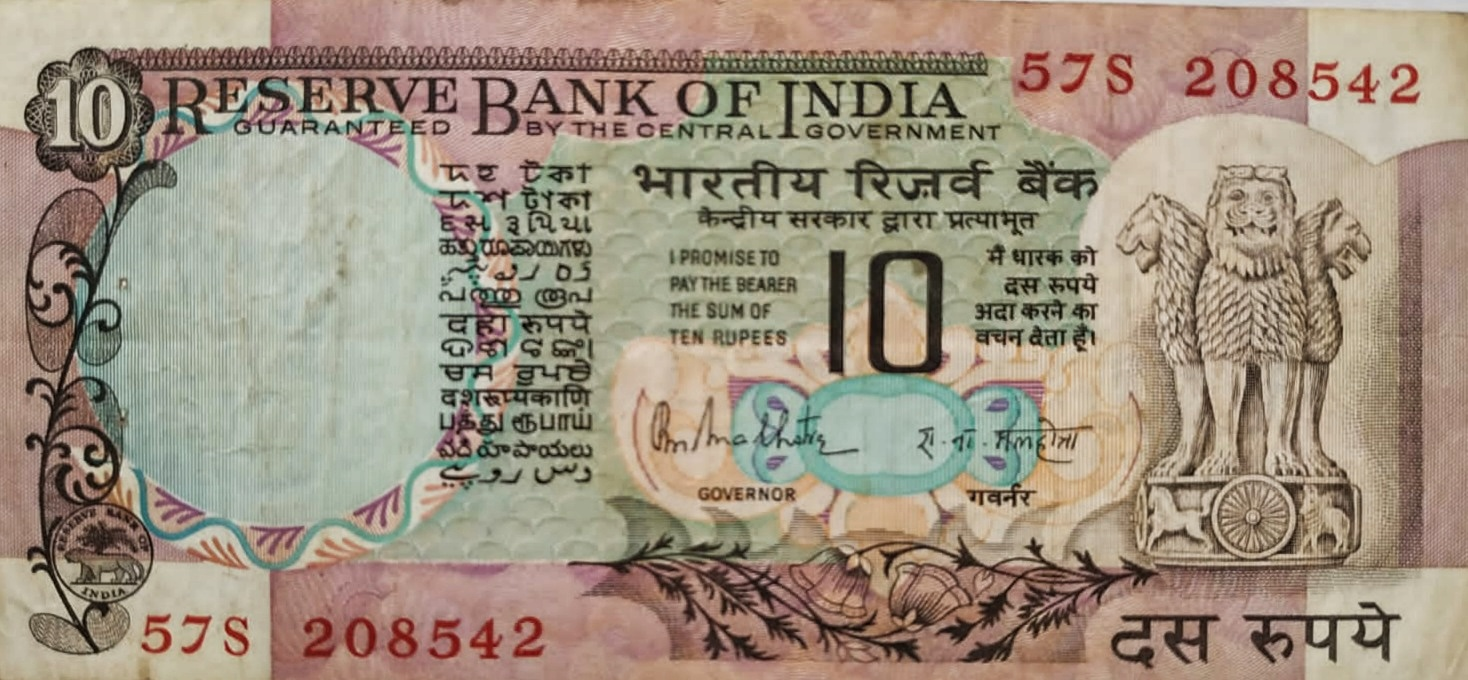
10-rupee banknote from the 1990s

The design of banknotes is approved by the central government, on the recommendation of the central board of the Reserve Bank of India. Currency notes are printed at the Currency Note Press in Nashik, the Bank Note Press in Dewas, the Bharatiya Reserve Bank Note Mudran (P) Ltd at Salboni and Mysore and at the Watermark Paper Manufacturing Mill in Narmadapuram. The Mahatma Gandhi Series of banknotes are issued by the Reserve Bank of India as legal tender. The series is so named because the obverse of each note features a portrait of Mahatma Gandhi. Since its introduction in 1996, this series has replaced all issued banknotes of the Lion Capital Series. The RBI introduced the series in 1996 with ₹10 and ₹500 banknotes. The printing of ₹5 notes (which had stopped earlier) resumed in 2009.

On 23 September 2011, the '₹' sign first appeared with the coming of the new ₹10 note, and as of December 2011, it has been incorporated into banknotes of the Mahatma Gandhi Series in denominations of ₹10, ₹20, ₹50, ₹100, ₹500 and ₹1,000. In January 2014 RBI announced that it would be withdrawing from circulation all currency notes printed prior to 2005 by 31 March 2014. The deadline was later extended to 1 January 2015. The deadline was further extended to 30 June 2016.

On 8 November 2016, the RBI announced the issuance of new ₹500 banknotes in a new series after demonetisation of the older ₹500 and ₹1000 notes. The new ₹500 banknote has a stone-grey base colour with an image of the Red Fort along with the Indian flag printed on the back. Both the banknotes also have the Swachh Bharat Abhiyan logo printed on the back. The banknote denominations of ₹200, ₹100 and ₹50 have also been introduced in the new Mahatma Gandhi New Series intended to replace all banknotes of the previous Mahatma Gandhi Series. On 13 June 2017, RBI introduced new ₹50 notes, but the old ones continue being legal tender. The design is similar to the current notes in the Mahatma Gandhi (New) Series, except they will come with an inset 'A'.

On 8 November 2016, the Government of India announced the demonetisation of ₹500 and ₹1,000 banknotes with effect from midnight of the same day, making these notes invalid. A newly redesigned series of ₹500 banknote, in addition to a new denomination of ₹2,000 banknote is in circulation since 10 November 2016.

From 2017 to 2019, the remaining banknotes of the Mahatma Gandhi New Series were released in denominations of ₹10, ₹20, ₹50, ₹100 and ₹200. The ₹1,000 note has been suspended.

==== Current circulating banknotes ====
As of 27 April 2025, current circulating banknotes are in denominations of ₹1, ₹5, ₹10, ₹20, ₹50 and ₹100 from the Mahatma Gandhi Series (retired) and in denominations of ₹10, ₹20, ₹50, ₹100, ₹200, ₹500 and ₹2000 (recalled but still legal tender) from the Mahatma Gandhi New Series.

Limited-circulation banknotes
Image		Value	Dimensions	Main colour	Description			Date of issue	Circulation
Obverse	Reverse	Value	Dimensions	Main colour	Obverse	Reverse	Watermark	Date of issue	Circulation
		₹1	97 × 63 mm	Pink	New ₹1 coin	Sagar Samrat oil rig	National Emblem of India	2015	Limited
		₹5	117 × 63 mm	Green	Mahatma Gandhi	Tractor	Mahatma Gandhi and electrotype denomination	2002 / 2009	Limited

Mahatma Gandhi New Series
Image		Value	Year	Dimensions (millimetres)	Main colour	Portrait	Reverse design	Signature / feature
Obverse	Reverse	Value	Year	Dimensions (millimetres)	Main colour	Portrait	Reverse design	Signature / feature
		₹10	2017	123 × 63 mm	Chocolate Brown	Mahatma Gandhi	Konark Sun Temple	Mahatma Gandhi and electrotype denomination
		₹20	2019	129 × 63 mm	Greenish Yellow	Mahatma Gandhi	Ellora Caves	Mahatma Gandhi and electrotype denomination
		₹50	2017	135 × 66 mm	Fluorescent Blue	Mahatma Gandhi	Hampi	Mahatma Gandhi and electrotype denomination
		₹100	2018	142 × 66 mm	Lavender	Mahatma Gandhi	Rani ki vav	Mahatma Gandhi and electrotype denomination
		₹200	2017	146 × 66 mm	Orange	Mahatma Gandhi	Sanchi Stupa	Mahatma Gandhi and electrotype denomination
		₹500	2016	150 × 66 mm	Stone Grey	Mahatma Gandhi	Red Fort	Mahatma Gandhi and electrotype denomination
		₹2000	2016	166 × 66 mm	Magenta	Mahatma Gandhi	Mangalyaan	Mahatma Gandhi and electrotype denomination
These images are to scale at 0.7 pixel per millimetre (18 pixel per inch). For table standards, see the banknote specification table.

===== Micro printing =====
The new Indian banknote series features a few micro-printed texts in various locations. The first one lies on the inner surface of the left temple of Gandhi's spectacles that reads "भारत" (Bhārata), the Hindi word for India. The next one (which is printed only in 10 and 50 denominations) is placed on the outer surface of the right temple of Gandhi's spectacles near his ear and reads "RBI" (Reserve Bank of India) and the face value in numerals "10" or "50". The last one is written on both sides of Gandhi's collar and reads "भारत" and "INDIA" respectively. Currency notes have 17 languages on the panel which appears on the reverse of the notes.

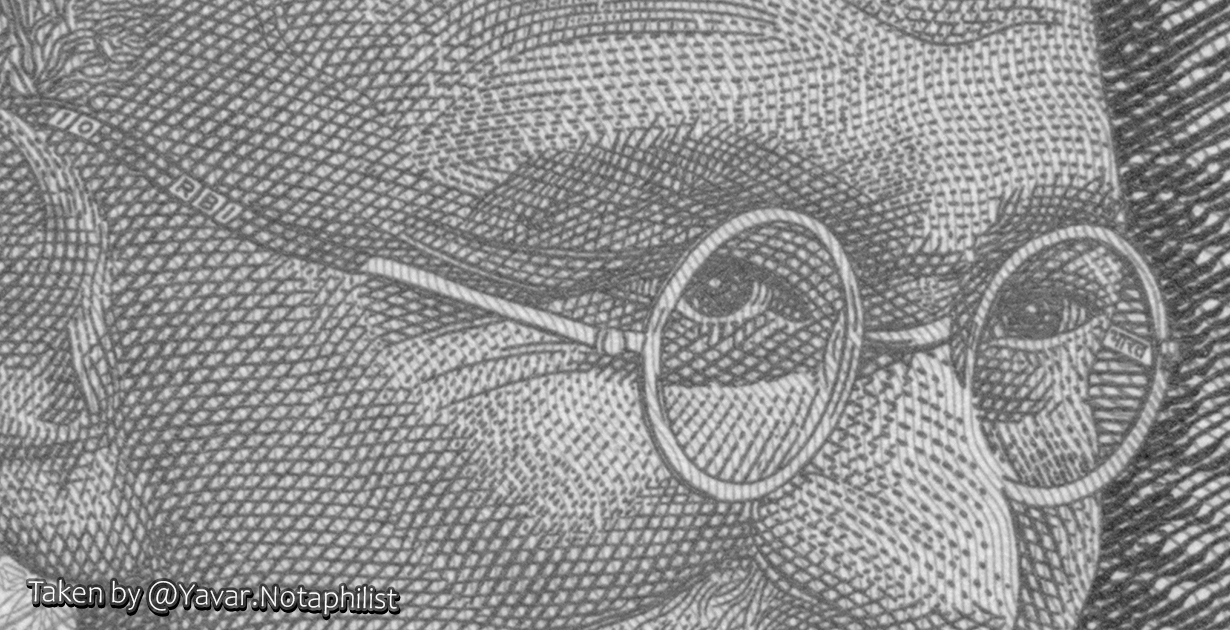
Micro printed texts on Gandhi's spectacles

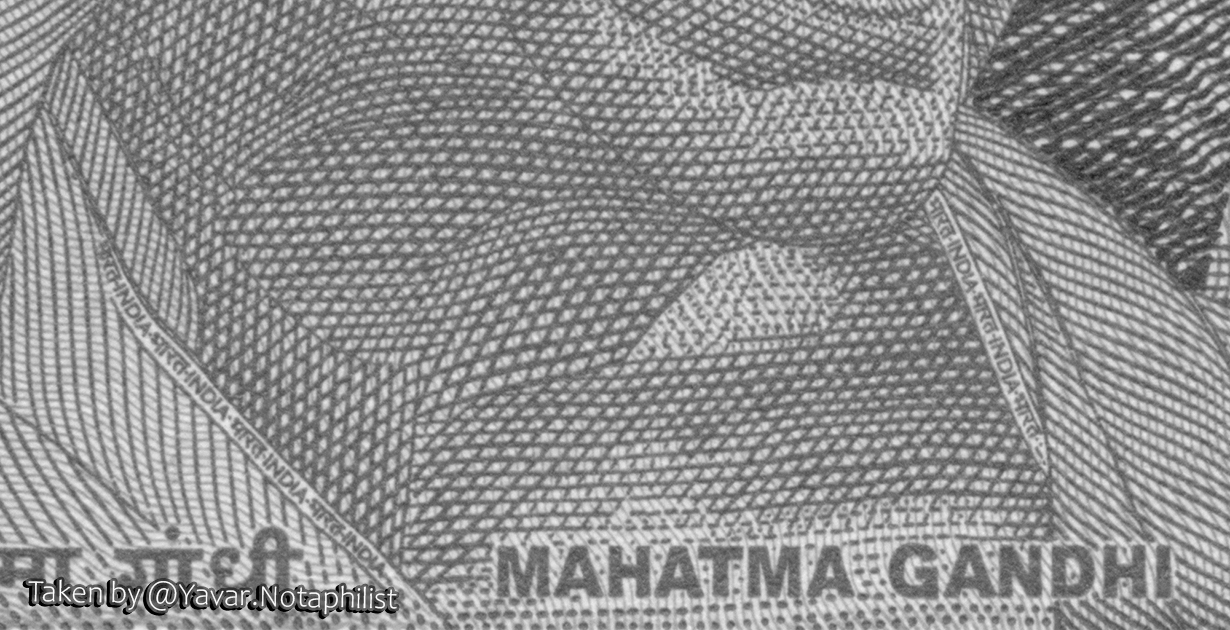
Micro printed texts on Gandhi's collar

=== Pre-independence issues ===
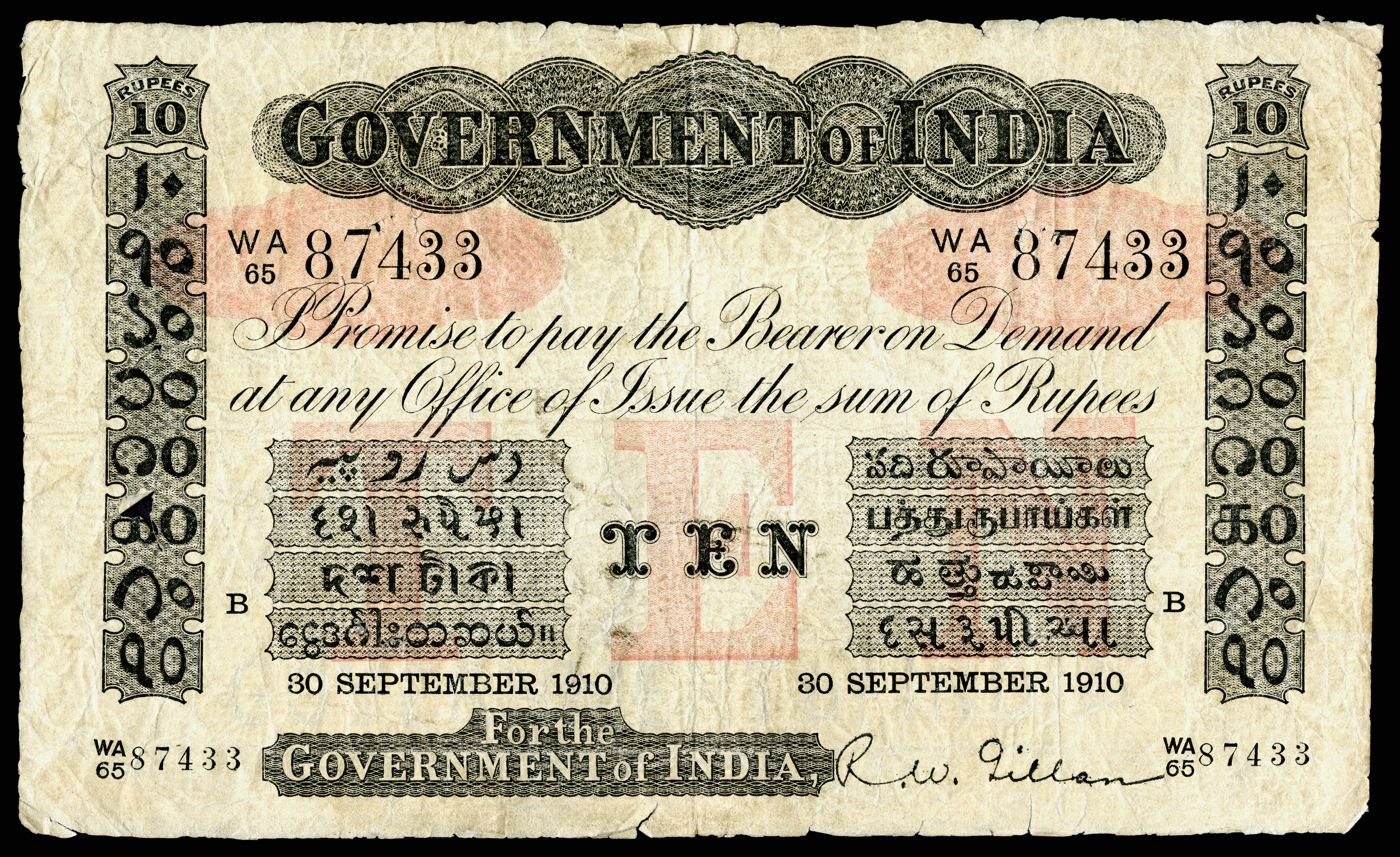
Government of India – 10 rupees (1910), Red Underprint Series

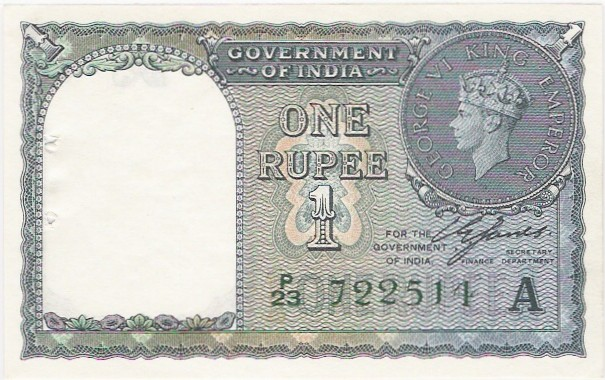
British Indian one rupee note, Reserve Bank of India 1940 issue

In 1861, the Government of India introduced its first paper money through the Paper Currency Act. The ₹10 note was introduced in 1864, ₹5 note in 1872, ₹10,000 note in 1899, ₹100 note in 1900, ₹50 note in 1905, ₹500 note in 1907 and ₹1,000 note in 1909. The first set of notes, known as the "Victoria Portrait" Series, were unifaced and featured two language panels on hand-moulded paper. This series' name is derived from the portrait of Queen Victoria which appeared in the upper-left corner of the notes. In 1917, ₹1 and ₹2 1/2 notes were introduced.

In 1867, the Victoria Portrait series was withdrawn and replaced with the unifaced "Underprint Series" in response to forgery. Underprint Series notes featured 4 language panels in the "Green Series" (notes which featured a green underprint). The languages on the notes differed in relation to where the note was issued. The amount of language panels was increased to 8 in the "Red Series" (notes which featured a red underprint). The Underprint Series remained largely unchanged until the introduction of the "King's Portrait" Series in 1923.

The King's Portrait Series were introduced in May 1923 on a ten rupee note.

After the accession of King George V lower denominations such as ₹1 and ₹2.5 were printed along with notes for specific territories like Burma.

The Reserve Bank of India began banknote production in 1938, issuing ₹2, ₹5, ₹10, ₹50, ₹100, ₹1,000 and ₹10,000 notes while the government continued issuing ₹1 note but demonetized the ₹500 and ₹2 1/2 notes.

== Convertibility ==
Most traded currencies by value Currency distribution of global foreign exchange market turnover
Currency	ISO 4217 code	Proportion of daily volume		Change (2022–2025)
Currency	ISO 4217 code	April 2022	April 2025	Change (2022–2025)
United States dollar	USD	88.4%	89.2%	▲0.8pp
Euro	EUR	30.6%	28.9%	▼1.7pp
Japanese yen	JPY	16.7%	16.8%	▲0.1pp
Pound sterling	GBP	12.9%	10.2%	▼2.7pp
Renminbi	CNY	7.0%	8.5%	▲1.5pp
Swiss franc	CHF	5.2%	6.4%	▲1.2pp
Australian dollar	AUD	6.4%	6.1%	▼0.3pp
Canadian dollar	CAD	6.2%	5.8%	▼0.4pp
Hong Kong dollar	HKD	2.6%	3.8%	▲1.2pp
Singapore dollar	SGD	2.4%	2.4%	Steady
Indian rupee	INR	1.6%	1.9%	▲0.3pp
South Korean won	KRW	1.8%	1.8%	Steady
Swedish krona	SEK	2.2%	1.6%	▼0.6pp
Mexican peso	MXN	1.5%	1.6%	▲0.1pp
New Zealand dollar	NZD	1.7%	1.5%	▼0.2pp
Norwegian krone	NOK	1.7%	1.3%	▼0.4pp
New Taiwan dollar	TWD	1.1%	1.2%	▲0.1pp
Brazilian real	BRL	0.9%	0.9%	Steady
South African rand	ZAR	1.0%	0.8%	▼0.2pp
Polish złoty	PLN	0.7%	0.8%	▲0.1pp
Danish krone	DKK	0.7%	0.7%	Steady
Indonesian rupiah	IDR	0.4%	0.7%	▲0.3pp
Turkish lira	TRY	0.4%	0.5%	▲0.1pp
Thai baht	THB	0.4%	0.5%	▲0.1pp
Israeli new shekel	ILS	0.4%	0.4%	Steady
Hungarian forint	HUF	0.3%	0.4%	▲0.1pp
Czech koruna	CZK	0.4%	0.4%	Steady
Chilean peso	CLP	0.3%	0.3%	Steady
Philippine peso	PHP	0.2%	0.2%	Steady
Colombian peso	COP	0.2%	0.2%	Steady
Malaysian ringgit	MYR	0.2%	0.2%	Steady
UAE dirham	AED	0.4%	0.1%	▼0.3pp
Saudi riyal	SAR	0.2%	0.1%	▼0.1pp
Romanian leu	RON	0.1%	0.1%	Steady
Peruvian sol	PEN	0.1%	0.1%	Steady
Other currencies		2.6%	3.4%	▲0.8pp
Total (Note: The total sum is 200% because each currency trade is counted twice: once for the currency being bought and once for the currency being sold. The percentages above represent the proportion of all trades involving a given currency, regardless of which side of the transaction it is on.)		200.0%	200.0%	

Officially, the Indian rupee has a market-determined exchange rate. However, the Reserve Bank of India trades actively in the USD/INR currency market to impact effective exchange rates. Thus, the currency regime in place for the Indian rupee with respect to the US dollar is a de facto controlled exchange rate. This is sometimes called a "managed float". On 9 May 2022, the Indian rupee traded at ₹77.41 against the US dollar, hitting an all-time low. Other rates (such as the EUR/INR and INR/JPY) have the volatility typical of floating exchange rates, and often create persistent arbitrage opportunities against the RBI. Unlike China, successive administrations (through RBI, the central bank) have not followed a policy of pegging the INR to a specific foreign currency at a particular exchange rate. RBI intervention in currency markets is solely to ensure low volatility in exchange rates, and not to influence the rate (or direction) of the Indian rupee in relation to other currencies.

Also affecting convertibility is a series of customs regulations restricting the import and export of rupees. Legally, only up to ₹25000 can be imported or exported in cash at a time, and the possession of ₹200 and higher notes in Nepal is prohibited. The conversion of currencies for and from rupees is also regulated.

RBI also exercises a system of capital controls in addition to (through active trading) in currency markets. On the current account, there are no currency-conversion restrictions hindering buying or selling foreign exchange (although trade barriers exist). On the capital account, foreign institutional investors face restrictions on convertibility when bring money into/out of the country and buying securities (subject to quantitative restrictions). Local firms can take capital out of the country to expand globally. However, local households are restricted in their ability to diversify globally. Because of the expansion of the current and capital accounts, India is increasingly moving towards full de facto convertibility.

There is some confusion regarding the interchange of the currency with gold, but the system that India follows is that money cannot be exchanged for gold under any circumstances due to gold's lack of liquidity; therefore, money cannot be converted into gold by the RBI. India follows the same principle as Great Britain and the US.

Reserve Bank of India clarifies its position regarding the promissory clause printed on each banknote:

"As per Section 26 of Reserve Bank of India Act, 1934, the Bank is liable to pay the value of banknote. This is payable on demand by RBI, being the issuer. The Bank's obligation to pay the value of banknote does not arise out of a contract but out of statutory provisions. The promissory clause printed on the banknotes i.e., "I promise to pay the bearer an amount of X" is a statement that means that the banknote is a legal tender for X amount. The obligation on the part of the Bank is to exchange a banknote for coins of an equivalent amount."

=== Chronology ===
- 1991 – India began to lift restrictions on its currency. Several reforms removed restrictions on current account transactions (including trade, interest payments, and remittances) and some capital asset-based transactions. Liberalised Exchange Rate Management System (LERMS) (a dual-exchange-rate system) introduced partial convertibility of the rupee in March 1992.
- 1997 – A panel (set up to explore capital account convertibility) recommended that India move towards full convertibility by 2000, but the timetable was abandoned in the wake of the 1997–1998 Asian financial crisis.
- 2006 – Prime Minister Manmohan Singh asked the Finance Minister and the Reserve Bank of India to prepare a road map for moving towards capital account convertibility.
- 2016 – The Government of India announced the demonetisation of all ₹500 and ₹1,000 banknotes of the Mahatma Gandhi Series. The government claimed that the action would curtail the shadow economy and crack down on the use of illicit "black money" and counterfeit cash to fund illegal activity and terrorism.
- 2023 – Reserve Bank of India issued a circular on 19 May stating currency notes of ₹2,000 denomination will be withdrawn from circulation. The reason given for this withdrawal is the decline in the number of currency notes in circulation. According to the circular, there were only 10.8% of Notes in Circulation on March 31, 2023.

== Exchange rates ==
=== Historic exchange rates ===
==== Pre-Independence ====
Graph of exchange rates of Indian rupee (INR) per USD 1, GBP 1, EUR 1, JPY 100 averaged over the month, from September 1998 to May 2013. Data Source: Reserve Bank of India reference rate

For almost a century following the Great Recoinage of 1816, and adoption of the Gold Standard, until the outbreak of World War I, the silver-backed Indian rupee lost its value against a basket of gold-pegged currencies and was periodically devalued to reflect the then current gold to silver reserve ratios. In 1850, the official conversion rate between the pound sterling and the rupee was £0 / 2s / 0d (or £1:₹10), while between 1899 and 1914, the official conversion rate was set at £1 to 1s to 4d (or £1:₹15). However, this was just half of market exchange rates between 1893 and 1917.

The gold-to-silver ratio expanded between 1870 and 1910. Unlike India, Britain was on the gold standard. To meet the Home Charges (i.e., expenditure in the United Kingdom), the colonial government had to remit a larger number of rupees, and this necessitated increased taxation, unrest and nationalism.

Between both world wars, the rate improved from 1s to 6d (or £1:₹13.33), and remained pegged at this rate for the duration of the Bretton Woods agreement, to its devaluation and pegging to the US dollar, at $1:₹7.50, in 1966.

==== Post-Independence ====
Following the country's independence, India implemented a Par value exchange rate regime until 1971. The country switched to a fixed exchange rate regime in 1971 and graduated to a basket peg against five major currencies in 1975. Since 1991, the rupee has been under a floating exchange rate regime.

The first major impact on the rupee's exchange rate after independence was the devaluation of the pound sterling against the US dollar in 1949, which impacted currencies that maintained a peg to the sterling, which included the Indian rupee. In 1966, the Indian rupee was devalued by 57% against United States dollar, which also led to the depreciation of the sterling. Five years later, when the Bretton Woods system was suspended, India initially announced that it would maintain a fixed rate of $1 to ₹ 7.50 and leave the sterling under a floating regime. However, by the end of 1971, following the Smithsonian Agreement and the subsequent devaluation of the US dollar, India pegged the rupee with the pound sterling once again at a rate of £1 to ₹ 18.9677. During this period, India had a non-commercial exchange rate with the Soviet Union. The ruble to rupee exchange rates was announced by the Soviet Union, as the ruble was not a freely traded currency and the commercial trade between both nations used to take place in rupees following a treaty between India and the Soviet Union in 1953.

In September 1975, the exchange rate of the Indian rupee started to be determined based on the basket peg. The details of currencies which form the basket, and their weightage were kept confidentially by Reserve Bank of India and the exchange rate of the rupee based on market fluctuation of these currencies was periodically announced by the RBI.

The next major change that occurred was the devaluation of the rupee by about 18% in July 1991 following the balance of payments crisis. Thereafter, in March 1992, the Liberalized Exchange Rate Management System was introduced, enabling the transition to a floating exchange rate regime.

Indian rupees per currency unit averaged over the year
Currency	ISO code	1947	1966	1995	1996	2000	2004	2006	2007	2008	2009	2010	2013	2014	2015	2016	2017	2018	2019	2020	2021	2022	2023
Australian dollar	AUD	–	5.33	–	27.69	26.07	33.28	34.02	34.60	36.81	38.22	42.00	56.36	54.91	48.21	49.96	49.91	50.64	50.01	56.30			
Bahraini dinar	BHD	–	13.35	91.75	91.24	117.78	120.39	120.40	109.59	115.65	128.60	121.60	155.95	164.55	170.6	178.3	–	169.77					
Bangladeshi taka	BDT	–	–	0.84	0.84	0.77	0.66	0.63	0.57	0.71	0.66	0.68	0.80	0.88	0.84	0.85	–	0.76					
Canadian dollar	CAD	–	5.90	23.63	26.00	30.28	34.91	41.09	42.92	44.59	52.17	44.39	56.88	49.53	47.94	52.32	50.21	51.38					
Renminbi	CNY	–	–	–	–	–	–	–	–	5.80	–	–	–	9.93	10.19	10.15	–	9.81					
Emirate dirham	AED	–	–	–	–	–	–	–	–	–	–	–	–	–	17.47	18.26	17.73	17.80					
Euro^{a}	EUR	–	–	42.41	44.40	41.52	56.38	64.12	68.03	60.59	65.69	–	–	70.21	72.60	75.84	73.53	79.52					
Israeli shekel^{b}	ILS	13.33	21.97	11.45	10.76	10.83	–	–	–	–	–	–	–	17.08	16.57	17.47	–	18.36					
Japanese yen^{c}	JPY	6.6	2.08	32.66	32.96	41.79	41.87	38.93	35.00	42.27	51.73	52.23	60.07	57.79	53.01	62.36	–	56					
Kuwaiti dinar	KWD	–	17.80	115.5	114.5	144.9	153.3	155.5	144.6	161.7	167.7	159.2	206.5	214.3	213.1	222.4		211.43					
Malaysian ringgit	MYR	1.55	2.07	12.97	14.11	11.84	11.91	12.36	11.98	13.02	13.72	14.22	18.59	18.65	16.47	16.37	–	15.72					
Maldivian rufiyaa	MVR	1.00	1.33	2.93	2.91	–	–	–	–	–	–	–	4.58	4.76	5.01	5.23	–	4.13					
Pakistani rupee	PKR	1.00	1.33	1.08	0.95	0.80	0.77	0.75	0.67	0.61	0.59	0.53	0.57	0.60	0.62	0.64	–	0.57	0.46	0.45			
Pound sterling	GBP	13.33	17.76	51.14	55.38	68.11	83.06	80.63	76.38	71.33	83.63	70.63	91.08	100.51	98.11	92.00	83.87	90.37					
Russian ruble^{d}	RUB	6.60	15.00	7.56	6.69	1.57	–	–	–	–	–	–	–	–	1.05	0.99	–	1.10					
Saudi riyal	SAR	–	1.41	–	–	–	–	–	–	–	–	–	–	–	17.11	17.88	–	17.02					
Singapore dollar / Brunei dollar^{e}	SGD / BND	1.55	2.07	23.13	25.16	26.07	26.83	30.93	33.60	34.51	41.27	33.58	46.84	45.86	46.67	48.86	–	47.70					
Sri Lankan rupee	LKR	–	1.33	0.63	0.64	0.58	–	–	–	–	–	–	0.47	0.46	0.45	0.46	–	0.41	0.39	0.39			
Swiss franc	CHF	–	1.46	27.48	–	–	–	–	–	–	–	43.95	66.95	66.71	66.70	68.40	–	65.48					
US dollar	USD	3.30	7.50	32.45	35.44	44.20	45.34	43.95	39.50	48.76	45.33	45.00	68.80	66.07	66.73	67.19	65.11	72.10	74.20	74.50	82.62	83.25	
^{a} Before 1 January 1999, the European Currency Unit (ECU)^{b} Before 1980, the Israeli pound (ILP)^{c} 100 Japanese yen^{d} Before 1993, the Soviet ruble (SUR), in 1995 and 1996 – per 1000 rubles^{e} Before 1967, the Malaya and British Borneo dollar

=== Current exchange rates ===
Current INR exchange rates
From Google Finance:	AUD CAD CHF CNY EUR GBP HKD JPY USD AED
From Yahoo! Finance:	AUD CAD CHF CNY EUR GBP HKD JPY USD AED
From XE.com:	AUD CAD CHF CNY EUR GBP HKD JPY USD AED
From OANDA:	AUD CAD CHF CNY EUR GBP HKD JPY USD AED

== Worldwide rupee usage ==
As the Straits Settlements were originally an outpost of the British East India Company, the Indian rupee was made the sole official currency of the Straits Settlements in 1837, as it was administered as part of British India. This attempt was resisted by the locals. However, Spanish dollars continued to circulate and 1845 saw the introduction of coinage for the Straits Settlements using a system of 100 cents = 1 dollar, with the dollar equal to the Spanish dollar or Mexican peso. In 1867, the administration of the Straits Settlements was separated from India and the Straits dollar was made the standard currency, and attempts to reintroduce the rupee were finally abandoned.

After the Partition of India, the Pakistani rupee came into existence, initially using Indian coins and Indian currency notes simply over-stamped with "Pakistan". Previously the Indian rupee was an official currency of other countries, including Aden, Oman, Dubai, Kuwait, Bahrain, Qatar, the Trucial States, Kenya, Tanganyika, Uganda, the Seychelles and Mauritius.

The Indian government introduced the Gulf rupee as a replacement for the Indian rupee for circulation outside the country with the Reserve Bank of India (Amendment) Act of 1 May 1959. The creation of a separate currency was an attempt to reduce the strain on India's foreign reserves from gold smuggling. After India devalued the rupee on 6 June 1966, those countries still using it – Oman, Qatar, and the Trucial States (which became the United Arab Emirates in 1971) – replaced the Gulf rupee with their own currencies. Kuwait and Bahrain had already done so in 1961 with the Kuwaiti dinar and in 1965 with the Bahraini dinar, respectively.

The Bhutanese ngultrum is pegged at par with the Indian rupee; both currencies are accepted in Bhutan. The Nepalese rupee is pegged at ₹0.625; the Indian rupee is accepted in Bhutan, except ₹500 and ₹1000 banknotes of the Mahatma Gandhi Series and the ₹200, ₹500 banknotes of the Mahatma Gandhi New Series, which are not legal tender in Bhutan and Nepal and are banned by their respective governments. On 29 January 2014, Zimbabwe added the Indian rupee as a legal tender to be used.

== See also ==
- British currency in the Middle East
- Coinage of India
- Coins of British India – Coinage used in British-ruled India
- Coins of the Indian rupee
  - Anna (monetary subunit) – British India currency unit, 1/16 of a rupee
  - Pie (monetary subunit) – Unit of currency in British India
- Digital rupee – Central bank digital currency of India
- Fake Indian currency note – Currency Note
- Great Depression in India
- History of the taka – History of a medieval Asian currency
- Paisa – Idiom and monetary unit
  - Indian paisa – Subdivision of the Indian rupee
- Reserve Bank of India – Central bank of India
  - RBI Monetary Museum – Museum in India
  - Reserve Bank of India Act, 1934 – Act of Imperial Legislative Council of India
- Rupee – Common name for several currencies
  - History of the rupee
- The Standard Reference Guide to Indian Paper Money
- Zero-rupee note – Indian imitation banknote to protest corruption
