= Indian 1-rupee note =

Smallest value Indian banknote

One Rupee
- Country: India
- Value: ₹1
- Width: 97 mm
- Height: 63 mm mm
- Weight: 90 GSM g
- Security features: Watermark
- Material used: 100% (Cotton) Rag Content
- Years of printing: 1917–1926; 1940–1995; 2015–

Obverse
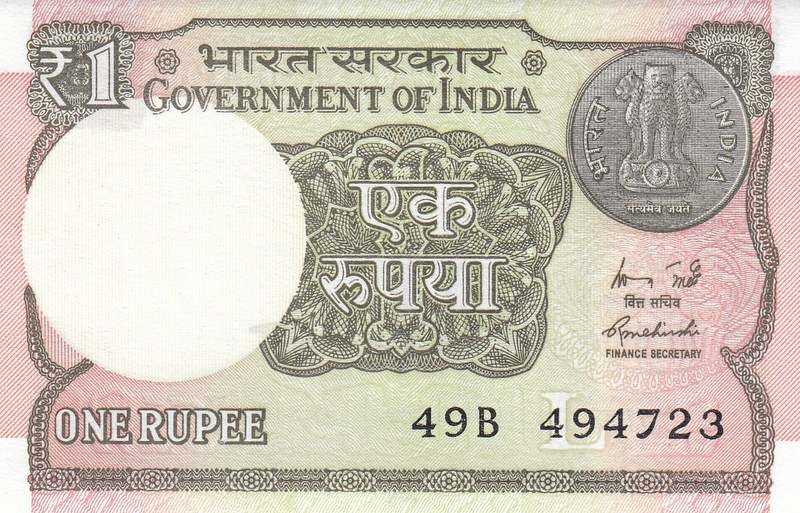
- Design: One-rupee coin

Reverse
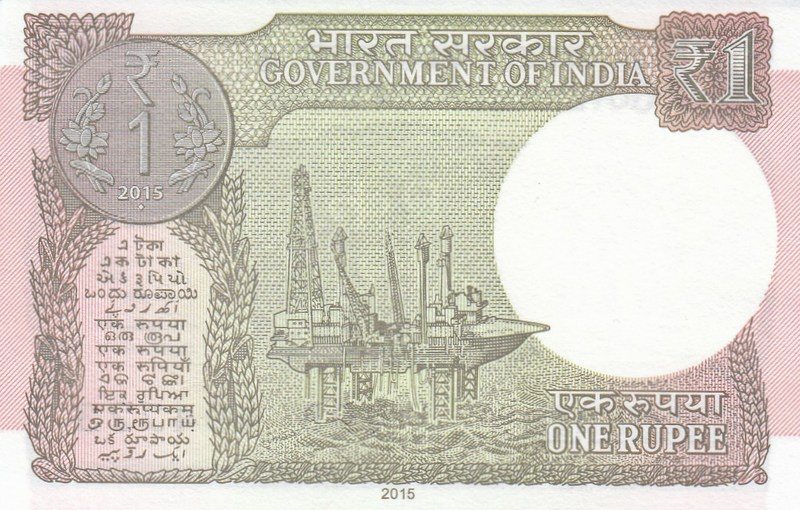
- Design: Sagar Samrat oil rig

The Indian 1-rupee note (₹1) is made up of hundred 100 paise as ₹1 = 100 paise. Currently, it is the smallest Indian banknote in circulation and the only one being issued by the Government of India, as all other banknotes in circulation are issued by the Reserve Bank of India. As a result, the one rupee note is the only note bearing the signature of the Finance Secretary and not the Governor of the RBI. Predominantly pinkish green paper is used during printing.

First introduced on 30 November 1917 during British Raj, the ₹1 note was initially used to conserve metal during World War I. Its production was discontinued in 1926 but resumed in 1940, continuing through post-independence India until 1994, when printing was halted again due to cost concerns. After a hiatus of more than 20 years, the Government of India reintroduced the one-rupee note on 5 March 2015, with the first release occurring at the Shrinathji Temple in Rajasthan. The reintroduced note bore the signature of then-Finance Secretary Rajiv Mehrishi. Further confirmation of its reissuance came in the form of a notification published in The Gazette of India on 7 February 2020.

The printing of the one-rupee note is handled by the Security Printing and Minting Corporation of India Ltd (SPMCIL) at its facilities in Nashik and Dewas, which are also responsible for other currency and security documents. Though the note visually references the ₹1 coin, actual minting of coins is carried out at mints located in Mumbai, Kolkata, Hyderabad, and Noida.

== Languages ==
As like the other Indian rupee banknotes, the ₹1 banknote has its amount written in 17 languages. On the obverse, the denomination is written in English and Hindi. On the reverse is a language panel which displays the denomination of the note in 15 of the 22 official languages of India. The languages are displayed in alphabetical order. Languages included on the panel are Assamese, Bengali, Gujarati, Kannada, Kashmiri, Konkani, Malayalam, Marathi, Nepali, Odia, Punjabi, Sanskrit, Tamil, Telugu and Urdu.

Denominations in central level official languages (At below either ends)
| Language | ₹1 |
|---|---|
| English | One rupee |
| Hindi | एक रुपया |
Denominations in 15 state level/other official languages (As seen on the language panel)
| Assamese | এক টকা |
| Bengali | এক টাকা |
| Gujarati | એક રૂપિયો |
| Kannada | ಒಂದು ರುಪಾಯಿ |
| Kashmiri | اَکھ رۄپَے |
| Konkani | एक रुपया |
| Malayalam | ഒരു രൂപ |
| Marathi | एक रुपया |
| Nepali | एक रुपियाँ |
| Odia | ଏକ ଟଙ୍କା |
| Punjabi | ਇਕ ਰੁਪਈਆ |
| Sanskrit | एकरूप्यकम् |
| Tamil | ஒரு ரூபாய் |
| Telugu | ఒక రూపాయి |
| Urdu | ایک روپیہ |

== Gallery ==
British Indian one rupee note
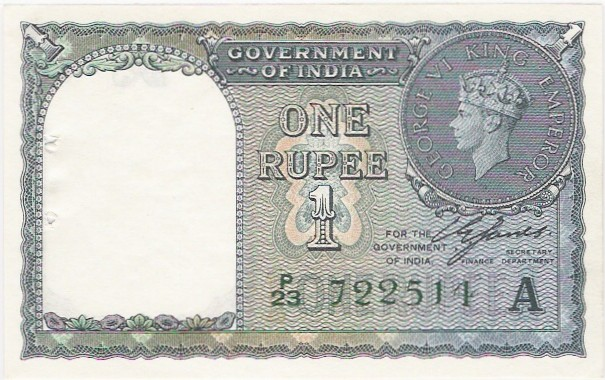
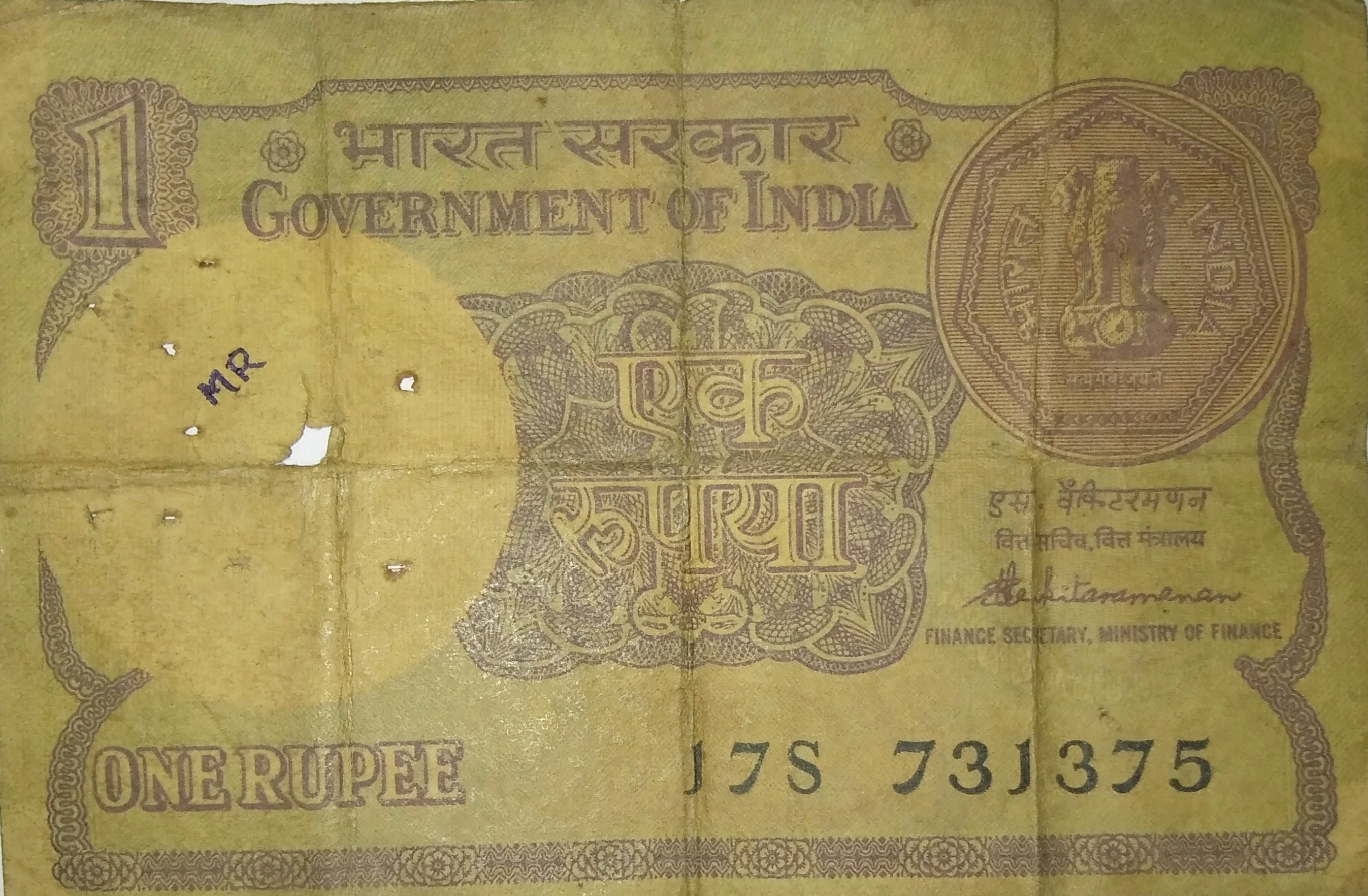
Indian one rupee note
Indian one rupee note
