= 5 naye paise =

Indian unit of currency

Five naye paise पाँच नए पैसे
- India
- Value: 1/20 of Indian rupee
- Mass: 4.0 g (62.5 gr)
- Diameter: 22 mm (0.87 in)
- Thickness: 1.67 mm (0.066 in)
- Edge: Smooth
- Composition: Cupronickel
- Years of minting: 1957–1963
- Mintage: 4,294,967,295
- Mint marks: ⧫ = Bombay; B = Bombay proof issue * = Hyderabad ⟐ = Hyderabad; No mark = Calcutta
- Circulation: Demonetized
- Catalog number: KM# 16

Obverse
- Design: State Emblem of India with country name.

Reverse
- Design: Face value, year and value in Hindi (रूपये का बीसवाँ भाग; Eng: Twentieth of a rupee)

The Indian five naye paise (Hindi: पाँच नए पैसे) (singular: Paisa), was a unit of currency equaling 1/20 of the Indian rupee. The symbol for paisa is p.

== History ==
Prior to 1957, the Indian rupee was not decimalised and the rupee from 1835 to 1957 AD was further divided into 16 annas. Each anna was further divided to four pices and each pice into three pies till 1947 when the pie was demonetized. In 1955, India amended the "Indian Coinage Act" to adopt the metric system for coinage. Paisa coins were introduced in 1957, but from 1957 to 1964 the coin was called "Naya Paisa" (English: New Paisa. Plural: Naye paise). On 1 June 1964, the term "Naya" was dropped and the denomination was simply called "One paisa" (or paise for denomination greater than one). Paisa coins were issued as a part of "The Decimal Series".

== Mintage ==
Five naye paise coins were minted from 1957 to 1963 at the India Government mint in Bombay (present day Mumbai) and borne ⧫ (small dot/diamond) symbol mint mark. Five naye paise coins have been demonetized.

=== Total mintage ===
Total 4,294,967,295 coins were minted from 1957 to 1963.

=== Composition ===
Five naye paise coins were minted from cupronickel alloy in medallic alignment. Coins weighed 4.0 grams, had a diameter of 22 millimetres (0.87 in) and thickness of 1.67 millimetres (0.066 in). Five naye paise coins were quadrangular shaped and had smooth edge.

== Variants ==
Variants (1957-1963).
Image		Value	Technical parameters				Description			Year of minting		Monetary status
Obverse	Reverse	Value	Weight	Diameter	Thickness	Metal	Edge	Obverse	Reverse	First	Last	Monetary status
		5 naye paise	4.0 g	22 mm	1.67 mm	Cupronickel	Smooth	State Emblem of India & country name in Hindi and English.	Face-value and year.	1957	1963	Demonetized.

== See also ==
- Indian paisa
