= Banknotes of the Indian rupee =

Banknotes of the Indian rupee include:

- Lion Capital Series: Banknotes of the Indian rupee printed between 1962–2000.
- Mahatma Gandhi Series: Banknotes of the Indian rupee printed between 1996–2018.
- Mahatma Gandhi New Series: Banknotes of the Indian rupee printed from 2016 to present.

== See also ==
- Coins of the Indian rupee
