= High Denomination Bank Notes (Demonetisation) Act, 1978 =

Act of the Indian Parliament

Parliament of India
- Long title: An Act to provide in the public interest for the demonetisation of certain high denomination bank notes and for matters connected therewith or incidental thereto
- Citation: Act XI of 1978
- Territorial extent: India
- Passed by: Lok Sabha
- Passed: 16 January 1978
- Enacted by: Rajya Sabha

Legislative history

Initiating chamber: Lok Sabha
- Bill title: Number 20 of 1978

Amended by
- High Denomination Bank Notes (Demonetisation) Amendment Act, 1998

Related legislation
- Bank Notes (Declaration of Holdings) Ordinance, 1946; High Denomination Bank Notes (Demonetisation) Ordinance, 1946
- Status: Repealed

The High Denomination Bank Notes (Demonetisation) Act, 1978 was an act of the Indian Parliament that demonetized the high-denomination banknotes of ₹1000, ₹5000, and ₹10000. It was first introduced as the High Denomination Bank Notes (Demonetisation) Ordinance, 1978, by the then President of India Neelam Sanjiva Reddy. The then Prime Minister of India, Morarji Desai of Janata Party, and Finance Minister Hirubhai M. Patel were considered key architects of the policy, while RBI Governor I. G. Patel was opposed to it.

As a result of this legislation, 93% of the total currency notes in circulation were exchanged, while the remaining went out of circulation or were not exchanged. It was repealed by the Jan Vishwas (Amendment of Provisions) Act, 2023.

== History ==
=== Demonetisation Ordinance, 1946 ===
The first demonetisation of India was carried out in the year 1946 when, under the then Governor General of India, Field Marshal Archibald Wavell, 1st Earl Wavell, the Reserve Bank of India demonetised notes of ₹500, ₹1000, and ₹10,000 in order to check black market operations and tax evasions. This was done via 2 ordinances. The first ordinance, the Bank Notes (Declaration of Holdings) Ordinance, 1946, required all banks and government treasuries in British India to furnish a statement of the amount of bank notes they were holding as of 11 January 1946. The second ordinance, the High Denomination Bank Notes (Demonetisation) Ordinance, 1946, demonetised bank notes of denominations ₹500 and above. While the exchanging of notes was initially allowed only until 9 February 1946, it was extended multiple times. By the end of 1947, out of a total of Rs. 143.97 crore of high denomination banknotes, notes of the value of Rs. 134.90 crore were exchanged and notes worth Rs. 9.07 crore went out of circulation or were not exchanged. It is pertinent to note that this action was opposed by the then Governor of RBI, Shri C.D. Deshmukh.

=== Passage in the Parliament ===
The Act was passed by consideration in both Houses of Parliament and supreme court, and was implemented by an issue of an ordinance on 16 January 1978, which was later made an Act, from 30 March 1978.

== The Act ==
=== Preamble ===
The Preamble to the Demonetisation Act, 1978 highlighted the need for demonetisation of certain high denominations bank notes in the public interest. The reason this was considered necessary was because high-denomination bank notes were considered detrimental to the Indian economy due to their use for illegal purposes.

=== Details ===
The Demonetisation Act of 1978 has fifteen sections.

Section 2 details the usage of bank notes in Act.

=== Amendment of 1998 ===
Section 2 of the Act was amended in the winter session of Indian Parliament in 1998. Following a discussion in the 1998 winter session of Indian Parliament, the bill was introduced, by the then Finance minister Yashwant Sinha to reintroduce ₹1000 banknotes, due to claims of shortage of high-denomination notes and increasing pressure on lower denominations.

== Opposition ==
The constitutional validity of 1978 Act of Demonetisation was challenged in the Supreme Court of India, on the claimed grounds that it violated the then Fundamental Right of property. The Constitutional bench of the Supreme Court of India rejected the petitioners' plea, and upheld the Constitutional validity of Demonetisation Act, 1978.

== Aftermath ==
The chief economic advisor of the State Bank of India affirmed that 25% of the proscribed currency notes did not return to the banking system during the 1978 demonetisation episode.

== See also ==
- 2016 Indian banknote demonetisation
- List of acts of the Parliament of India
