= Mercator (company) =

Indian shipping company

Mercator Limited
- Type: Public
- Traded as: BSE: 526235; NSE: MERCATOR
- Industry: Shipping, coal, dredging, offshore oil and logistics
- Founded: 1983, Mumbai
- Headquarters: Mumbai, Maharashtra, India
- Key people: H. K. Mittal, Chairman & Atul J. Agarwal, MD
- Revenue: ₹683.90 crore (US$72 million)

Mercator Limited was an Indian company. It was earlier known as Mercator Lines Ltd. The Mercator group of companies has diversified business interests in coal, oil and gas, commodity transportation and dredging. Mercator Limited (formerly Mercator Lines Ltd.) is the parent company and was the second largest private sector shipping company in India, and it is based in Mumbai. It was amongst the highest wealth creators in the Indian stock exchanges between 2000 -2010.

It suffered greatly after 2008 financial crises which led all commodities crashing along with the greatest and longest downturn in the Shipping Industry with the indexes crashing over 95% from its peak in 2008 to its lows in 2015.

The company won many awards including Best Company by Business Standard and Economic Times in 2007 and 2008.

It was only the second Indian company to list its Singapore subsidiary on the Singapore Stock Exchange in Singapore in 2007. Mercator Lines (Singapore) Pte Ltd went on to win many corporate governance awards, only Indian company to do so.

== History ==
Mercator Ltd was incorporated on 24 November 1983 as a private limited company. It was converted into a public limited company on 3 April 1984.

Since its maiden public issue in 1993, it has grown in terms of financial parameters like turnover, profits, tonnage and market capitalisation. Presently the shares of the company are listed on Mumbai Stock Exchange and National Stock Exchange. During April 2005, the Company completed its first international offering of Foreign Currency Convertible Bonds aggregating US$60 mn.

The company also added new business segment namely offshore drilling with acquisition of Jack-Up Rig. The rig received ahead of its schedule; was deployed immediately upon delivery in March 2009; for a period of three years on firm bare boat charter. The group has opted out of the offshore drilling segment w.e.f. March 2011 as strategic decision.

Mercator Group has also acquired economic interest in coal mines in Mozambique and Indonesia with substantial coal resources; as a measure of backward integration to strengthen its shipping activities and to meet the huge energy demand in India. The commercial operations in Indonesia have already commenced.

== Tankers ==
Mercator commenced its Wet Bulk business in 1998 by acquiring the vessel M. T. Richa (9,750 DWT) and entered into crude oil transportation in 2003. In a very short span of time, it has grown to be amongst the major Indian companies in this segment. Mercator is the second largest tanker owners in the private sector in India in terms of tonnage. The company operates its fleet as a mix of spot contracts (single-voyage) and period contracts (fixed-term). The Company presently has a consolidated DWT of 760,189 tones for this segment.

In addition to its usage for transportation of cargo, tankers can also be used as offshore storage facilities. The company has one such modern Aframax tanker on a long-term period contract.

Mercator also is the first Indian company to have its complete Tanker fleet of double hull.

== Dry Bulk Carriers ==
Mercator's Dry Bulk shipping business is handled through its Singapore listed subsidiary, Mercator Lines (Singapore) Limited (MLS). Commencing operations in 2005, it has established a market presence in the Indian coal transport market, specialising in the transportation of dry bulk commodities, such as coal into India from Australia and Indonesia; and iron ore from India to countries such as China.

Mercator's network strength in the Indian markets helps maximise the capacity usage efficiencies by utilizing its ships on the triangular route of Indonesia – India – China – Indonesia.

Mercator also provides its customers with shipping. The Group primarily services large thermal-based power plants and steel companies, and has established strong relationships with reputed end-user customers such as Vale, Tata Power, Arcelor Mittal Group, and COSCO to name a few.

MLS presently controls an operating fleet of 18 vessels including a VLOC, which is the largest bulk carrier in India and Singapore.

== Coal & Logistics ==
Mercator Ltd has been in business of Coal transportation & Logistics since 1995 & served many Thermal Power Station in India.

Mercator Ltd entered into coal business in 2008 as backward integration.

Mercator Ltd acquired coal mines in Indonesia with substantial coal resources, as a measure of backward integration.

== Oil & Gas ==
Mercator placed the order for a Jack Up Rig in November 2007 with Keppel FELLS Ltd which was delivered in 2009 & was immediately contracted to one of private sector shipping company in India. The Group has opted out of the Offshore Drilling segment wef March 2011 as strategic decision.

=== Floating Production Unit (MOPU + FSO) ===
In 2010, Mercator won a contract for Charter of a Floating Production Unit (FPU), which is a combination of a MOPU and an FSO, from Afren Plc., a UK listed Company, with worldwide operations in oil exploration. To execute this, Mercator provided Engineering, Procurement, Construction, Installation and Commissioning (EPCIC) services successfully at an oil field in Nigeria, with the services customised as per the requirements of the Charterer. This project was executed in 432 days, working around the clock and coordinating the project from various parts of the world. Mercator is currently operating the FPU at the Ebok field in Nigeria.
