= Lavender (color) =

Light shade of purple derived from the lavender plant

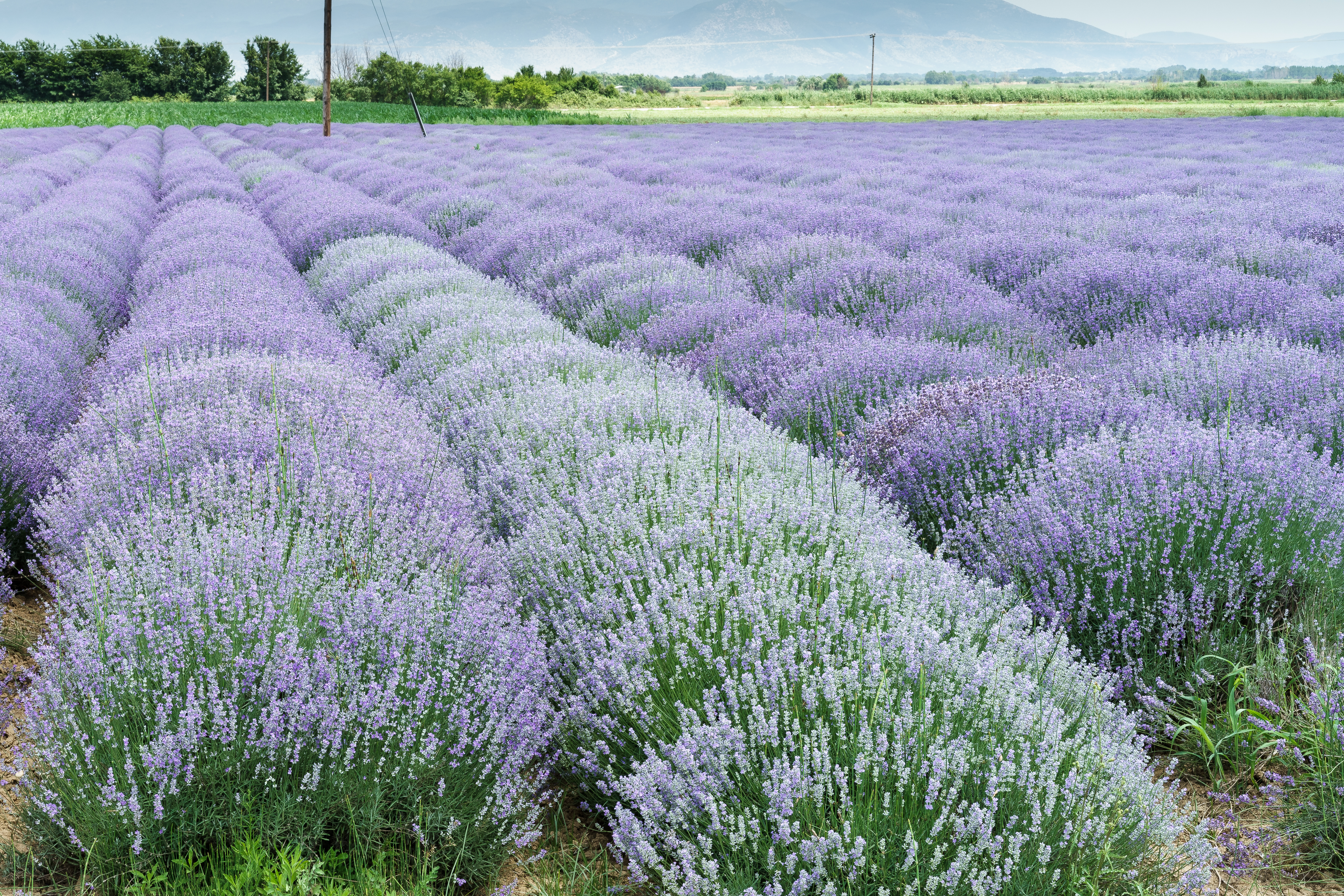
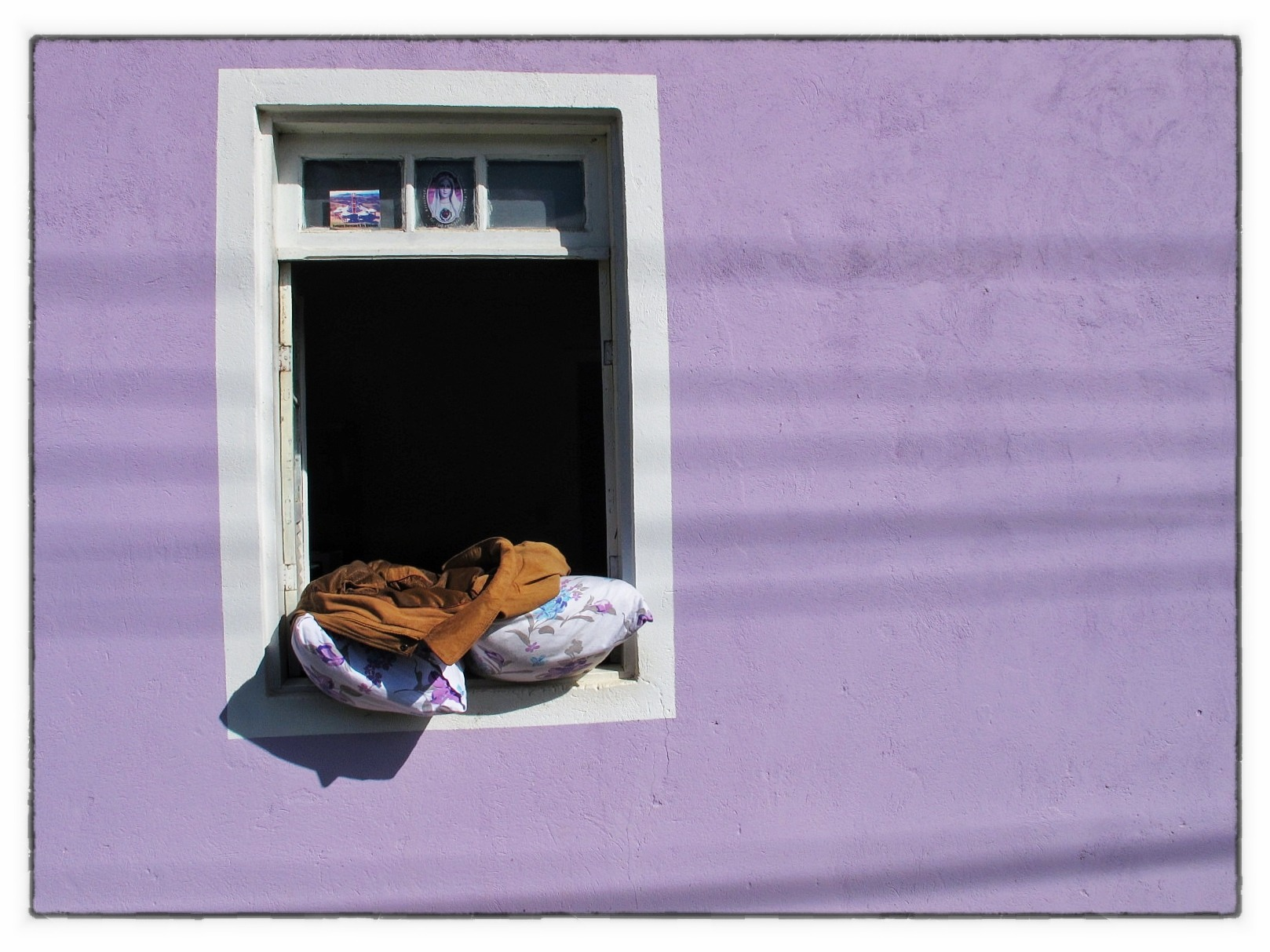
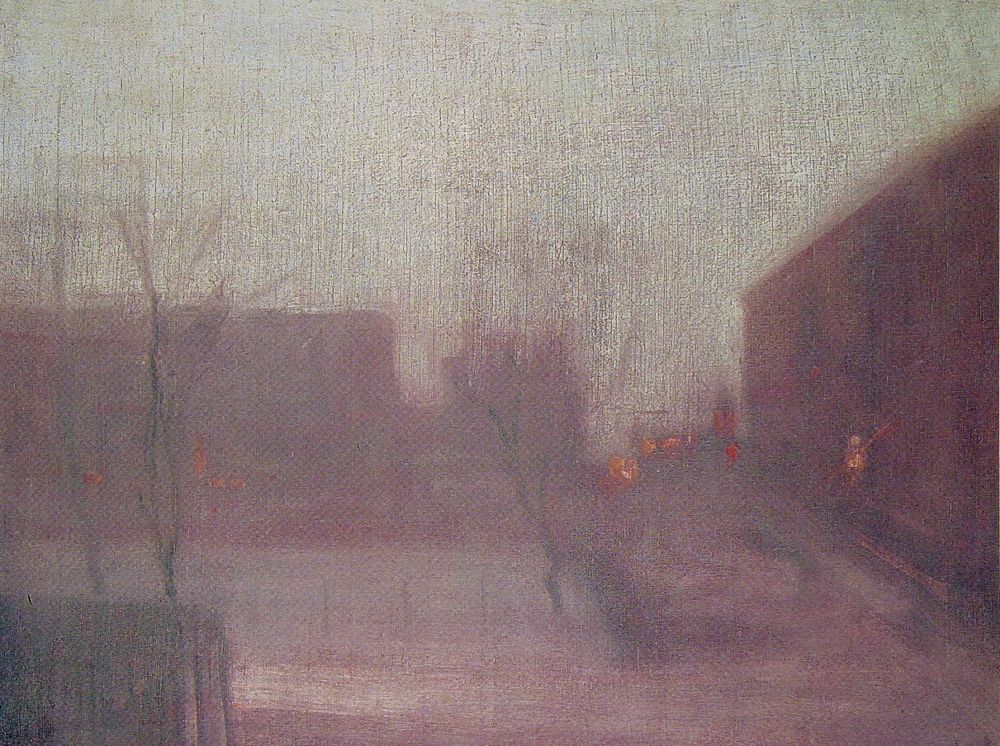
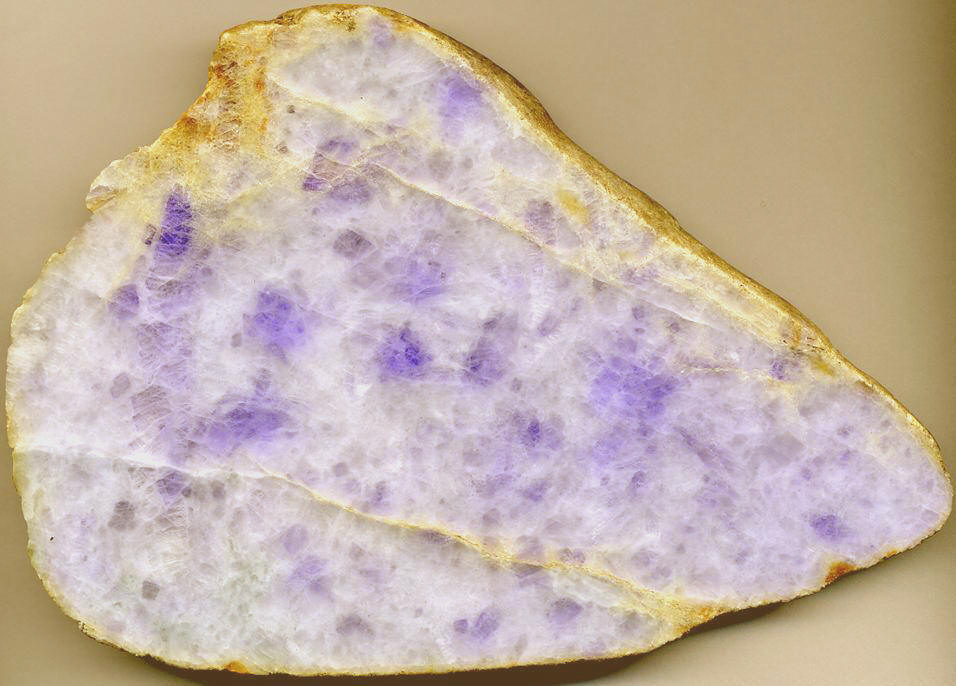
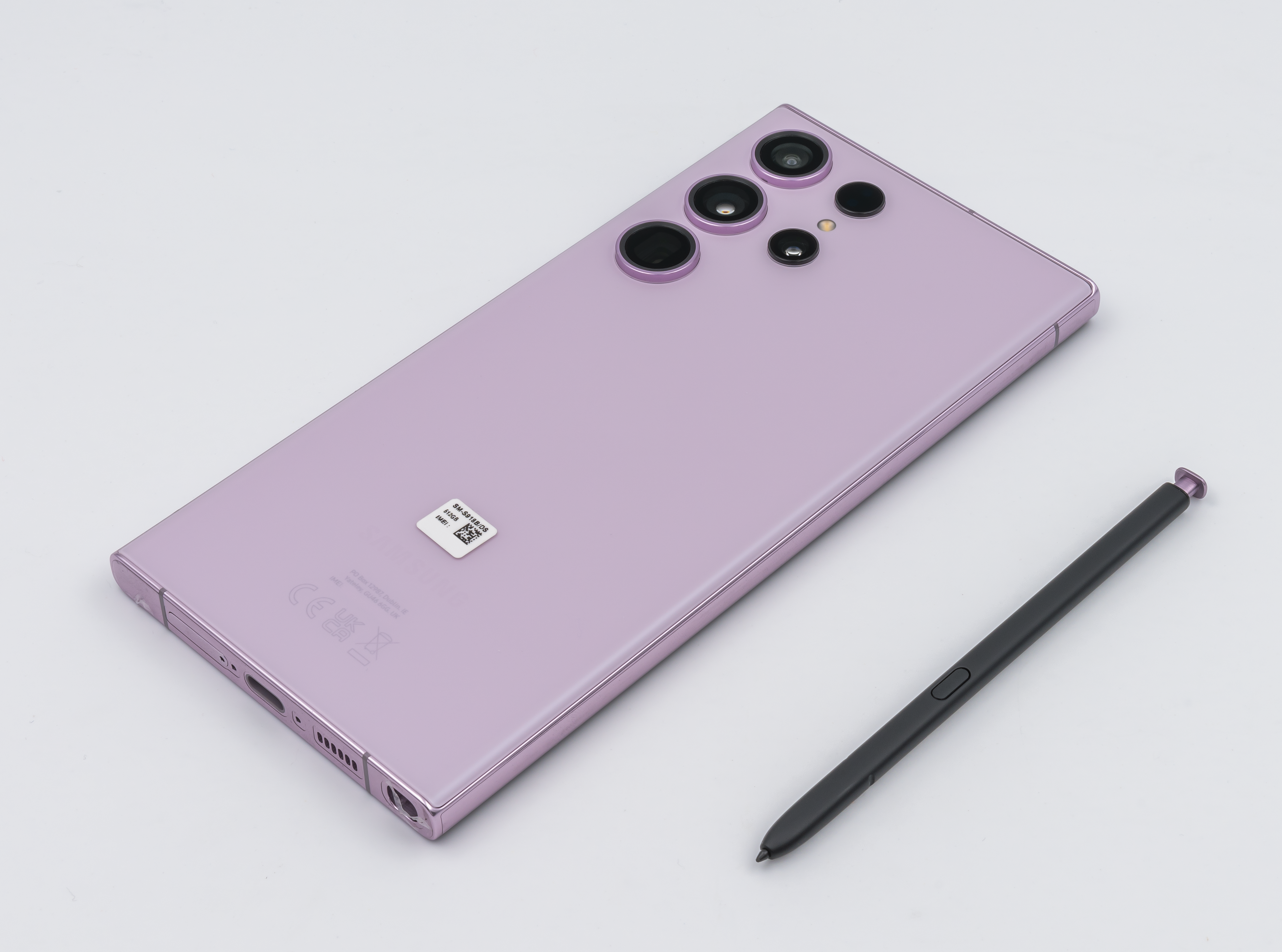
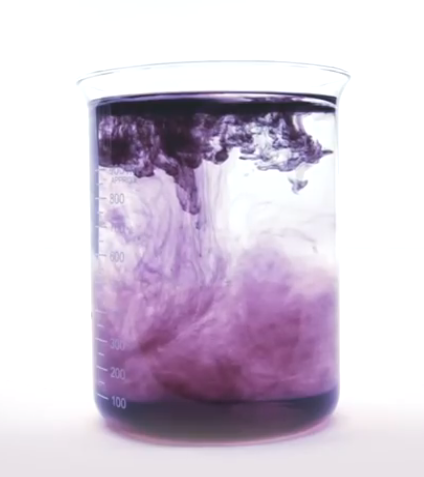
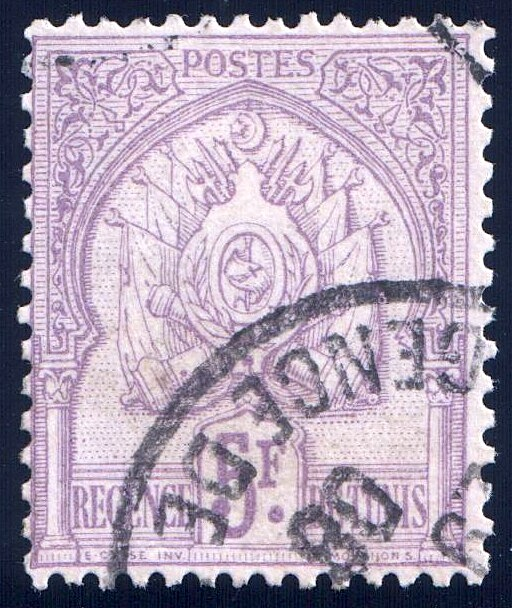
- Clockwise, from top left: Fields of lavender; Facade of a house in Brazil; A Samsung Galaxy S23 phone; A Tunisian stamp; Solution of bipyridine in water; Nocturne: Trafalgar Square Chelsea Snow by James McNeill Whistler; Lavender jadeitite.

Common connotations
- LGBTQ, calmness, homosexuality

Color coordinates
- Hex triplet: #E6E6FA
- sRGB^{B} (r, g, b): (230, 230, 250)
- HSV (h, s, v): (240°, 8%, 98%)
- CIELCh_{uv} (L, C, h): (92, 16, 266°)
- Source: X11, HSV
- ISCC–NBS descriptor: Very pale blue
- B: Normalized to [0–255] (byte)

Lavender is a light shade of purple or violet. It applies particularly to the color of the flower of the same name.

The color lavender might be described as a medium purple, a pale bluish purple, or a light pinkish-purple. The term lavender may be used in general to apply to a wide range of pale, light, or grayish-purples, but only on the blue side; lilac is pale purple on the pink side. In paints, the color lavender is made by mixing purple and white paint.

The web color called lavender, displayed adjacent, matches the color of the palest part of the flower. However, the more saturated color known as floral lavender more closely matches the average color of the lavender flower, and is the tone of lavender historically and traditionally considered lavender by average people as opposed to website designers.

== Historical development of the concept of the color ==
The first recorded use of the word lavender as a color term in English was in 1705.

Originally, the name lavender only applied to flowers. By 1930, the book A Dictionary of Color identified three major shades of lavender—[floral] lavender, lavender gray, and lavender blue, and in addition a fourth shade of lavender called old lavender (a darker lavender gray) (all four of these shades of lavender are shown below). By 1955, the publication of the ISCC-NBS Dictionary of Color Names (a color dictionary used by stamp collectors to identify the colors of stamps), now on the Internet, listed dozens of different shades of lavender. Today, although the color floral lavender (the color of the flower of the lavender plant) remains the standard for lavender, just as there are many shades of pink (light red, light rose, and light magenta colors), there are many shades of lavender (some light magenta, some light purple, [mostly] light violet [as well as some grayish-violet], and some light indigo colors).

== Variations ==
=== Amethyst ===
Amethyst

Color coordinates
- Hex triplet: #9966CC
- sRGB^{B} (r, g, b): (153, 102, 204)
- HSV (h, s, v): (270°, 50%, 80%)
- CIELCh_{uv} (L, C, h): (53, 76, 283°)
- Source: htmlcsscolor
- ISCC–NBS descriptor: Vivid violet
- B: Normalized to [0–255] (byte)

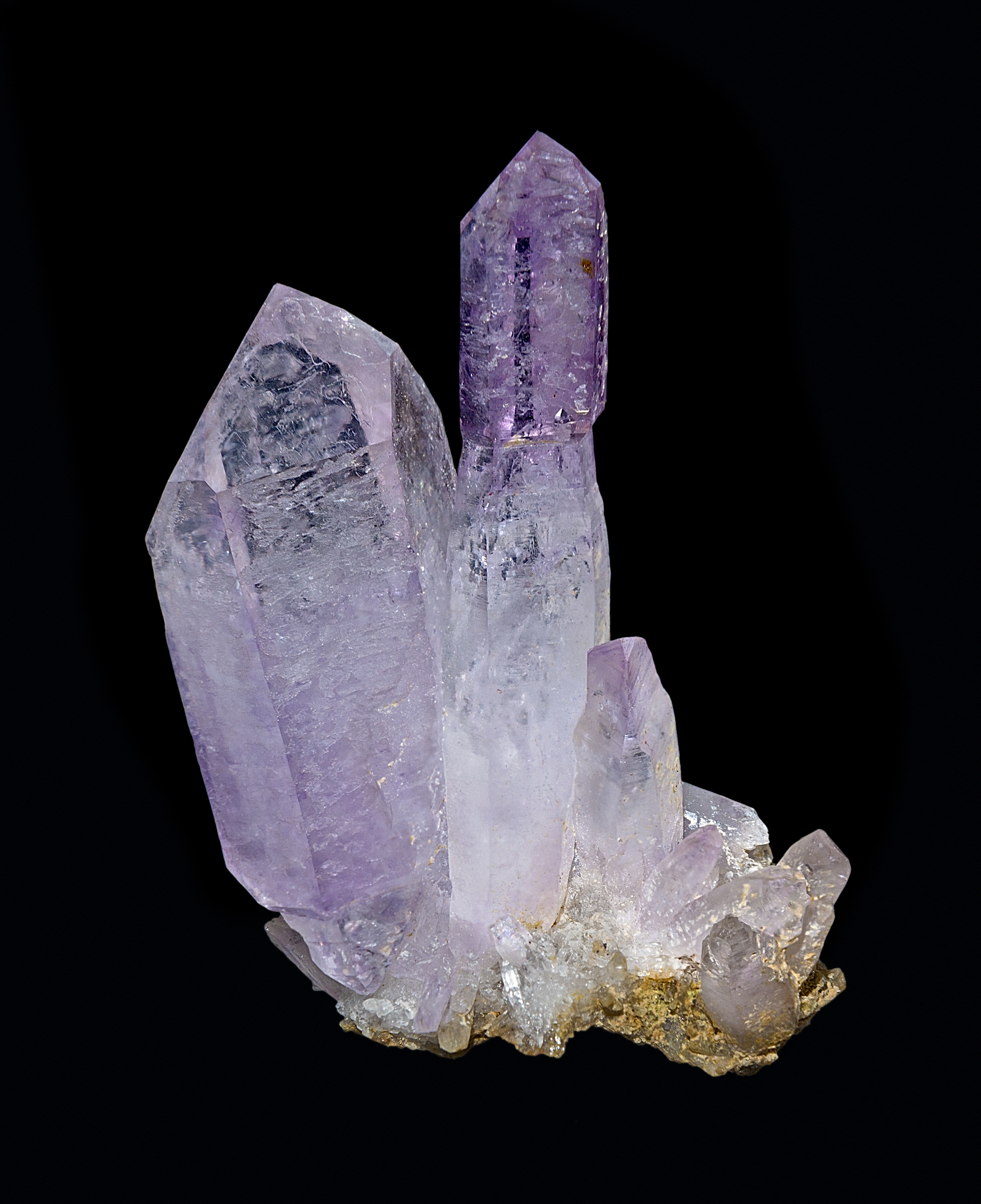
Amethyst crystals

The color amethyst is a moderate, transparent violet. Its name is derived from the stone amethyst, a form of quartz. Amethyst is the birthstone for those born in February.

The first recorded use of amethyst as a color name in English was in 1572.

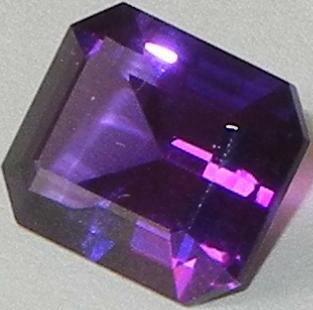
Faceted amethyst

Though the color of natural amethyst varies from purple to yellow, the amethyst color referred to here is the moderate purple color most commonly associated with amethyst stones. There is disagreement as to the cause of the purple color of the amethyst stone. Some believe that the color is due to the presence of manganese, while others have suggested that the amethyst color could be from ferric thiocyanate or sulfur found in amethyst stones.

=== Deep lavender (web color medium purple) ===
Medium purple

Color coordinates
- Hex triplet: #9370DB
- sRGB^{B} (r, g, b): (147, 112, 219)
- HSV (h, s, v): (260°, 49%, 86%)
- CIELCh_{uv} (L, C, h): (55, 83, 276°)
- Source: X11
- ISCC–NBS descriptor: Vivid violet
- B: Normalized to [0–255] (byte)

Displayed at right is the web color medium purple which is equivalent to deep medium violet or deep lavender.

=== English lavender ===
English lavender

Color coordinates
- Hex triplet: #B48395
- sRGB^{B} (r, g, b): (180, 131, 149)
- HSV (h, s, v): (338°, 27%, 71%)
- CIELCh_{uv} (L, C, h): (60, 30, 347°)
- Source: Pantone TPX
- ISCC–NBS descriptor: Grayish purplish red
- B: Normalized to [0–255] (byte)

Displayed at right is the color English lavender.

English lavender is a medium light tone of grayish pinkish lavender.

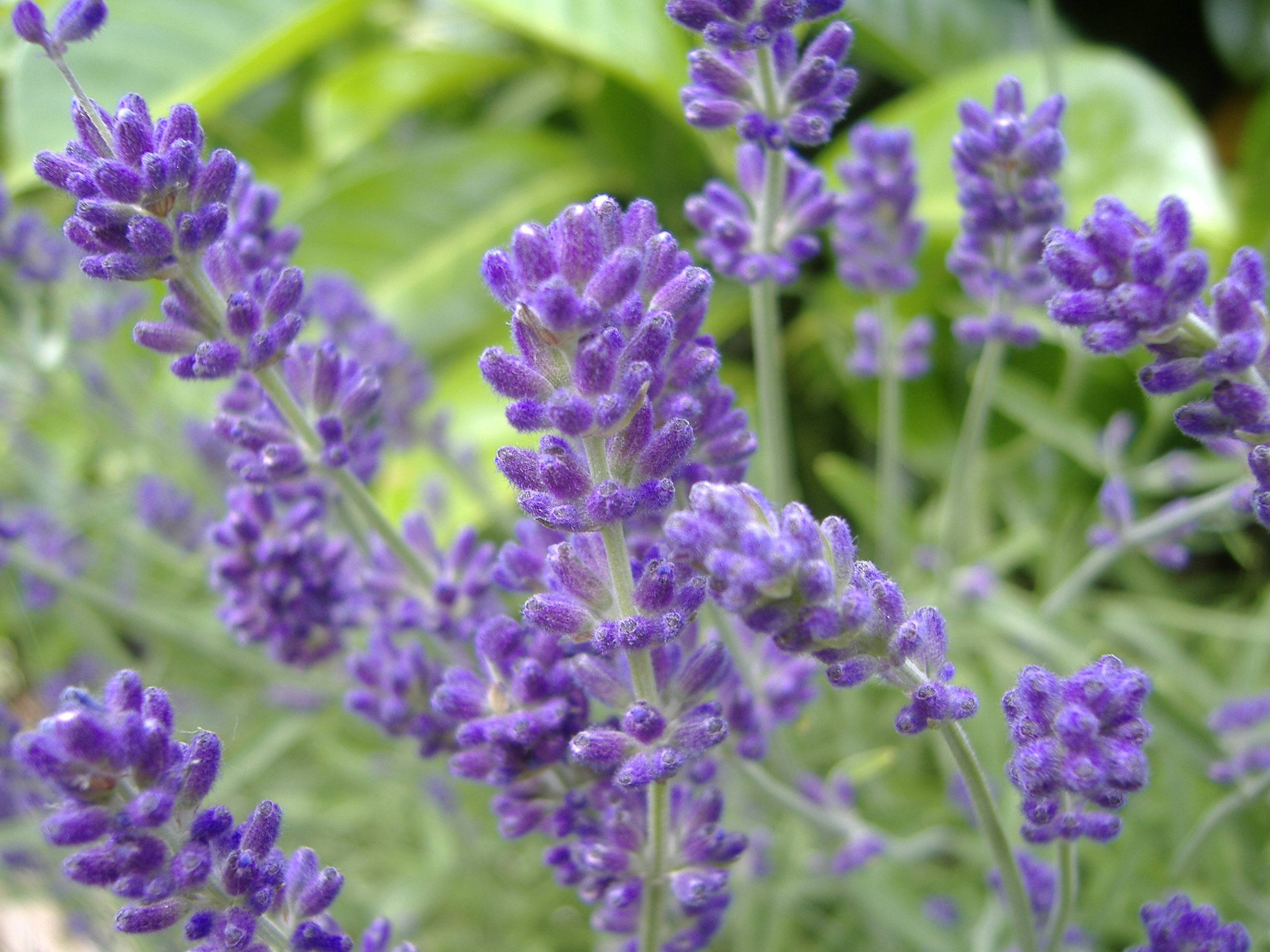
English lavender

The source of this color is the "Pantone Textile Paper eXtended (TPX)" color list, color #17-3617 TPX—English Lavender.

=== Heliotrope ===
Heliotrope

Color coordinates
- Hex triplet: #DF73FF
- sRGB^{B} (r, g, b): (223, 115, 255)
- HSV (h, s, v): (286°, 55%, 100%)
- CIELCh_{uv} (L, C, h): (66, 102, 295°)
- Source: Maerz and Paul
- ISCC–NBS descriptor: Vivid purple
- B: Normalized to [0–255] (byte)

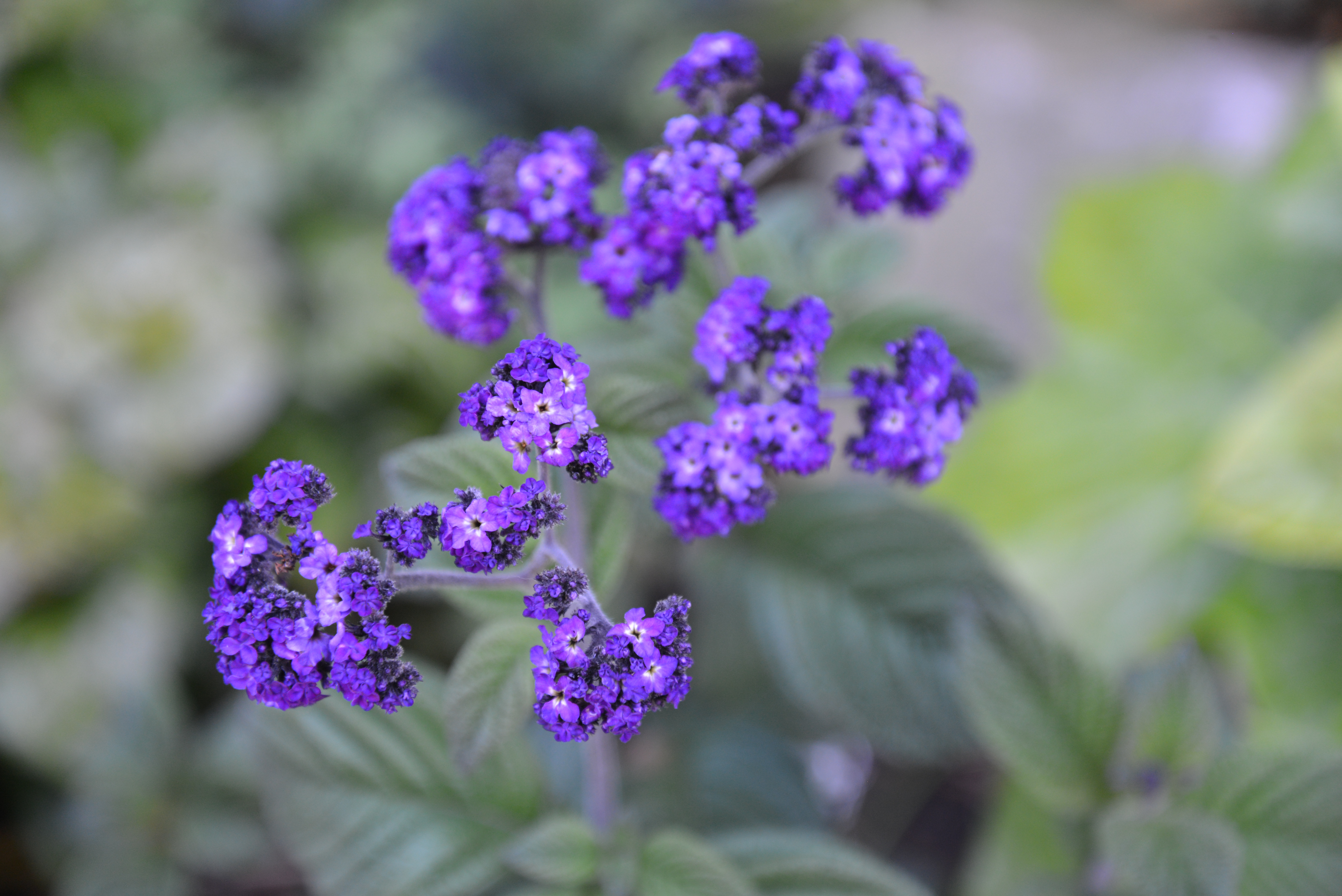
Garden heliotrope

The color heliotrope is shown at right. Another name for this color is psychedelic lavender because this color was a popular color often used in the hippie psychedelic poster art of the late 1960s for the Fillmore Auditorium and the Avalon Ballroom in San Francisco. These posters were sold in the head shops of the Haight-Ashbury neighborhood and were drawn and produced by such artists as Wes Wilson, Stanley Mouse, Rick Griffin, and Victor Moscoso.

=== Languid lavender ===
Languid lavender

Color coordinates
- Hex triplet: #D6CADD
- sRGB^{B} (r, g, b): (214, 202, 221)
- HSV (h, s, v): (278°, 9%, 87%)
- CIELCh_{uv} (L, C, h): (83, 15, 293°)
- Source: Plochere
- ISCC–NBS descriptor: Very pale purple
- B: Normalized to [0–255] (byte)

Displayed at right is the color languid lavender. The source of this color is the Plochere Color System, a color system formulated in 1948 that is widely used by interior designers.

=== Lavender (floral) ===
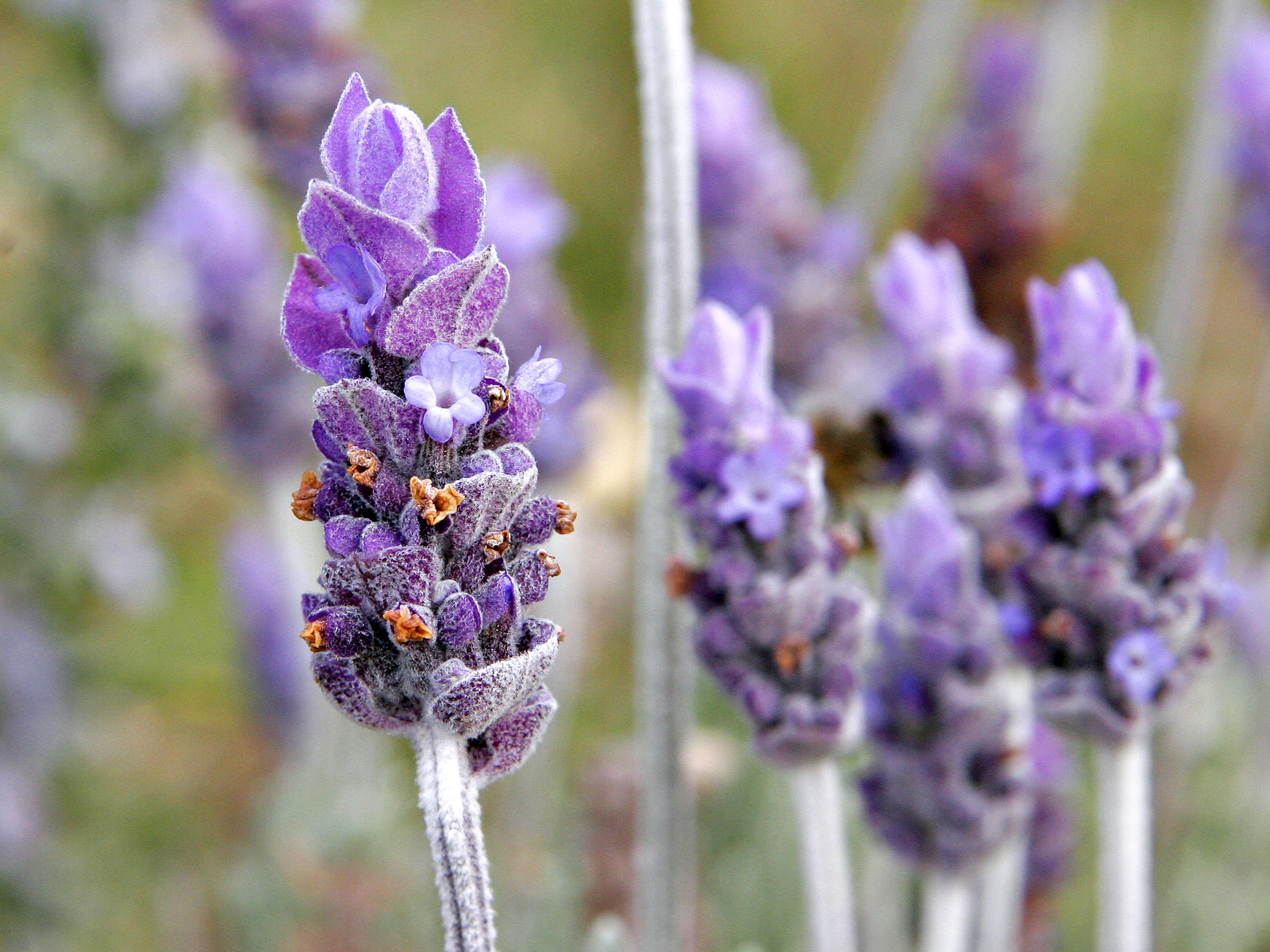
A lavender flower

Lavender (floral)

Color coordinates
- Hex triplet: #B57EDC
- sRGB^{B} (r, g, b): (181, 126, 220)
- HSV (h, s, v): (275°, 43%, 86%)
- CIELCh_{uv} (L, C, h): (62, 71, 287°)
- Source: Maerz and Paul
- ISCC–NBS descriptor: Brilliant purple
- B: Normalized to [0–255] (byte)

At right is displayed the color Lavender (floral). This color matches the color shown as "lavender" (viewed under a full-spectrum fluorescent lamp) in the 1930 book A Dictionary of Color (reference below), the world standard for color names before the introduction of computers. This color may also be called floral lavender. It is a medium violet.

This tone of lavender would be the approximate color resulting from a mix of 50% violet paint and 50% white paint.

This tone of lavender may be regarded as actual lavender and the other tones displayed in this article can be regarded as all variations on this shade.

This lavender also closely matches the color given as lavender in a basic purple color chart.

=== Lavender blue ===
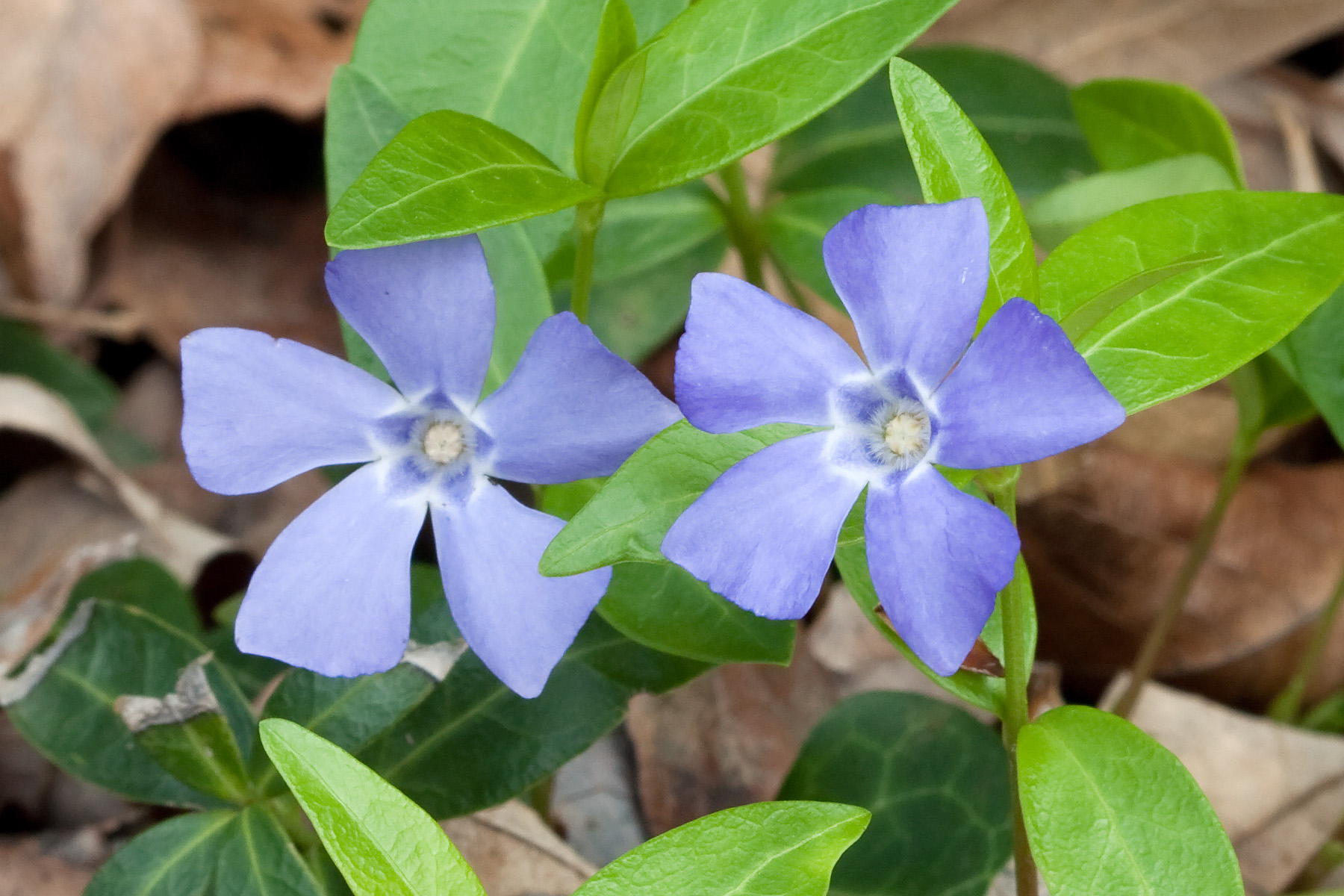
A periwinkle flower

Periwinkle

Color coordinates
- Hex triplet: #CCCCFF
- sRGB^{B} (r, g, b): (204, 204, 255)
- HSV (h, s, v): (240°, 20%, 100%)
- CIELCh_{uv} (L, C, h): (84, 42, 266°)
- Source: Maerz and Paul
- ISCC–NBS descriptor: Very light purplish-blue
- B: Normalized to [0–255] (byte)

Lavender blue was listed in A Dictionary of Color as one of the three major variations of lavender in 1930 along with lavender gray (shown above) and [floral] lavender (shown below). It is identified as being the same color as periwinkle. The first use of the term lavender blue as a color term was in 1926. The color periwinkle was named after the flower of the same name.

=== Lavender blush ===
Lavender blush

Color coordinates
- Hex triplet: #FFF0F5
- sRGB^{B} (r, g, b): (255, 240, 245)
- HSV (h, s, v): (340°, 6%, 100%)
- CIELCh_{uv} (L, C, h): (96, 9, 347°)
- Source: X11
- ISCC–NBS descriptor: Pinkish-white
- B: Normalized to [0–255] (byte)

Displayed at right is the web color lavender blush. It is a pale pinkish tone of lavender.

=== Lavender gray ===
Lavender gray

Color coordinates
- Hex triplet: #C4C3D0
- sRGB^{B} (r, g, b): (196, 195, 208)
- HSV (h, s, v): (245°, 6%, 82%)
- CIELCh_{uv} (L, C, h): (79, 10, 269°)
- Source: ISCC-NBS
- ISCC–NBS descriptor: Light bluish-gray
- B: Normalized to [0–255] (byte)

The historical name for this color is lavender gray. It is listed in A Dictionary of Color as one of the three major variations of lavender in 1930 along with lavender blue (shown below) and [floral] lavender (also shown below). (This book also designates a fourth shade of lavender, called old lavender, also shown below). This color is similar to Prismacolor colored pencil PC 1026, Greyed Lavender.

=== Lavender mist (web color lavender) ===
Lavender mist

Color coordinates
- Hex triplet: #E6E6FA
- sRGB^{B} (r, g, b): (230, 230, 250)
- HSV (h, s, v): (240°, 8%, 98%)
- CIELCh_{uv} (L, C, h): (92, 16, 266°)
- Source: X11
- ISCC–NBS descriptor: Very pale blue
- B: Normalized to [0–255] (byte)

The color designated as the web color lavender is a very pale tint of lavender that in other (artistic) contexts may be described as lavender mist.

=== Lavender pink ===
Lavender pink
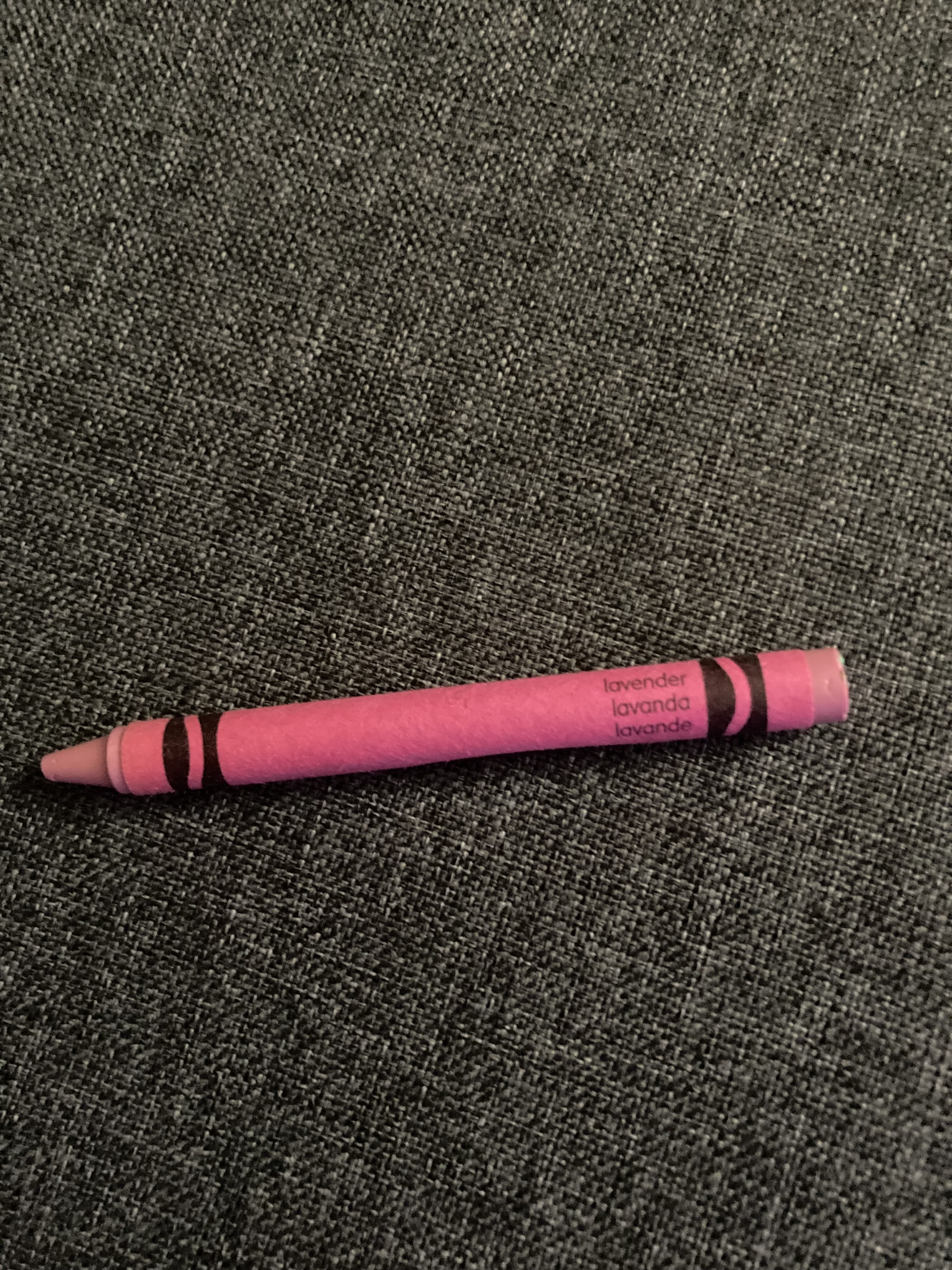
- A lavender Crayola crayon

Color coordinates
- Hex triplet: #FBAED2
- sRGB^{B} (r, g, b): (251, 174, 210)
- HSV (h, s, v): (332°, 31%, 98%)
- CIELCh_{uv} (L, C, h): (79, 48, 340°)
- Source: Crayola
- ISCC–NBS descriptor: Light purplish-pink
- B: Normalized to [0–255] (byte)

After the introduction of the Munsell color system, in which purple, described as equivalent to red-violet, is described as one of the five psychological primary colors along with red, yellow, green, and blue, some people began to think of lavender as being somewhat more pinkish color.

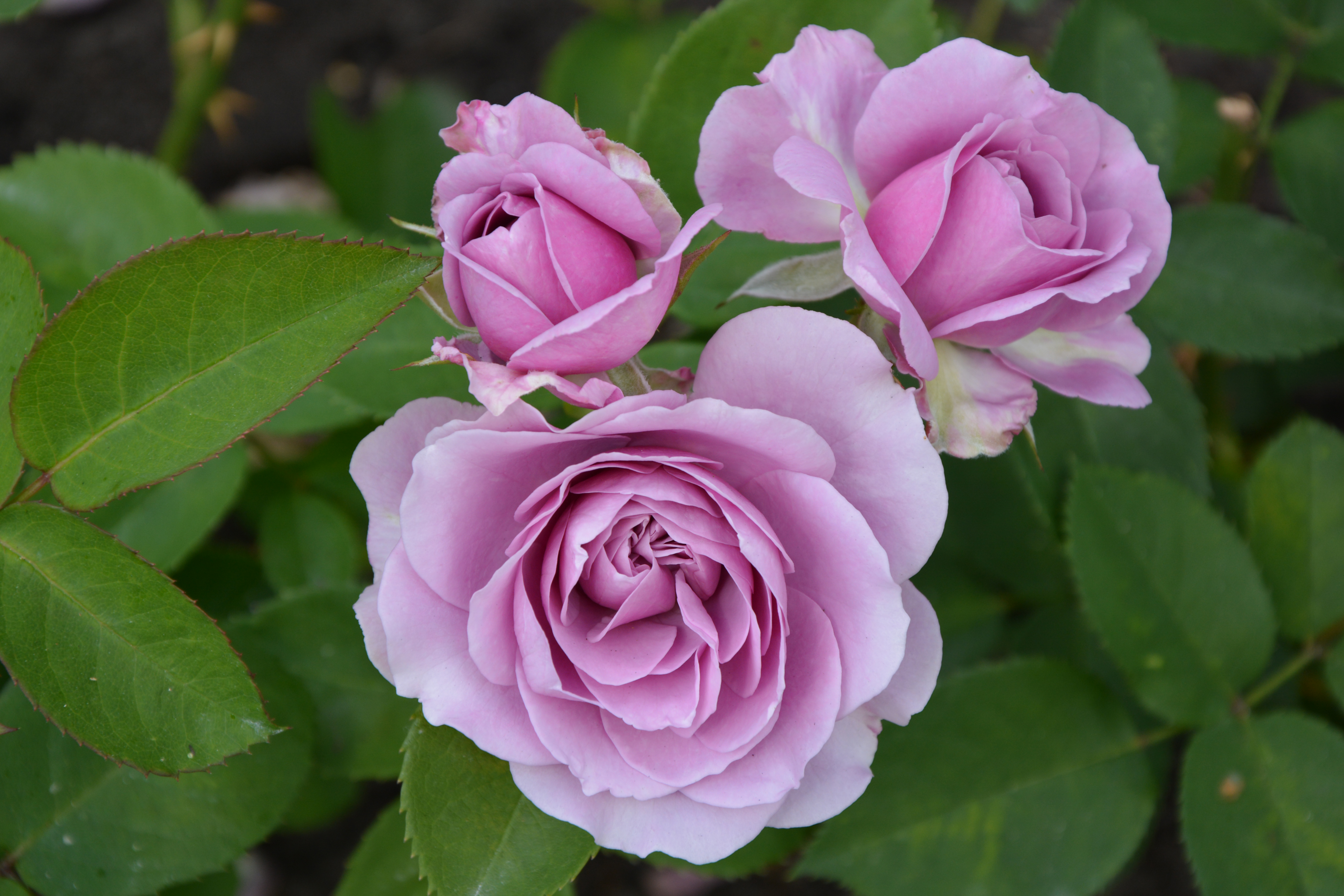
Lavender pink roses

This color can be described as lavender pink or pale pinkish-purple when purple is defined as equivalent to red-violet as artists do.

This tone of lavender, displayed at right, is the color designated as lavender (color #74) in the list of Crayola crayon colors. This version of "lavender" is a lot pinker than the other shades of lavender shown here.

=== Lavender purple (purple mountain majesty) ===
Purple mountain majesty

Color coordinates
- Hex triplet: #9678B6
- sRGB^{B} (r, g, b): (150, 120, 182)
- HSV (h, s, v): (269°, 34%, 71%)
- CIELCh_{uv} (L, C, h): (55, 48, 284°)
- Source: Crayola
- ISCC–NBS descriptor: Light violet
- B: Normalized to [0–255] (byte)

Displayed at right is the color purple mountain majesty, a Crayola color since 1993. This color may be regarded as a medium lavender gray.

This color was the color called lavender in Crayola crayons before 1958, when Crayola switched to calling the color shown above as lavender pink as being lavender. See the website "Lost Crayola Crayon Colors". Because of that, another name for this color is lavender purple.

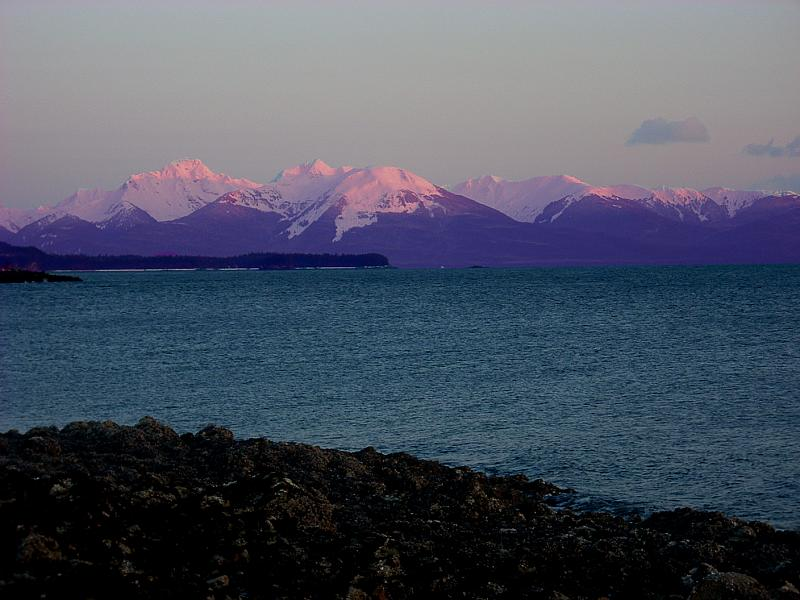
Mountain view at Auke Bay, Alaska, showing distinctive purple tinges

This color is a representation of the way mountains look when they are far away.

=== Medium lavender magenta (web color plum) ===
Plum (web color)

Color coordinates
- Hex triplet: #DDA0DD
- sRGB^{B} (r, g, b): (221, 160, 221)
- HSV (h, s, v): (300°, 28%, 87%)
- CIELCh_{uv} (L, C, h): (73, 50, 308°)
- Source: HTML/CSS
- ISCC–NBS descriptor: Light reddish-purple
- B: Normalized to [0–255] (byte)

At right is displayed the color medium lavender magenta which is equivalent to the web color version of plum (pale plum).

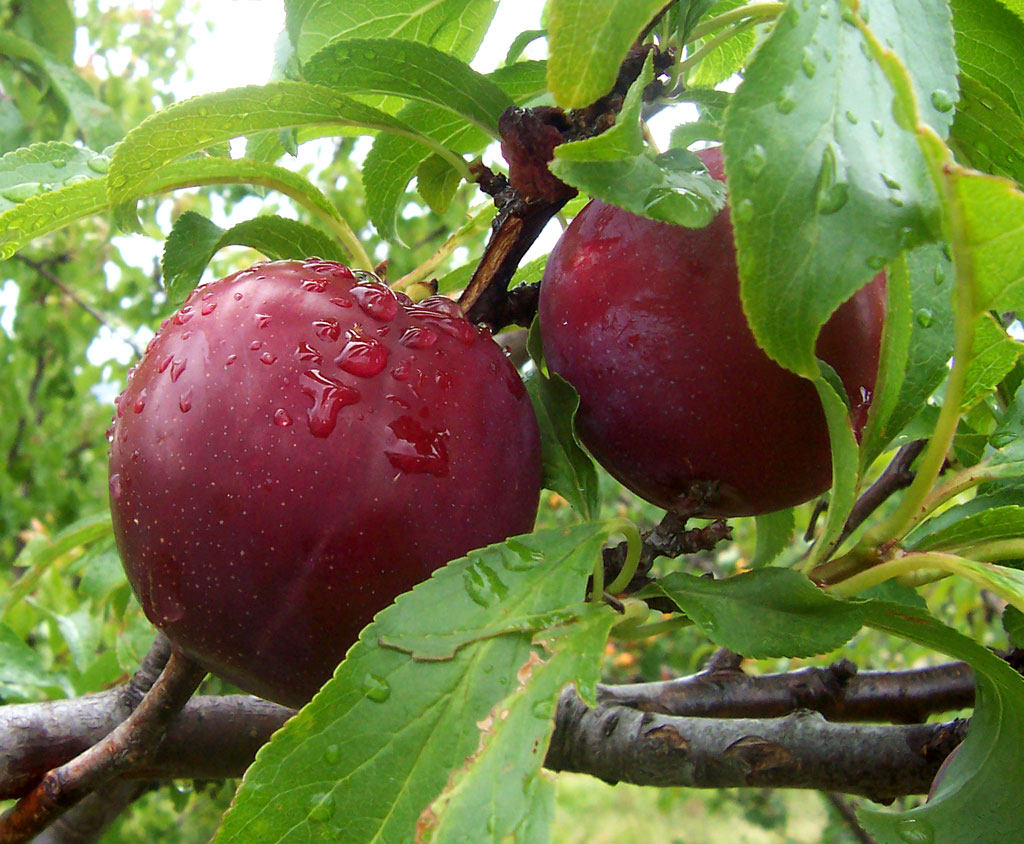
Plum fruits

This color may be regarded both as a tone of lavender since it is a light color between rose and blue and as a light medium tone of magenta because its red and blue values are equal (the color signature of a tone of magenta for computer display).

=== Old lavender ===
Old lavender

Color coordinates
- Hex triplet: #796878
- sRGB^{B} (r, g, b): (121, 104, 120)
- HSV (h, s, v): (304°, 14%, 47%)
- CIELCh_{uv} (L, C, h): (46, 13, 310°)
- Source: ISCC-NBS
- ISCC–NBS descriptor: Grayish-purple
- B: Normalized to [0–255] (byte)

The dark lavender gray color displayed at right is called old lavender. It is a dark grayish-violet.

The first recorded use of old lavender as a color name in English was in the year 1924.

=== Pale lavender ===
Pale Lavender

Color coordinates
- Hex triplet: #DCD0FF
- sRGB^{B} (r, g, b): (220, 208, 255)
- HSV (h, s, v): (255°, 18%, 100%)
- CIELCh_{uv} (L, C, h): (86, 37, 276°)
- Source: ISCC-NBS
- ISCC–NBS descriptor: Very light violet
- B: Normalized to [0–255] (byte)

At right is displayed the pale tint of lavender shown as lavender in sample 209 in the ISCC-NBS Dictionary of Color Names.

=== Pink lavender ===
Pink lavender

Color coordinates
- Hex triplet: #DBB2D1
- sRGB^{B} (r, g, b): (219, 178, 209)
- HSV (h, s, v): (315°, 19%, 86%)
- CIELCh_{uv} (L, C, h): (77, 29, 319°)
- Source: Pantone TPX
- ISCC–NBS descriptor: Grayish purplish pink
- B: Normalized to [0–255] (byte)

The color pink lavender is displayed at right.

The source of this color is the "Pantone Textile Paper eXtended (TPX)" color list, color #14-3207 TPX—Pink Lavender.

=== Soap ===
Soap

Color coordinates
- Hex triplet: #CEC8EF
- sRGB^{B} (r, g, b): (206, 200, 239)
- HSV (h, s, v): (249°, 16%, 94%)
- CIELCh_{uv} (L, C, h): (82, 31, 272°)
- Source: Crayola
- ISCC–NBS descriptor: Very pale violet
- B: Normalized to [0–255] (byte)

The color soap is displayed at right. Soap is a color formulated by Crayola in 1994 as one of the colors in its Magic Scent specialty box of colors.

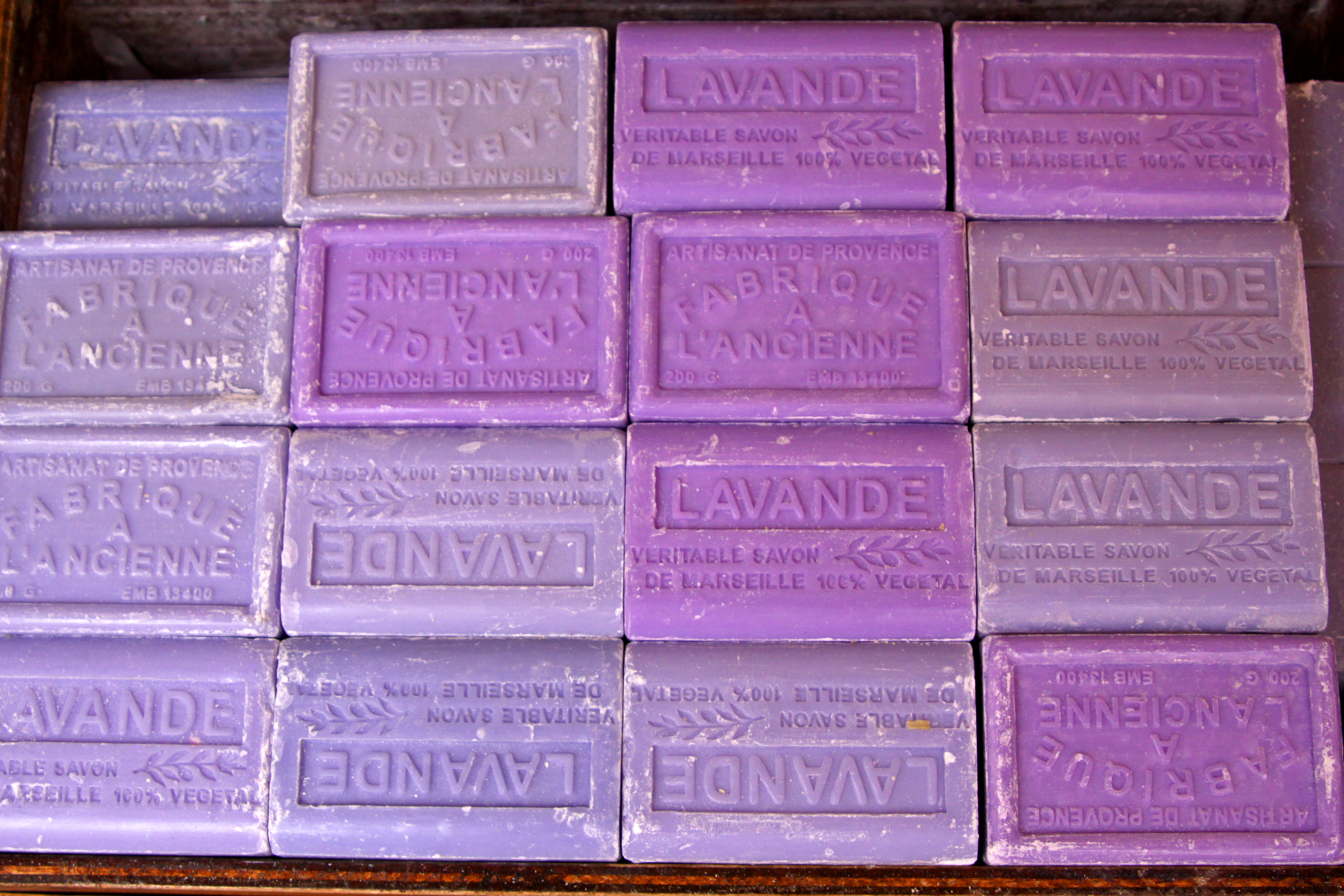
Soap bars with lavender from Provence

This color is a representation of soap scented with lavender, one of the most popular scents for soap.

=== Twilight lavender ===
Twilight lavender

Color coordinates
- Hex triplet: #8A496B
- sRGB^{B} (r, g, b): (138, 73, 107)
- HSV (h, s, v): (329°, 47%, 54%)
- CIELCh_{uv} (L, C, h): (40, 40, 339°)
- Source: Crayola
- ISCC–NBS descriptor: Dark purplish-red
- B: Normalized to [0–255] (byte)

The color twilight lavender is displayed at right. Twilight lavender is a color formulated by Crayola in 1990 as one of the colors in its Silver Swirls specialty box of metallic colors.

Although this is supposed to be a metallic color, there is no mechanism for displaying metallic colors on a computer.

=== Wisteria ===
Wisteria

Color coordinates
- Hex triplet: #C9A0DC
- sRGB^{B} (r, g, b): (201, 160, 220)
- HSV (h, s, v): (281°, 27%, 86%)
- CIELCh_{uv} (L, C, h): (71, 47, 293°)
- Source: Crayola
- ISCC–NBS descriptor: Light purple
- B: Normalized to [0–255] (byte)

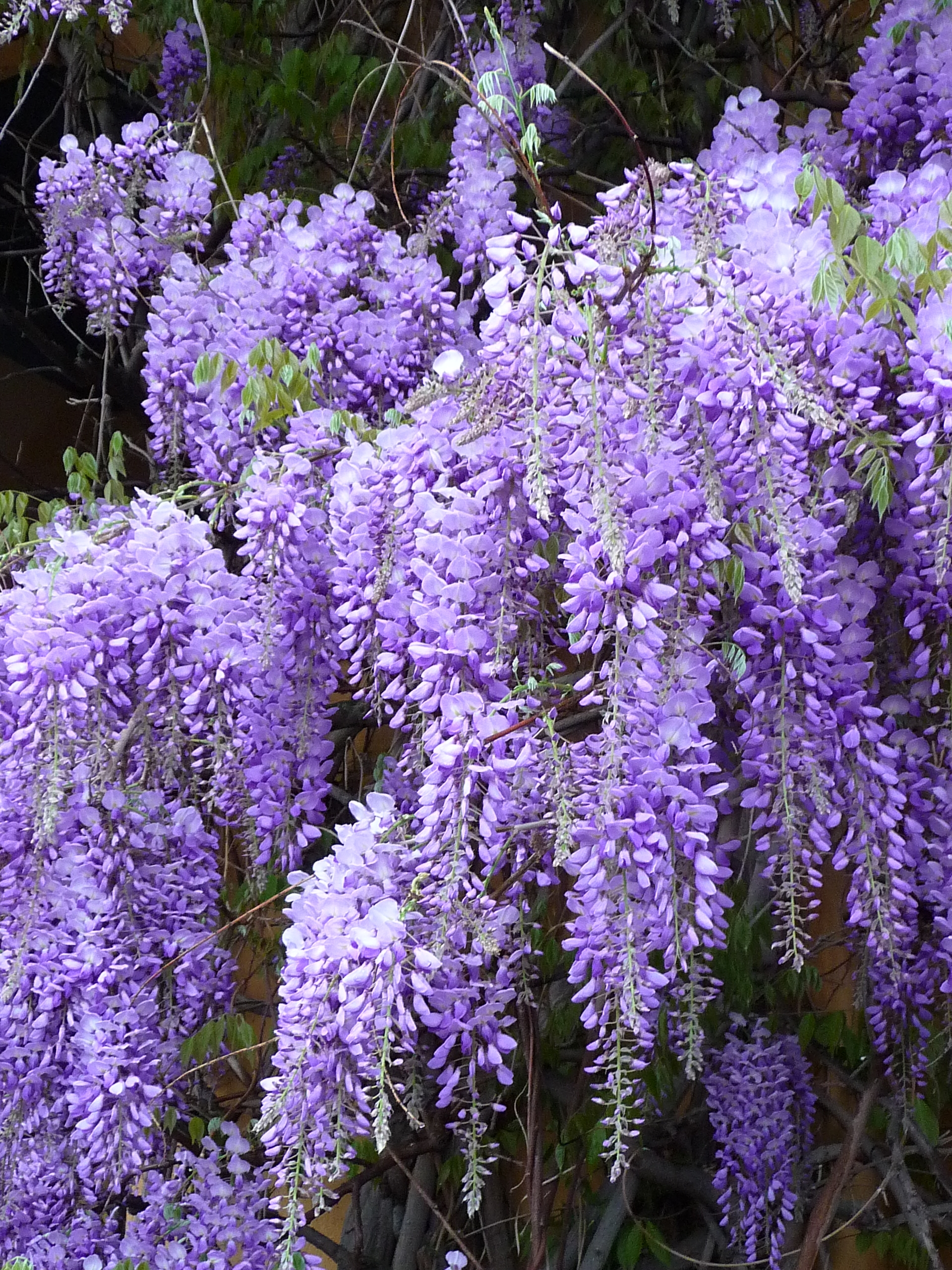
Chinese wisteria

The color wisteria is displayed at right. Wisteria, a light medium violet color is equivalent to light lavender.

The Prismacolor colored pencil PC 956, which used to be called light violet and is now called lilac (the actual color of the colored pencil is equivalent to wisteria rather than lilac) is this color.

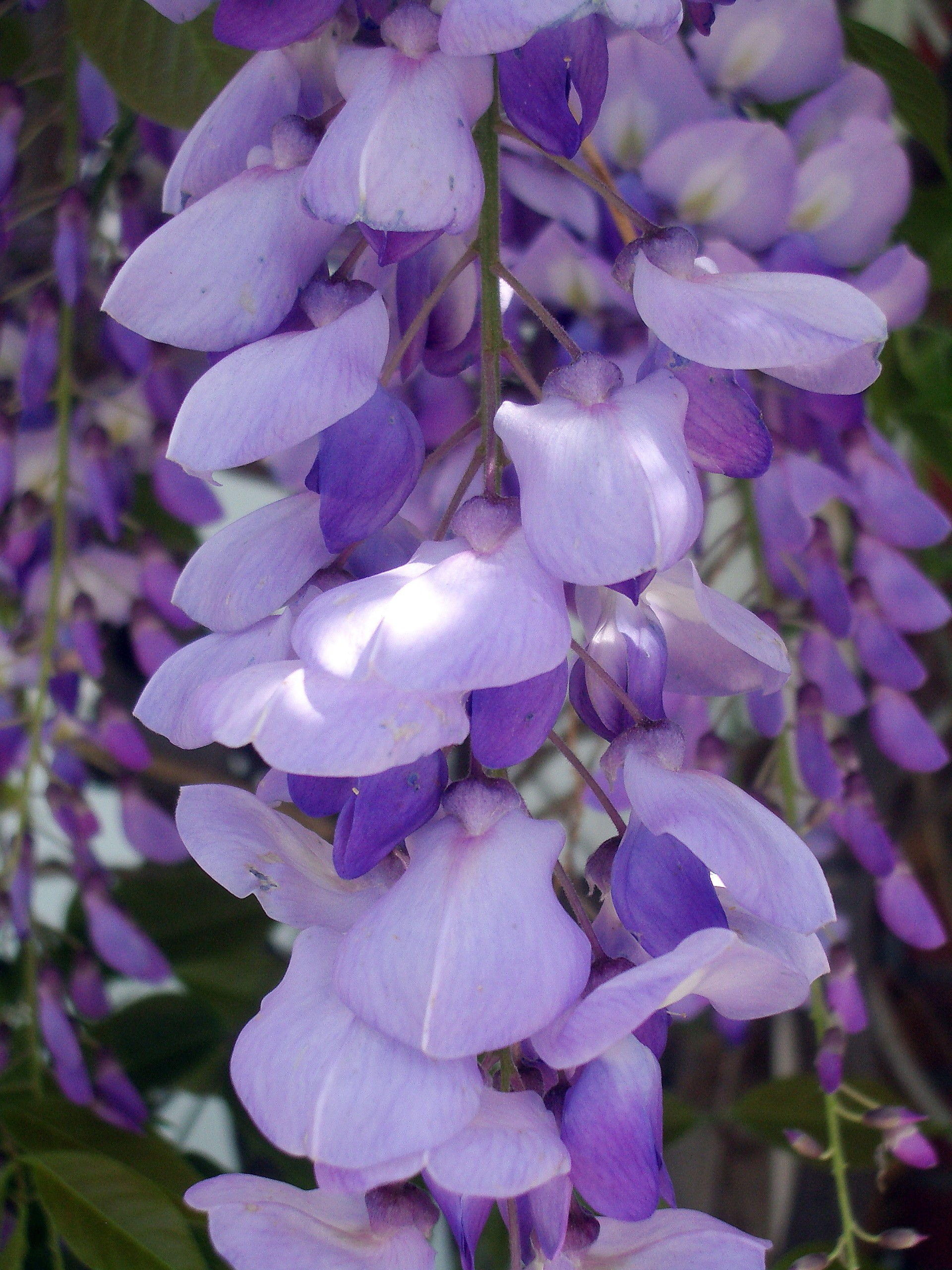
Wisteria close-up

Wisteria in this exact shade is one of the Crayola crayon colors on the list of Crayola crayon colors. It was formulated as a Crayola color in 1993. The first recorded use of wisteria as a color name in English was in 1892.

== In culture ==
=== Fashion ===
- In the formal rules of mourning dress in Georgian, Victorian, and Edwardian Britain, lavender was one of the few colors generally considered acceptable for women's clothing during the period of half-mourning, during which the bereaved was considered to still be in mourning and required to dress in sober, muted tones, but was not expected to wear the all-black garments of full mourning.
- Lavender roses are symbolic of "love at first sight".
- In 1995 actress Uma Thurman wore a notable lavender colored dress by Prada to the Academy Award ceremonies, where she was nominated for Best Supporting Actress.

=== LGBTQ ===
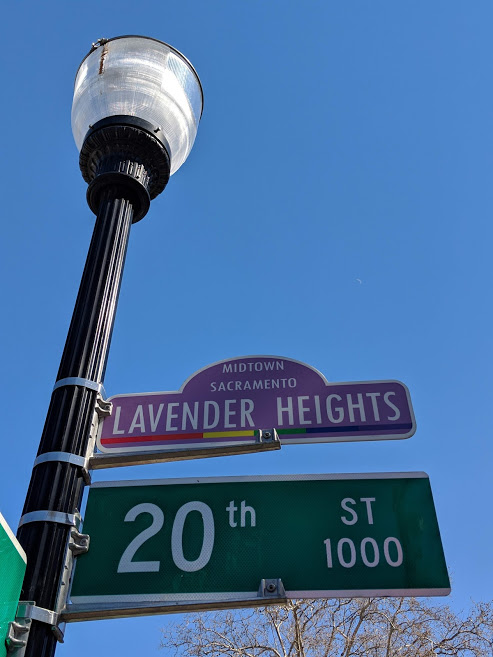
Lavender Heights in Sacramento, California

- Lavender is a color that can represent the LGBTQ community.
- Just as in the 1890s mauve symbolized homosexuality, the tone of lavender described above as [true] lavender or floral lavender became the symbol of homosexuality in the 1950s and 1960s. The gay anthem Das lila Lied was released in 1920 with the line "we only love lavender night...". In 1923, Harold Hersey wrote a tongue-in-cheek poem called "The Lavender Cowboy" about an unmanly cowboy with "only two hairs on his chest". Seán O'Casey wrote in 1928, "I am very sorry... that I have hurt the refined sentimentalities of C. W. Allen by neglecting to use the lavender... language of the 18th and 19th centuries." Cole Porter's 1929 song "I'm a Gigolo" went: "I'm a famous gigolo, And of lavender, my nature's got just a dash in it." A 1935 dictionary of slang reported "streak of lavender," meant an effeminate man or a sissy, a term used in 1926 by Carl Sandburg to describe young Abraham Lincoln. In the 1960s, homophiles were sometimes referred to as the lavender boys (this term is still used by some people (both gay and non-gay) to refer to gays). A lavender convention is a convention of homosexuals. A heterosexual who has some homosexual tendencies is described as someone with a dash of lavender. In the 1970s pink became more often associated with homosexuality because of the use of the pink triangle as a symbol of gay liberation. However, gays of the baby boom generation still think of lavender as the gayest color. According to some sources, the reason lavender symbolizes homosexuality is because it is the color that is obtained when pink (the color symbolizing girls) is mixed with baby blue (the color symbolizing boys).
- Lavender roses are sometimes given by LGBT people to each other on Valentine's Day or may be given to those entering into a same-sex marriage.
- A lavender marriage is a marriage between a man and a woman in which one, or both, parties are, or are assumed to be, homosexual. Usually, but not always, both parties are assumed to be complicit in a public deception to hide their homosexuality (although in some lavender marriages, the marriage partners may be bisexual).
- In the bandana code of the gay leather subculture, wearing a lavender bandana symbolizes that the wearer has a fetish for dressing in drag.
- Lavender is the name of an LGBT magazine in Minnesota.
- The Lavender Dragon Society was a club for gay Asian Americans in the San Francisco Bay Area in the late 1990s and early 2000s.
- The Lavender Families Resource Network, formerly known as the Mothers' National Defense Fund, was a Seattle-based organization started in 1974 with the aim to provide lesbian and bisexual women with resources and information relating to child-rearing, custody and adoption issues, and donor insemination.
- Lavender Graduation is an event that occurs annually at many colleges and universities where LGBT students get their own graduation ceremony to celebrate their identities and achievements.
- The study of language used specifically by LGBT speakers is known as lavender linguistics.
- The LGBTQIA caucus of the Green Party of the United States is the Lavender Greens.
- The lavender scare refers to the fear and persecution of homosexuals in the 1950s in the United States, which paralleled the anti-communist campaign known as McCarthyism.
- Lavender is the name of a 2019 American short LGBT romantic drama film directed by Matthew Puccini.
- A synonym used for the original gay liberation movement which began in 1969 is referring to the movement as the lavender revolution.
- During the 1960s feminism movement, lesbians were rejected by the then head of the National Organization for Women, Betty Friedan, calling them the "Lavender Menace". These lesbian radical feminists adopted the name for their own informal group, consisting of many members of the Gay Liberation Front.
- The Lavender Panthers was a gay rights activist group in San Francisco during the early 1970s, led by the Reverend Ray Broshears.
- Lavender Country was an American country music band whose 1973 self-titled album was made up entirely of gay-themed songs.

=== Music ===
- "Lavender Blue", originally an English folk song dating to the 17th century. This song became very popular during the 1950s rock and roll era, when it was sung by Solomon Burke. A hit version of the song, sung by Burl Ives, was featured in the Walt Disney movie So Dear to My Heart and the 2015 film Cinderella.
- "Lavender" is a song by Marillion on the 1985 album Misplaced Childhood. It quotes the folk song "Lavender Blue" in its lyrics.
- "Lavender" is a song by October Noir on the 2019 album Thirteen.
- "Lavender Haze" is a song by Taylor Swift on the 2022 album Midnights.

=== Religion ===
- In Theosophy and the Ascended Master Teachings (a group of religions based on Theosophy), since the color violet represents the deity St. Germain, and lavender is simply a light tone of violet, lavender as well as violet objects may be placed on the altar to St. Germain.
- The Christian holiday of Easter is represented by lavender and yellow because the crocus flower, which is lavender and yellow, blooms in Europe in the spring.

=== Film, television and video games ===
- Ladies in Lavender is a 2004 film by Charles Dance.
- Lavender Town is a purple-tinted town in the Kanto region in the Pokémon video games. It is well known for being a graveyard for Pokémon, and the many ghosts that haunt it.
- In My Little Pony: Friendship Is Magic, Lavender is the color of Twilight Sparkle's coat.

=== Numismatics ===
The Reserve Bank of India (RBI) issued a lavender colored banknote of ₹100 denomination under Mahatma Gandhi New Series. The bank note measures 142 mm × 66 mm.

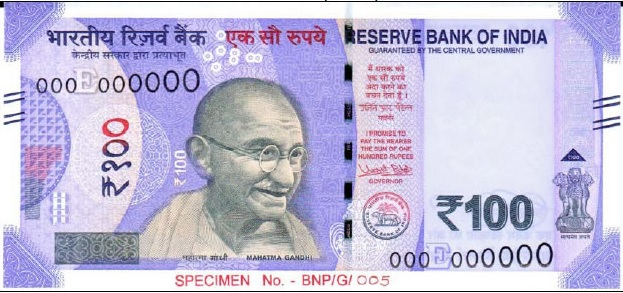
Indian 100 rupee note, obverse

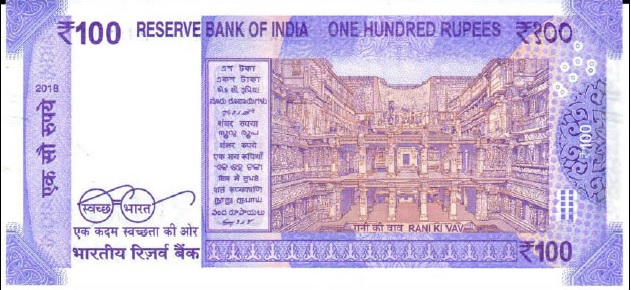
Indian 100 rupee note, reverse

== Gallery ==
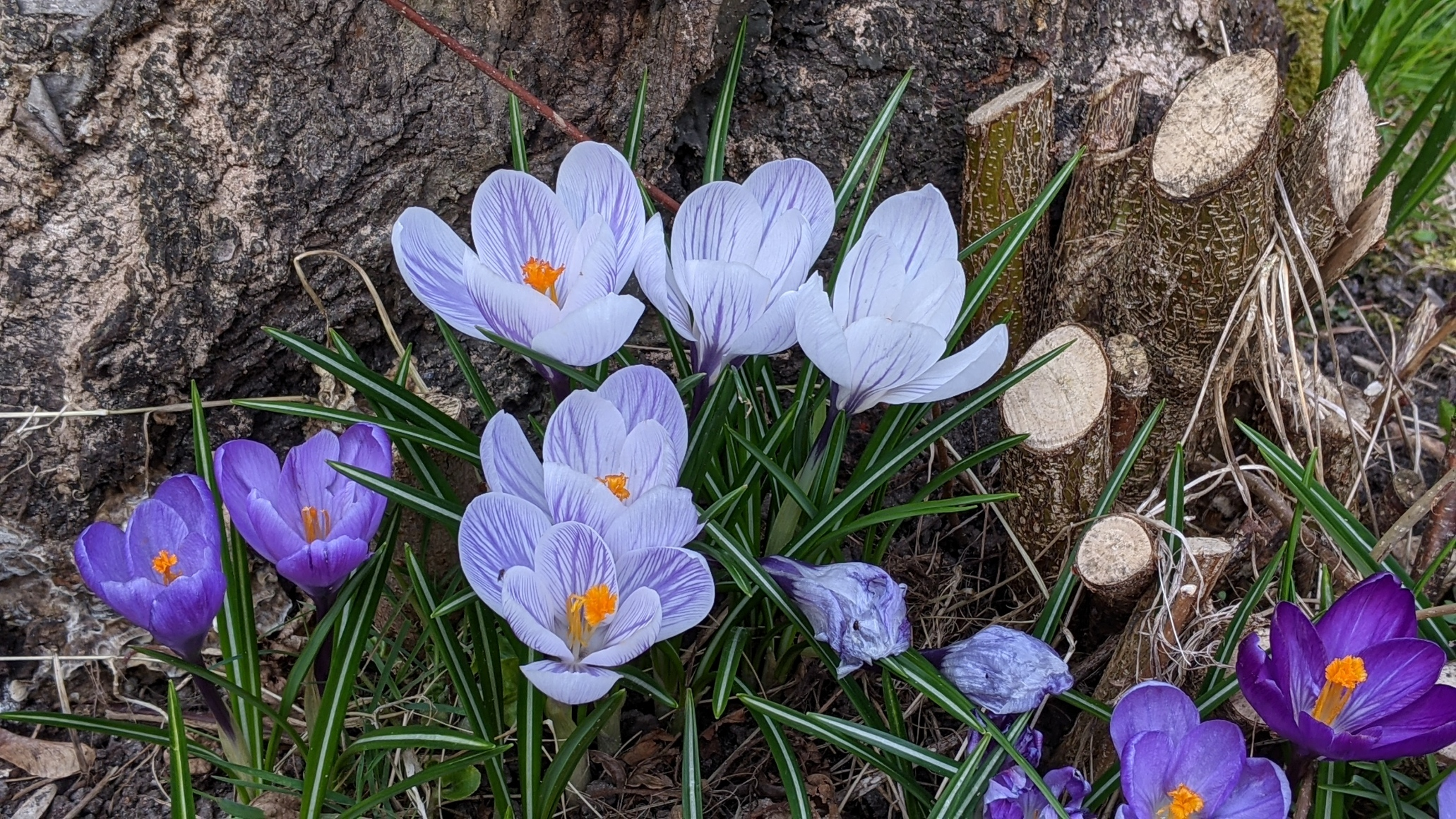
Some crocuses are lavender-colored

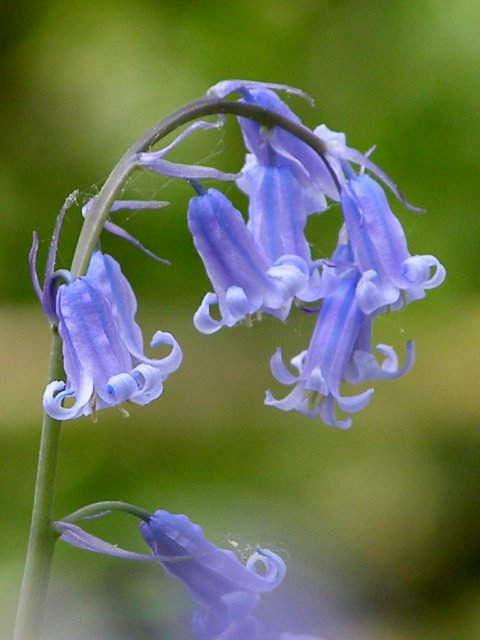
Hyacinthoides (blue bell) is lavender blue

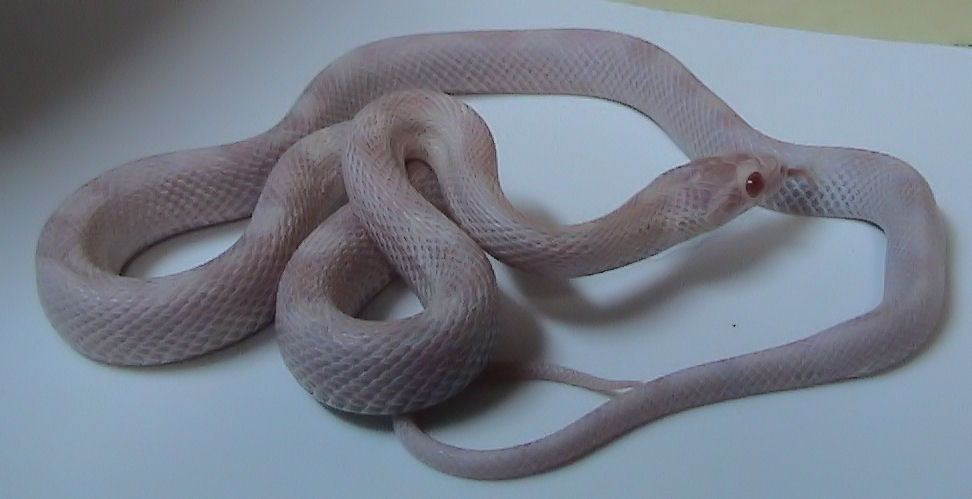
"Opal" phase Corn snake (Pantherophis guttatus)

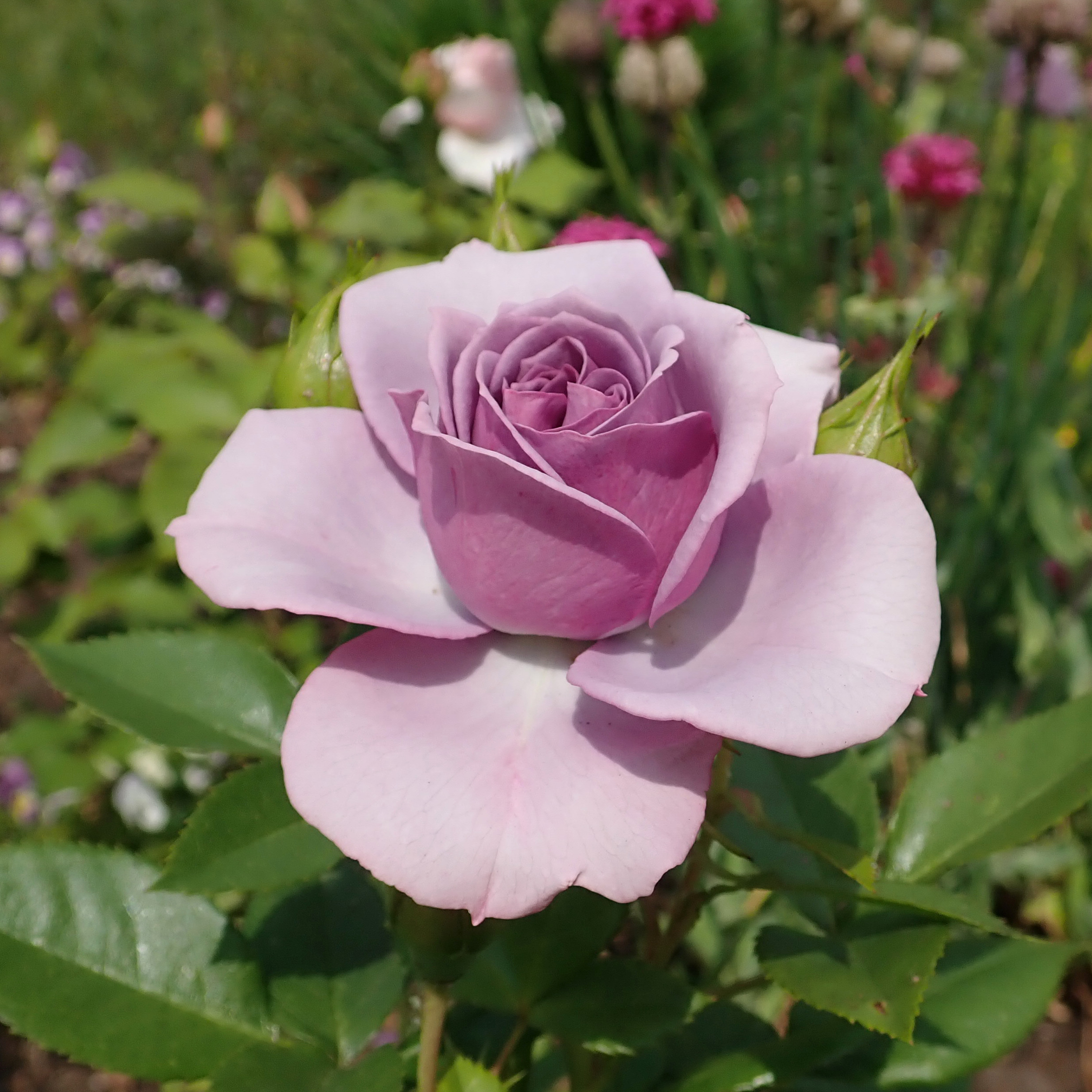
Rose called "lavender flower circus"

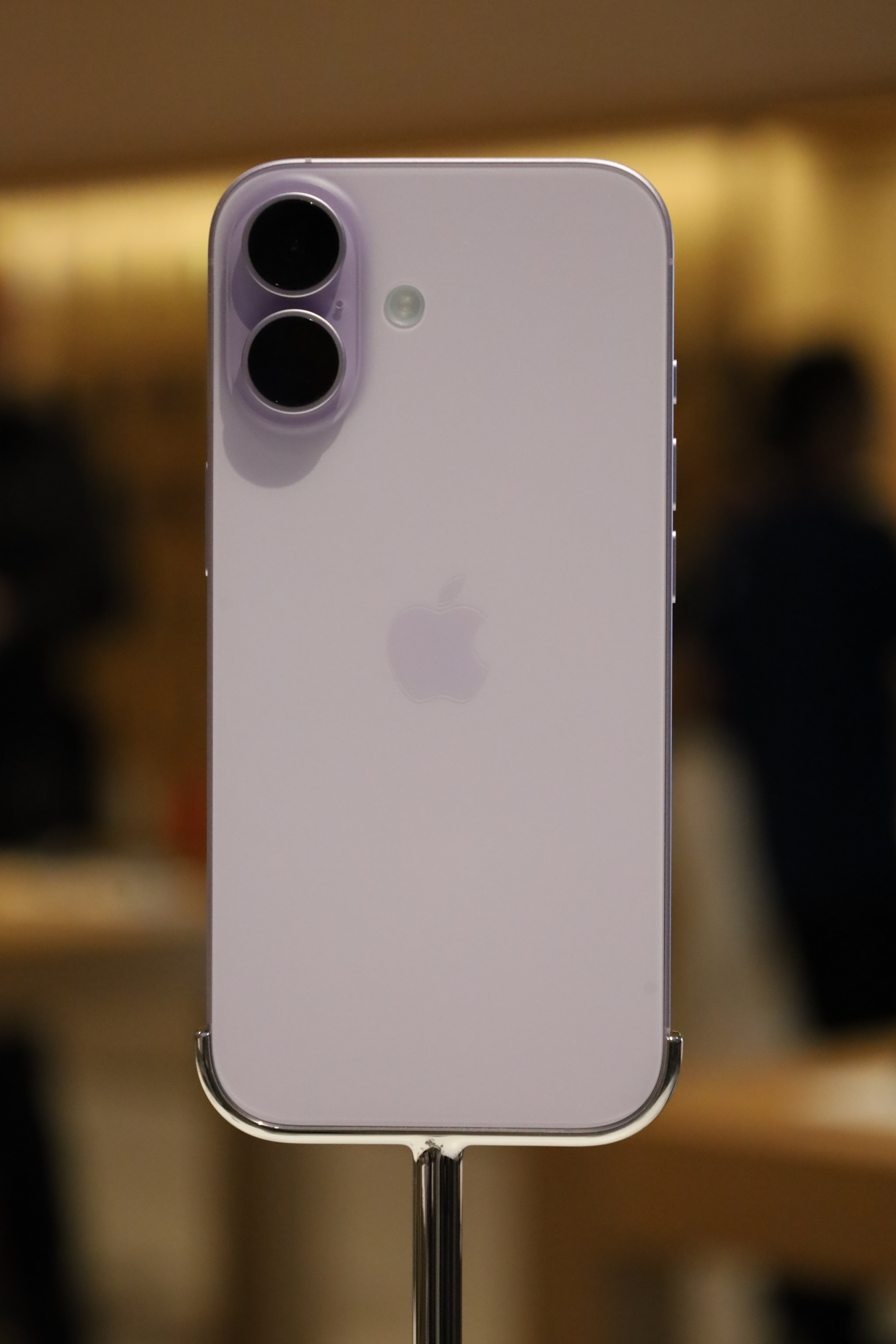
Lavender iPhone 17

== See also ==
- LGBT symbols
- Lilac
- List of colors
- Mauve
