= 1975 All-South Independent football team =

American college football season

The 1975 All-South Independent football team consists of American football players chosen by various selectors as the best players at each position among the southern independent colleges and universities during the 1975 NCAA Division I football season.

== Offense ==
Quarterback

- Jack Grantz, South Carolina (AP-1)
- Clyde Walker, Florida State (AP-2)

Running backs

- Kevin Long, South Carolina (AP-1)
- Roscoe Coles, Virginia Tech (AP-1)
- Clarence Williams, South Carolina (AP-2)
- Terdell Middleton, Memphis (AP-2)

Wide receivers

- John "Fuzzy" Filliez, Marshall (AP-1)
- Phillip Logan, South Carolina (AP-2)
- Mike Shumann, Florida State (AP-2)

Tight end

- Steve Raible, Georgia Tech (AP-1)
- Darwin Willie, Tulane (AP-2)

Tackles

- Róndal Davis, Virginia Tech (AP-1)
- Jerry Fremin, Southern Mississippi (AP-1)
- Jerome Provence, South Carolina (AP-2)
- Eric Smith, Southern Mississippi (AP-2)

Guards

- Jeff Gardner, Florida State (AP-1)
- Mark Hunter, Georgia Tech (AP-1)
- Bert Camut, Miami (AP-2)
- Steve Corson, South Carolina (AP-2)

Center

- Leo Tierney, Georgia Tech (AP-1)
- Bob Rush, Memphis (AP-2)

== Defense ==
Defensive ends

- Bryan Alexander, Tulane (AP-1)
- Steadman Scavella, Miami (AP-1)
- Russ Manzari, South Carolina (AP-2)
- Lummy Wright, Memphis (AP-2)
- Bobby Smithhart, South Carolina (AP-2)

Defensive tackles

- Gary Dunn, Miami (AP-1)
- Rick Gibney, Georgia Tech (AP-1)
- Randy Latta, Southern Mississippi (AP-1)
- Tom Beasley, Virginia Tech (AP-2)
- Mark Olivari, Tulane (AP-2)
- Willie Jones, Florida State (AP-2)

Linebackers

- Lucius Sanford, Georgia (AP-1)
- Jim Gueno, Tulane (AP-1)
- Glenn Fleming, Louisiana-Monroe (AP-1)
- Jerry Dandridge, Memphis (AP-1)
- Rick Razzano, (AP-2)
- Ron Cheatham, Southern Mississippi (AP-2)
- Aaron Carter, Florida State (AP-2)

Defensive backs

- Billy Hardee, Virginia Tech (AP-1)
- Norris Thomas, Southern Mississippi (AP-1)
- Bobby Jackson, Florida State (AP-1)
- Henry Laws, South Carolina (AP-2)
- Wyatt Washington, Tulane (AP-2)
- Lee Nelson, Florida State (AP-2)

== Special teams ==
Kicker

- Chris Dennis, Miami (AP-1)

Punter

- Wilbur Summers, Louisville (AP-1)
