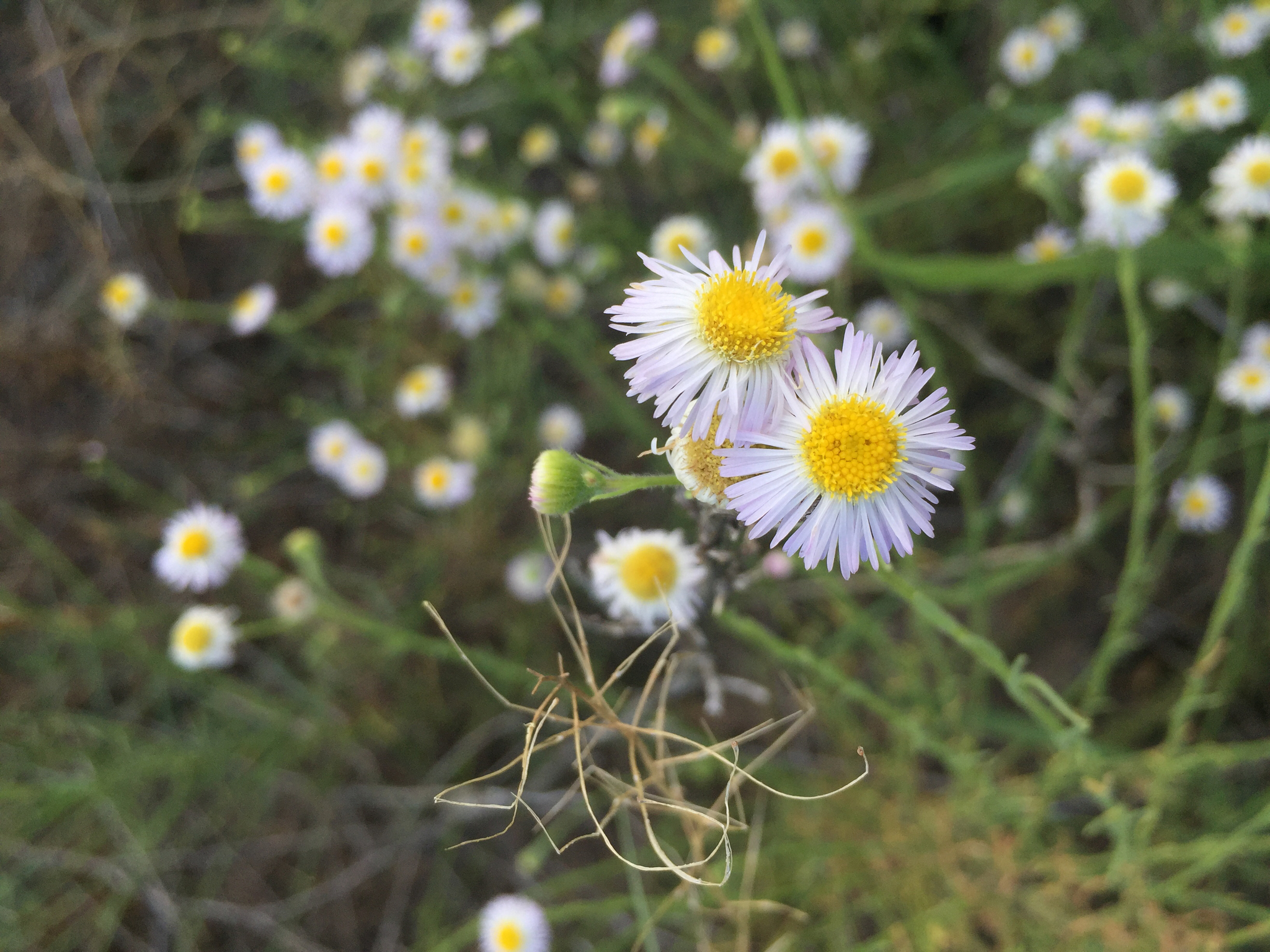
- In Arizona

Conservation status
- Imperiled (NatureServe)

Scientific classification
- Kingdom: Plantae
- Clade: Tracheophytes
- Clade: Angiosperms
- Clade: Eudicots
- Clade: Asterids
- Order: Asterales
- Family: Asteraceae
- Genus: Erigeron
- Species: E. arisolius

Binomial name
- Erigeron arisolius G.L.Nesom

= Erigeron arisolius =

Species of flowering plant

Erigeron arisolius is a species of flowering plant in the family Asteraceae known by the common names arid throne fleabane and dry-sun fleabane. It is native to the southwestern United States (Arizona) and northwestern Mexico (Sonora).

Erigeron arisolius is an annual or perennial herb up to 70 cm (26 inches) tall, with a thick taproot. Leaves are spatula-shaped near the bottom of the plant, thread-like higher on the stem. One plant can produce as many as 50 small flower heads at the ends of long, spindly branches, each head containing 125–180 white, pink, or lavender ray florets and many small yellow disc florets.
