= Miami Norland Senior High School =

Location
- 1193 NW 193rd St; Miami Gardens, Florida; United States; 25.9520372°N 80.2192147°W

Information
- Type: Public high school
- Established: 1958
- School district: Miami-Dade County Public Schools
- Principal: Rhonda Gaines-Miller
- Teaching staff: 74.00 (FTE)
- Grades: 9–12
- Enrollment: 1,608 (2023–2024)
- Campus: Suburban
- Colors: Maroon and gray
- Athletics: FHSAA
- Nickname: Vikings
- Yearbook: Valhalla
- Website: miaminorlandshs.org

Miami Norland Senior High School is a public high school in the Norland neighborhood of Miami Gardens, Florida. It opened in 1958 and was segregated, serving only white students until 1962. Its student body is approximately 95 percent African American. Its teams have been very successful, winning state championships in various sports. The school is 1 of 139 schools in Miami-Dade County Public Schools.

== History ==
Miami Norland Senior High School opened its doors to students in 1958 as an all-white school, accepting fifty students between grades seven through twelve. Nearby Miami Palmetto Senior High School was established at the same time and is considered a sister school. Miami Norland had a cost of $1,699,000. The expected enrollment was 2,250. Once Norland Junior High School opened across the street, grades 7-9 moved there. Miami Norland continued to have three grade levels (10th, 11th and 12th) until 1985, when grade 9 was added.

The first principal of Miami Norland, Foster Hunter, guided the school from its inception into the mid-1970s. For more than a decade, it was an all-white school; this changed in 1969, when all schools in Dade County were court-ordered to desegregate.

The original buildings of Miami Norland were demolished during the summer of 2016, after a new, more modern facility was built to replace the old facility. Prior to the teardown, the school hosted a walk-through for alumni to take a last look at the old building. The new building opened for classes on August 22, 2016, at the beginning of the 2016–17 school year. This new building was the last new facility for the northern Miami-Dade County high schools.

The school now offers an Academy of Fine Arts, Hospitality and Tourism and Teaching magnet programs.

Prior to the opening of North Miami Beach High School and Dr. Michael Krop High School, students from North Miami Beach were assigned to North Miami High School and Miami Norland High School.

It was in the Norland census-designated place, in an unincorporated area until Miami Gardens incorporated as a city on May 13, 2003.

Students are required to wear school uniform shirts in maroon, white or gray. They may wear solid maroon, gray, khaki, or black pants or shorts.

== Demographics ==
Miami Norland is 95% Black, 4% Hispanic and 1% non-white Hispanic.

== Athletics ==
Home of the Vikings, Miami Norland athletic teams wear the colors of maroon and gray, and compete within the Florida High School Athletic Association (FHSAA). The school offers a select few sports, including basketball, cross country, soccer, track and field, and volleyball. Boys-only sports are football and wrestling, while the lone girls-only sport is flag football.

The Miami Norland basketball and football teams have enjoyed success in recent years by winning a number of FHSAA championships. The girls' basketball team won in 2009, and the boys' basketball squad were victorious in 2006, 2008, 2012–15. They also competed in the 2014 and 2015 Battle at The Villages, but only achieved as high as second place. The football team won the 2002 and 2011 titles.

== Notable faculty ==
- James Coley (football)
- William Lehman (teacher)
- Sergio Rouco (basketball)
- John Varone (football)
- Lawton Williams (basketball)

== Notable alumni ==
Miami Norland has produced a number of professional athletes, especially National Football League (NFL) players.

Name	Grad Class	Category	Best Known For
Antonio Brown	2006	American football	Seven-time Pro Bowl wide receiver, Super Bowl champion
Dwayne Bowe	2003	American football	Wide receiver, Pro Bowl selection
Xavier Rhodes	2008	American football	Cornerback, Pro Bowl selection
Darrin Smith	1988	American football	Linebacker, two-time Super Bowl champion
Mike McKenzie	1994	American football	Cornerback, Super Bowl champion
Carlton Davis	2015	American football	Cornerback, Super Bowl champion
Wilbur Summers	1973	American football	One of the earliest graduates to reach the NFL
John Turner	1974	American football	One of the earliest graduates to reach the NFL
Steve Griffin	1983	American football	Former NFL player
Randy Shannon	1984	American football	Former NFL player, later college coach
Kareem Brown	2001	American football	NFL defensive tackle
Antwan Barnes	2003	American football	NFL linebacker
Richard Gordon	2005	American football	NFL tight end
Travell Dixon	2009	American football	NFL cornerback
Tourek Williams	2009	American football	NFL linebacker
Lestar Jean	2006	American football	NFL wide receiver
Ereck Flowers	2012	American football	NFL offensive tackle
Duke Johnson	2012	American football	NFL running back
Vosean Joseph	2016	American football	NFL linebacker
Dewan Hernandez	2016	Basketball	Only graduate to play in the NBA
Amir Celestin	1990	Basketball	Professional basketball player (international)
Zachery Peacock	2006	Basketball	Professional basketball player (international)
Antonio Hester	2009	Basketball	Professional basketball player (international)
Tombi Bell	1997	Basketball	Played in the WNBA
Gil Patterson	1974	Baseball	Major League Baseball pitcher
Bruce Savage	1978	Soccer	Played for the United States men's national soccer team
Tyrese Cooper	2006	Track and field	Track athlete
Tabarie Henry	2006	Track and field	Olympic sprinter
Edwarda O'Bara	(did not graduate)		Longest coma patient on record
Ronni Sanlo	1969	Education	Educator and LGBTQ+ advocate
Daniel Conahan	1973		Convicted murderer and rapist
Ian Richards	1993	Law	Judge

== See also ==
- List of high schools in Florida
- List of United States high school national records in track and field
- Miami-Dade County Public Schools
