= Lavender Graduation =

Ceremony honoring LGBT students

Lavender graduation is an annual graduation ceremony conducted at universities to honor LGBTQ students and acknowledge their accomplishments and contributions. It was created by Ronni Sanlo, a lesbian keynote speaker in LGBTQ communities. Lavender graduation is an informal complement to an institution's formal commencement ceremony, rather than a replacement.

== History ==
Ronni Sanlo began this tradition after being denied access to attend her children's graduations due to her sexual orientation. Sanlo mentions that "Until 1995, there were no ceremonies to honor our LGBT students. There were only ceremonies for students of various ethnicities and for other groups like ROTC, but nothing for our students, those who tend to feel most disenfranchised from their colleges and universities."

The first lavender graduation took place at the University of Michigan in 1995 with three graduates. Today, over 200 colleges and universities offer lavender graduation ceremonies for their students.

== Ceremony ==
Like other commencement ceremonies, lavender graduation ceremonies typically include a speaker—who can be a student or a guest—and a reading of graduates' names. Depending on the school, attendance is open to all members of the campus LGBTQ community, though some schools require an application process prior to the ceremony. Students can also attend traditional commencement ceremonies. It is usually held before formal commencement.

The ceremony takes its name (and sometimes the color of tassels or other items given to students) from the significance of the color lavender in the LGBTQ community.
