= Ian Richards (judge) =

American judge (born 1975)

Ian J. Richards
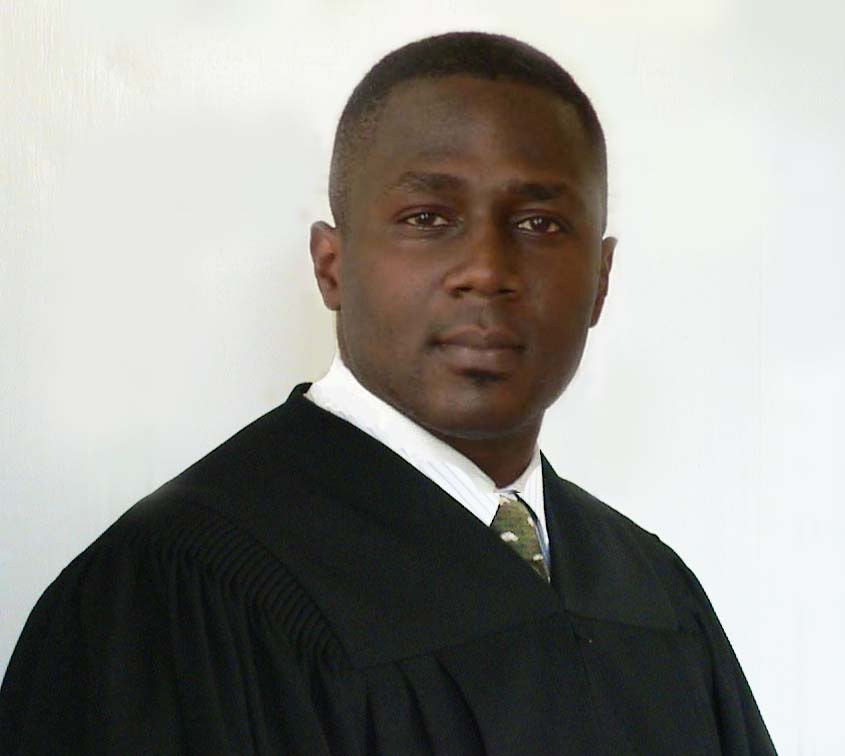

County Court Judge of Florida's 17th Judicial Circuit
- In office January 2009 – January 2015

Personal details
- Born: Ian Jason Richards; May 31, 1975 (age 51) Derbyshire, England, United Kingdom
- Citizenship: American; British (formerly)
- Education: Florida International University (B.Acc); University of Miami School of Law (JD)
- Profession: attorney, judge

Ian Jason Richards (born May 31, 1975) is a former county court judge in the Florida's 17th Judicial Circuit. Richards was the first African-American judge to be elected countywide in Broward County, Florida. He presided over State of Florida v. John Reasee, in which Richards jumped over his bench to protect a witness who was being attacked by the man against whom she had testified.

== Early life and career ==
Richards, the son of a mechanic and registered nurse, grew up in South Florida. He attended Shadowlawn Elementary School in the heart of Liberty City, and later graduated from Miami Norland Senior High School. Richards earned his Bachelor of Accounting degree, in 1999, from Florida International University. In 2002, Richards received a Juris Doctor degree from the University of Miami School of Law. Richards was a member of the UM Law School’s Honor Council.

Richards was defeated in a bid for re-election in 2014, despite his re-election effort being endorsed by major local newspapers.

Richards is married with three children.

== Career achievements ==
- 2002 to 2004 – Assistant State Attorney for the 11th Judicial Circuit
- 2004 to 2008 – private attorney in South Florida
- 2009 to 2014 – elected County Judge for the 17th Judicial Circuit

Richards is a member of the Broward Bar Association, the Florida Bar Association, and Federal Bar Association
