= Indian 100-rupee note =

Denomination of the Indian rupee

One hundred rupees
- Country: India
- Value: ₹100 (approx. $1.11)
- Width: 142 mm
- Height: 66 mm
- Security features: Security thread, latent image, micro-lettering, intaglio print, fluorescent ink, optically variable ink, watermark, and see through registration device.
- Years of printing: July 2018 – present

Obverse
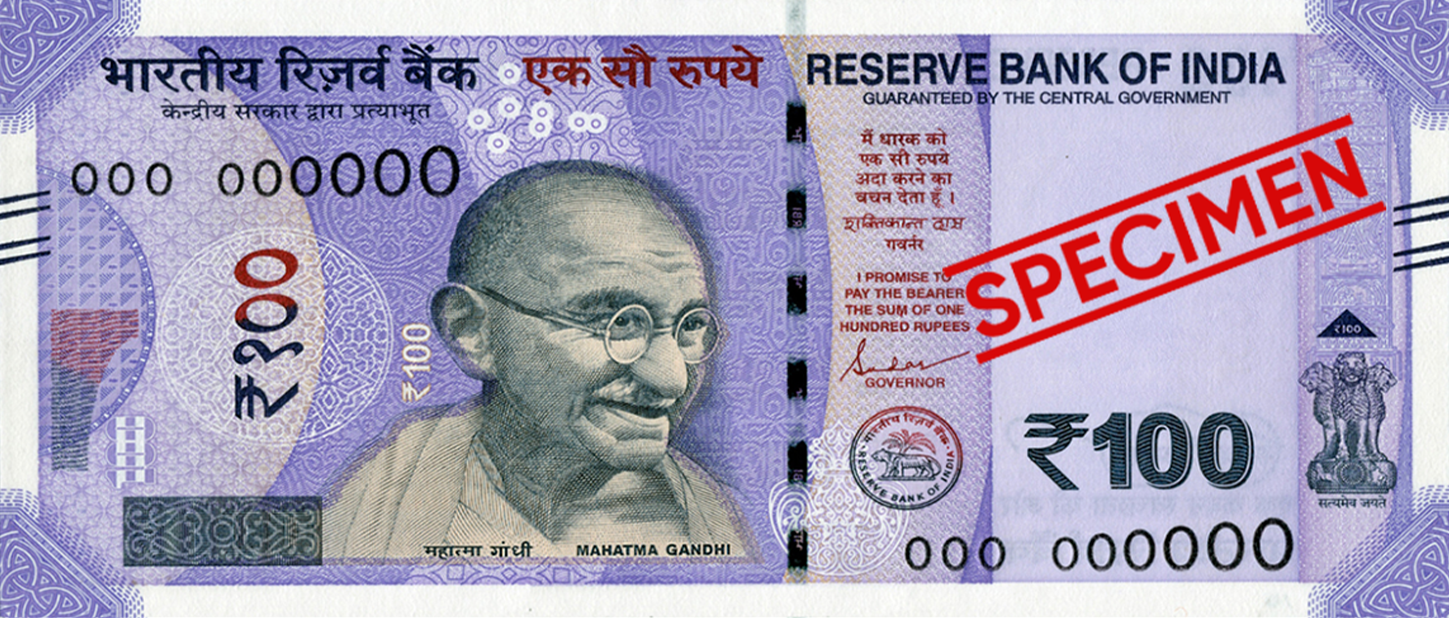
- Design: Mahatma Gandhi
- Designer: Reserve Bank of India
- Design date: 2018; 8 years ago

Reverse
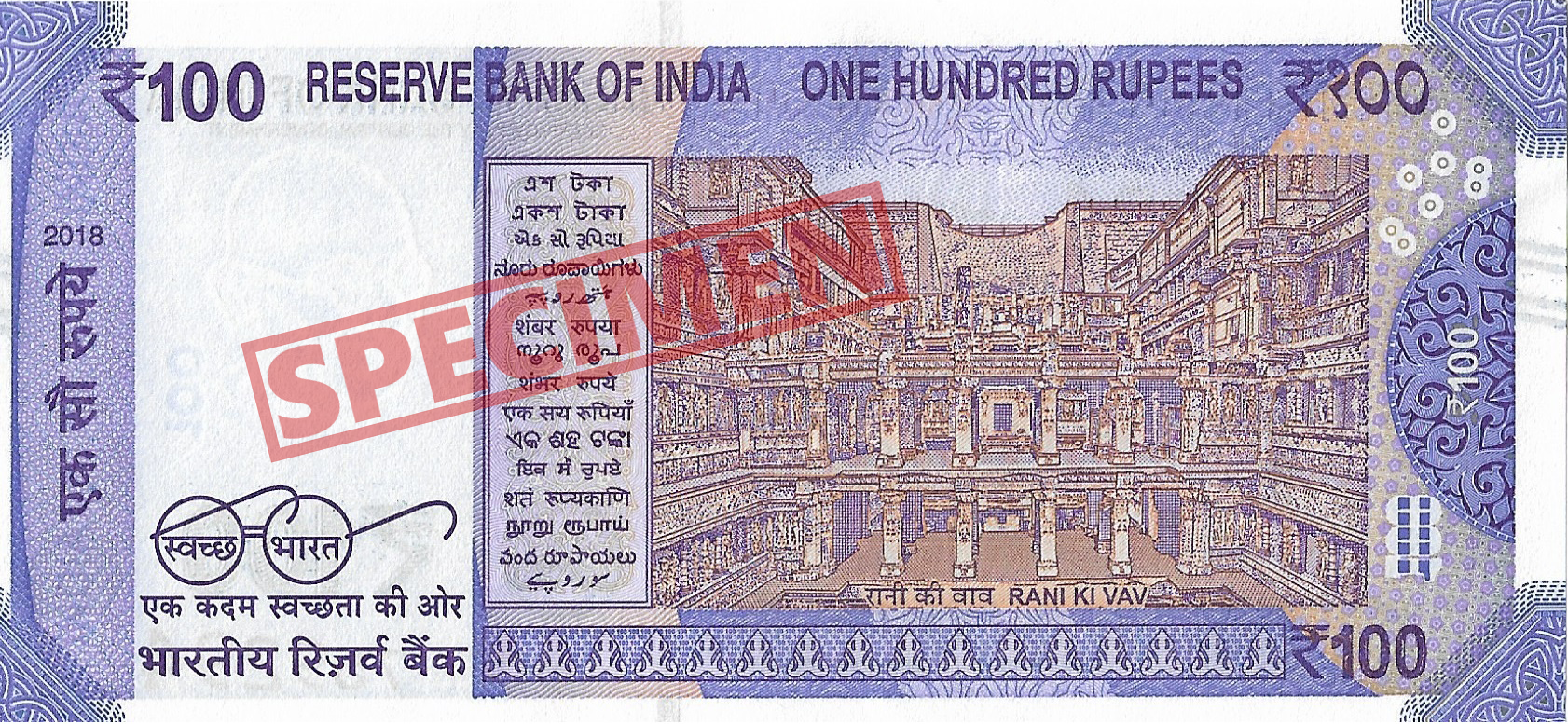
- Design: Rani ki vav
- Designer: Reserve Bank of India
- Design date: 2018; 8 years ago

The Indian 100-rupee banknote (₹100) is a denomination of the Indian rupee. It has been in continuous production since Reserve Bank of India took over the functions of the controller of currency in India in 1935. The present ₹100 banknote in circulation is a part of the Mahatma Gandhi New Series (which replaced the Mahatma Gandhi Series of ₹100 in 2018).

== History ==
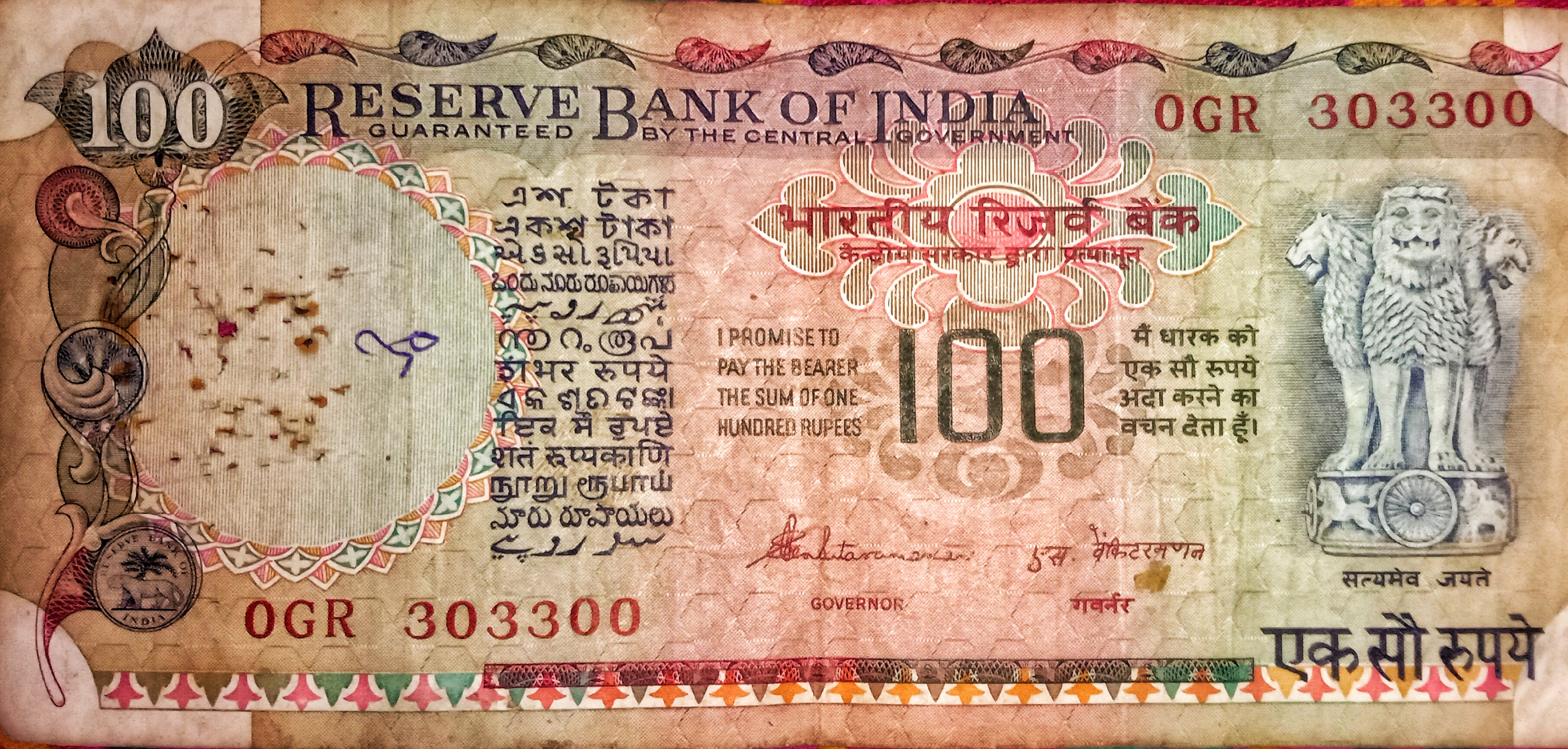
100-rupee banknote, signed by RBI governor S. Venkitaramanan.

The first 100-rupee note featured the portrait of George VI. After independence in 1947, Reserve Bank of India continued to issue the notes by replacing the portrait of George VI with the Emblem of India, as a part of the Lion Capital Series of banknotes.

== Mahatma Gandhi Series ==
=== Design ===
The ₹100 banknote of the Mahatma Gandhi Series is 157 × 73 mm blue-green coloured, with the obverse side featuring a portrait of Mahatma Gandhi with a signature of the governor of Reserve Bank of India.

As of 2012, the new ₹ sign has been incorporated into banknote of ₹100. In January 2014 RBI announced that it would be withdrawing from circulation all banknotes printed prior to 2005 by 31 March 2014. The deadline was later extended to 1 January 2015, and then again to 30 June 2016.

== Mahatma Gandhi New Series ==
On 10 November 2016, the Reserve Bank of India announced a new redesigned ₹100 banknote to be available as a part of the Mahatma Gandhi New Series. On 19 July 2018, the Reserve Bank of India unveiled the revised design of ₹100 banknote.

=== Design ===
The new bank note has a base color of Lavender with motif of Rani ki vav (Queen's stepwell) on the reverse side. Rani ki vav is located in Patan, Patan district, Gujarat, India. It is a UNESCO World Heritage Site. Dimensions of the bank note are measured at 142 mm × 66 mm.

=== Security features ===
The security features of the ₹100 banknote includes:

- A windowed security thread that reads 'भारत' (Bharat in the Devanagari script) and 'RBI' alternately.
- Latent image of the value of the banknote on the vertical band next to the right hand side of Mahatma Gandhi's portrait.
- Watermark of Mahatma Gandhi that is a mirror image of the main portrait.
- The number panel of the banknote is printed in embedded fluorescent fibers and optically variable ink.
- Since 2005 additional security features like machine-readable security thread, electrotype watermark, and year of print appears on the bank note.

== Languages ==
As like the other Indian rupee banknotes, the ₹100 banknote has its amount written in 17 languages. On the obverse, the denomination is written in English and Hindi. On the reverse is a language panel which displays the denomination of the note in 15 of the 22 official languages of India. The languages are displayed in alphabetical order. Languages included on the panel are Assamese, Bengali, Gujarati, Kannada, Kashmiri, Konkani, Malayalam, Marathi, Nepali, Odia, Punjabi, Sanskrit, Tamil, Telugu and Urdu.

Denominations in central level official languages (At below either ends)
| Language | ₹100 |
|---|---|
| English | One Hundred rupees |
| Hindi | एक सौ रुपये |
Denominations in 15 state level/other official languages (As seen on the language panel)
| Assamese | এশ টকা |
| Bengali | একশ টাকা |
| Gujarati | એક સો રૂપિયા |
| Kannada | ಒಂದು ನೂರು ರುಪಾಯಿಗಳು |
| Kashmiri | ہَتھ رۄپیہِ |
| Konkani | शंबर रुपया |
| Malayalam | നൂറു രൂപ |
| Marathi | शंभर रुपये |
| Nepali | एक सय रुपियाँ |
| Odia | ଏକ ଶହ ଟଙ୍କା |
| Punjabi | ਇਕ ਸੌ ਰੁਪਏ |
| Sanskrit | शतं रूप्यकाणि |
| Tamil | நூறு ரூபாய் |
| Telugu | నూరు రూపాయలు |
| Urdu | سو روپیے |
