= Raymond Broshears =

Preacher and LGBTQ activist (1935–1982)

Reverend Raymond Broshears
- Born: Earl Raymond Allen; February 14, 1935
- Died: January 10, 1982 (aged 46); San Francisco
- Education: Lee Bible College
- Political party: Peace and Freedom Party, Lavender Panther Party

Raymond Broshears (February 14, 1935 – January 10, 1982) was a gay Pentecostal Evangelist preacher and activist who founded the Lavender Panthers, an armed self-defense group for the LGBT community in San Francisco, active from the summer of 1973 until the spring of 1974. He also helped organize the first gay pride march in San Francisco in June 1972 and founded the Orthodox Episcopal Church of God.

== Background ==
After enlisting in the Navy in the 1950s, Raymond Broshears was discharged for a head injury. He enrolled in the Pentecostal Robert E. Lee Bible College in Cleveland, Tennessee in the mid fifties, and became a travelling preacher in the early 1960s. He claimed to have been the roommate of David Ferrie, arrested for alleged involvement in the assassination of John F. Kennedy. However some have rejected his claim.

Broshears moved west to Long Beach, California, and established a ministry and community centre on Skid Row designed to improve the quality of life for people living below the poverty line. By Christmas 1965 he moved to San Francisco where he lived for the rest of his life, having founded the short lived Lavendar Panthers, Gay Crusaider newsletters, and Open Hand, a center and food bank for poor gay people and others.

The late 60s and early 70s were a dangerous time politically for queer people, and Broshears picked up on a lack of protection from local law enforcement. He created the Lavender Panthers in response. The organisation was formed in July 1973, following a violent attack outside of Broshears’ community centre, Helping Hands, that left him unconscious.

== Controversy ==
Broshears' go-to response to violence and the threatening letters he constantly received was to report the actions to either the San Francisco Police Department, or the FBI; the latter of which has a file of three hundred pages of reports and documents on him; communications between Broshears and various special agents, as well as a large volume of threats he received. Newspaper articles flanked by hate speech and explicit threats were regularly mailed to Broshears.

Other gay rights organizations, however, saw the aggressive tactics that the Lavender Panthers were using, and were threatened.
