= Ronni Sanlo =

American writer (born 1948)

Ronni Lebman Sanlo (born March 20, 1948, in Miami, Florida, United States) is the director emeritus of the UCLA Lesbian Gay Bisexual Transgender Center and an authority on matters relating to LGBT (Lesbian, Gay, Bisexual and Transgender) students, faculty and staff in higher education. She recognized at an early age that she was a lesbian, but was too afraid to tell anybody. Sanlo went to college then married and had two children. At the age of 31, Ronni came out and lost custody of her young children. The treatment toward the LBGT community and her rights as a mother are what gave Sanlo the drive to get involved in activism and LGBT politics.

== Education ==
In Sanlo's early educational career, she attended Hebrew school and Jewish youth groups throughout her high school years at Miami Norland Senior High School. She graduated with a degree in music from the University of Florida in 1969 and attended the University of North Florida, where she obtained a Masters of Education in Counseling and a Doctorate of Education with a concentration in Educational Leadership/Organizational Development. Her dissertation was "Unheard Voices: The Effects of Silence on Lesbian and Gay Educators" (published by Greenwood Press, 1999).

== Career ==
Sanlo faced challenges in her professional life due to her sexual orientation, eventually finding a position as an HIV epidemiologist at the Florida Health Department. In 1994, she was hired by the University of Michigan to direct the Lesbian and Gay Men's Programs office, created in 1971 as the Human Sexuality Office (aka the Gay Advocate Office), under the leadership of Jim Toy. Shortly after she arrived, the university agreed to add "Bisexual" to the name of the office. A year before she relocated to UCLA, she persuaded the university to change the name again, to Office of Lesbian, Gay, Bisexual and Transgender Affairs. While at Michigan, Sanlo drafted the initial LGBT program standards for the Council for the Advancement of Standards in Higher Education (CAS), and was the founding chair of the Consortium of LGBT Resource Professionals in Higher Education.

Three years later, Sanlo was recruited by the University of California, Los Angeles to be director of its LGBT center. She became a professor at UCLA, where she drafted the Master of Education in Student Affairs curriculum, for the Higher Education and Organizational Change (HEOC) division of the School of Education and Information Studies. In 2010, she retired from UCLA and taught in the Educational Leadership program at California State University Fullerton for two years. Sanlo is retired and lives with her wife Dr. Kelly Watson in Palm Springs, California and Sequim, Washington.

== Letter to Anita: The Ronni Sanlo Story ==
This film was released in 2014 and features Meredith Baxter and Ronni Sanlo. It premiered at the Los Angeles LGBT film festival Outfest in 2014. The film's context shows Ronni Sanlo and her struggle with Anita Bryant's anti-gay campaign Save Our Children. Bryant helped overturn a Dade County Ordinance, which outlawed the discrimination against gays. This resulted in Ronni Sanlo losing custody of her children. The film depicts her work supporting people with HIV/AIDS and advocating for civil rights during the period when she lost custody of her children. Letter to Anita shows the "backdrop of the broader gay civil rights movement.".

Letter to Anita won the audience award for best documentary Feature and was a finalist for best documentary feature at the 25th Annual Tampa International Gay & Lesbian Film Festival.

== Books authored ==
Sanlo has written and edited several books and articles on the topic of gender identity and sexual orientation in higher education.

Books include:

- Unheard Voices: The Effects of Silence on Lesbian and Gay Educators, JF Bergin & Garvey, 1999
- Our Place on Campus: Lesbian, Gay, Bisexual, Transgender Services and Programs in Higher Education Greenwood, 2002
- Gender Identity and Sexual Orientation: Research, Policy, and Personal Perspectives: New Directions for Student Services, Number 111, 1 edition, Jossey-Bass, 2005
- Lesbian, Gay, and Bisexual College Students: Risk, Resiliency, and Retention, Journal of College Student Retention: Research, Theory and Practice, 6, 2004
- The Purple Golf Cart: The Misadventures of a Lesbian Grandma, Purple Books Publishing, 2013

== Lavender Graduation ==
Sanlo is credited with instituting the first 'Lavender Graduation' ceremony at the University of Michigan in 1995, a tradition now adopted by many universities. By 2001, there were over 45 Lavender Graduations at colleges and universities nationwide. The commencement takes place to acknowledge and honor lesbian, gay, transgender, bisexual and ally students and their contributions to the university. Lavender Graduation allows for LGBT students (all races and ethnicities) recognition within the university. The event honors their achievements, success and leadership in the university as an LGBT student and allows for pride and recognition of their identity. The ceremony also is not only for LGBT students, it is open to anyone supportive of the LGBT community.

== Awards ==
Sanlo has received the Los Angeles Gay and Lesbian Center's LACE (Lesbians and Bisexual Women Active in Community Empowerment) Award for Professional Achievement; Curve magazine's Top 20 Most Influential Lesbian Academics; Greater Palm Springs Pride Spirit of Stonewall Award; NASPA's Living the Legacy of the Profession of Student Affairs award; California Senate's Touch the Future Award; OUT magazine's 2000 Years 2000 Queers; Outstanding Service Award for Professionalism in AIDS Education in the Schools (awarded by the State of Florida Health and Rehabilitative Services); and the Outstanding Community Service Award from the Minority AIDS Services Coalition of Northeast Florida.

Three awards have been named for Sanlo: the Ronni Sanlo Student Leadership Award at the University of North Florida, the Ronni Sanlo Emerging Student Leader at UCLA, and the Ronni Sanlo Cornerstone Award at the University of Michigan's Lavender Graduation ceremony.
