= Lavender Panthers =

LGBTQ+ self-defence group in San Francisco

Lavender Panthers was an armed self-defence group for the LGBTQ+ community in San Francisco, active from the summer of 1973 until the spring of 1974. Its leader was Raymond Broshears, a gay Pentecostal Evangelist preacher and activist.

== Background ==
During the 1970s there was a sharp increase in violence against members of the LGBT community. This “antigay street violence” involved beatings, verbal harassment, and sometimes death. A case which ended in death and received national attention was the death of Robert Hillsborough in 1977. He was attacked by a group of teenagers due to his sexuality and his injuries resulted in him dying. This violence followed the Homophile movement, which had occurred during the previous decade. During this movement many riots, protests, and demonstrations occurred, including in San Francisco, a city that was known for having a large gay community. The homophile movement resulted in more visibility of LGBT communities. Areas around known gay bars or other queer identified experienced higher rates of assault. Police did very little in combating this violence.

Safe street patrols, such as the Lavender Panthers, were groups that formed to combat the violence that was being experienced. Although there were laws passed and public speeches made by police, the violence towards gay communities still existed. Most of these patrols took place during the 1970s, but the idea and creation of them persisted throughout Gay liberation. Some street patrols took a violent approach and others took more peaceful approaches. Peaceful tactics included the usage of whistles, a concept borrowed from the feminist movement. There was also variance in the amount of police involvement between different safe street patrols. Some, such as the Butterfly Brigade, had some police involvement while others saw the police as part of the issue.

== History ==
Lavender Panthers was founded in San Francisco in 1973 by Raymond Broshears. Broshears was a prominent member of the LGBT community and known for his work in Tenderloin, San Francisco. They were the first prominent safe street patrol in the Castro and Tenderloin. This area was particularly known for its trans and gay community. The patrols involved members walking streets and watching for altercations. Weapons would be carried, including shotguns and bats. The altercation that ended the group occurred in 1974. After witnessing a group throwing water balloons at gay community members, the patrol reacted with violence. Police were called and became involved with the interaction happening outside the Pendulum bar, directly leading to the group's end.

Although the name Lavender Panthers sounds similar to Black Panther Party, a Black rights group active during the same period, there is no connection between these two groups.
