= Wilbur Summers =

American football player (1954–2019)

No. 10
- Position: Punter

Personal information
- Born: August 6, 1954; Irvington, New Jersey, U.S.
- Died: November 1, 2019 (aged 65); Louisville, Kentucky, U.S.
- Listed height: 6 ft 4 in (1.93 m)
- Listed weight: 220 lb (100 kg)

Career information
- High school: Miami Gardens (FL) Norland
- College: Louisville
- NFL draft: 1976: 15th round, 418th overall pick

Career history
- Detroit Lions (1977)

Career NFL statistics
- Punts: 93
- Punt yards: 3,420
- Longest punt: 51
- Stats at Pro Football Reference

Wilbur Summers (August 6, 1954 – November 1, 2019) was an American professional football punter. He played for the Detroit Lions in 1977.

He died on November 1, 2019, in Louisville, Kentucky at age 65.
