= Digital rupee =

Central bank digital currency of India

Digital rupee (e₹)
Central Bank Digital Currencies
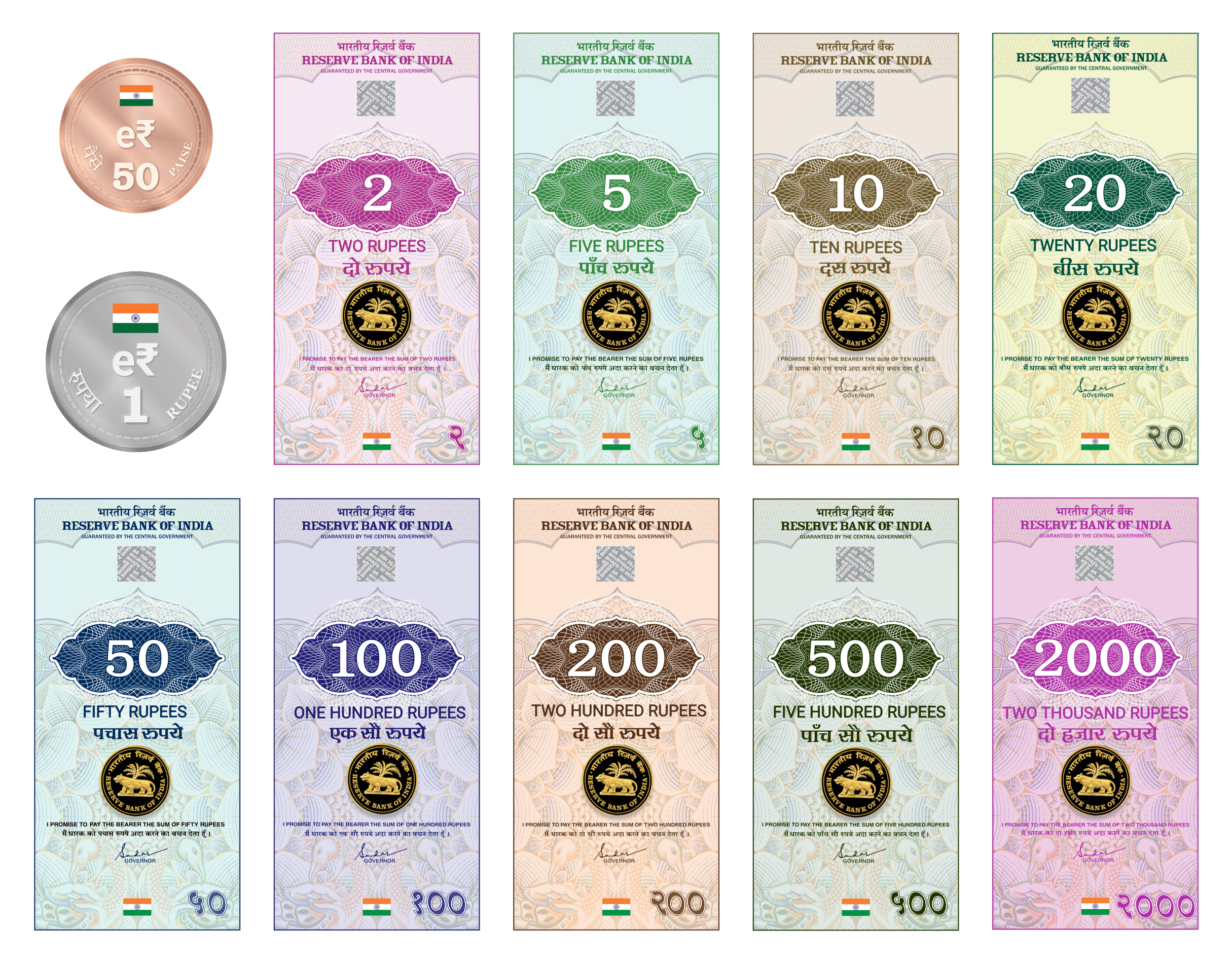
- Logo of the digital rupee Digital banknotes and coins

ISO 4217
- Code: INR (numeric: 356)
- Subunit: 0.01

Units of account
- Base unit: rupee
- Symbol: e₹
- Subunit
- 1/100: paisa
- Symbol

Denominations
- Banknotes
- Freq. used: e₹2, e₹5, e₹10, e₹20, e₹50, e₹100, e₹200, e₹500, e₹2,000
- Coins
- Freq. used: 50e, e₹1

Demographics
- Date of introduction: e₹-W: 1 November 2022; 4 years ago (pilot test); e₹-R: 1 December 2022; 3 years ago (pilot test)
- User(s): India

Issuance
- Central bank: Reserve Bank of India
- Website: www.rbi.org.in
- Printer: Reserve Bank Innovation Hub
- Website: rbihub.in

Valuation
- Inflation: ▼5.02% (October 2023)
- Source: RBI – Annual Inflation Report
- Method: Consumer price index (India)
- Pegged with: Indian rupee (at par)
- Value: USD $1 ≈ e₹83–84 EUR €1 ≈ e₹90–92 INR ₹1 = e₹1.00 (January 2026)

The digital rupee (e₹), eINR, or e-rupee is a tokenised digital version of the Indian rupee, issued by the Reserve Bank of India (RBI) as a central bank digital currency (CBDC). The digital rupee was proposed in January 2017 and launched on 1 December 2022.

Like banknotes it will be uniquely identifiable and regulated by the central bank. Liability lies with RBI. Plans include online and offline accessibility. RBI launched the Digital Rupee for Wholesale (e₹-W) catering to financial institutions for interbank settlements and the Digital Rupee for Retail (e₹-R) for consumer and business transactions. The implementation of the digital rupee aims to remove the security printing cost borne by the general public, businesses, banks, and RBI on physical currency which amounted to ₹49,848,000,000. By 2026, the RBI's focus had shifted from transaction volumes to testing specific functionalities such as Offline digital currency via NFC and user-level programmability for government transfers.

== History ==
In 2017, a high level inter-ministerial committee (IMC) was formed under the Department of Economic Affairs in Ministry of Finance (MoF) on the governance and usage of virtual currencies in India and recommended a digital form of fiat currency using Distributed Ledger Technology (DLT). The Department of Financial Services of MoF, Ministry of Electronics and Information Technology (MEITy) and the Reserve Bank of India (RBI) were invited to form a special group that will look into legal and technological development of CBDC. Without any official recognition of cryptocurrencies, RBI started planning on future CBDC development.

On 16 December 2020, the RBI announced a regulatory sandbox to test next generation technologies on cross border payments to collect field test data and evidence of benefits and risks on the financial ecosystem. On 29 January 2021, the Indian Government proposed a bill to ban trading and investments in cryptocurrencies while giving legal power to RBI for developing CBDC, termed as "programmable digital rupee" using the experience gained from handling Unified Payments Interface (UPI), Immediate Payment Service (IMPS) and Real-time gross settlement (RTGS) for distribution and validation purpose.

As per the Currency and Finance Report of 2021 released by RBI, CBDC backed by the sovereign must promote non-anonymity of monetary transactions and financial inclusion by direct transfers. It must be compliant with national and global money laundering and economic terrorism laws. The RBI initially planned the first stage of CBDC trials for December 2021; however, it was later rescheduled to Q1 2022, with a nationwide rollout planned in phases. As per Governor Shaktikanta Das, RBI is still in discussion whether to go with centralized system or use Distributed Ledger Technology. While the preliminary study will be conducted soon, RBI started internal evaluation on scope, legal framework, calibration, technology, distribution and validation mechanism of CBDC citing increase in digital transaction during the COVID-19 pandemic.

The Government of India is working on amendments for The Coinage Act, 2011, Foreign Exchange Management Act (FEMA), 1999, Information Technology Act, 2000 and Crypto-currency and Regulation of Official Digital Currency Bill, 2021 that will govern CBDC in the country.

The Department of Financial Services, Ministry of Health and Family Welfare and National Health Authority introduced e-RUPI on 2 August 2021 which is a prepaid person specific, purpose specific e-voucher based on QR code or SMS string that doesn't require bank account to make it leak proof. It is going to act as a precursor by highlighting the gaps in national digital payment infrastructure that needs further improvement before the nationwide launch of CBDC. At 2022 Union budget of India, Nirmala Sitharaman from the Ministry of Finance announced the roll out of the digital rupee starting from 2023. As per the International Monetary Fund, the digital rupee can help in currency management and cross border payments in view of high volume of inbound remittance.

The pilot in wholesale segment, known as the Digital Rupee – Wholesale (e₹-W), was launched on 1 November 2022, with use case being limited to the settlement of secondary market transactions in government securities. Use of (e₹-W), is expected to make the inter-bank market more efficient. Settlement in central bank money would reduce transaction costs by pre-empting the need for settlement guarantee infrastructure or for collateral to mitigate settlement risk. The pilot in retail segment, known as digital Rupee-Retail (e₹-R), was launched on 1 December 2022, within a closed user group (CUG) comprising participating customers and merchants.

== Concept stage ==
RBI started the process of designing CBDC framework in 2022. Finance Bill 2022 enacted with amendments in Reserve Bank of India Act, 1934 for CBDC. Reserve Bank Innovation Hub (RBIH) will develop proof of concept and run the pilot project before launch. As per Payments Vision 2025 document released by RBI on 17 June 2022, CBDC will be used for domestic and cross border payment processing and settlement. RBI classified CBDC into retail CBDC that will be designed to complete individual financial needs and wholesale CBDC which will be traded between RBI, Public and Private sector banks for currency distribution purpose and economic stability. RBI is also exploring purpose driven CBDC for Direct Benefit Transfer (DBT) to reduce subsidy leakage and corruption. Through the LF Decentralized Trust, the RBI and the MEITy are utilizing Linux Foundation's projects to build the National Blockchain Framework and the digital rupee.

For internal pilot project, RBI started consultation with FIS, State Bank of India, Punjab National Bank, Union Bank of India and Bank of Baroda. On 5 October 2022, the Fintech Department of RBI released a concept note to create awareness on CBDC and the planned features of the upcoming digital rupee (e₹). The structure of the digital rupee will be either token-based or account-based. For a token-based CBDC, it will act closer to physical cash and able to perform retail transactions. Account-based CBDC is for maintaining the balance sheet and is considered for institutional level wholesale transactions. For issuance, RBI is looking at single tier direct model where the central bank keeps control over every aspect of CBDC from account-keeping to transaction verification or a two tier indirect model where RBI issues CBDC to retail banks and financial service providers for wider circulation. RBI is also looking at offline transaction support.

In token-based system, a common public key will be used to initiate the transfer while private key such as user defined password will be used as verification tool to complete the transfer. As per RBI, an e-wallet will be provided for transaction purpose and bank account is not required. While transaction of smaller sums will remain anonymous, larger sums will require self disclosure in compliance with national and global money laundering and economic terrorism laws.

e₹-R will be outside commercial banking system that can help reduce concentration of liquidity and credit risks in payment systems mediated through commercial banks. As per RBI, CBDC will be an additional payment avenue for users and is not meant for replacing existing payment systems. The objective behind CBDC is to support and encourage the growing digital economy, reduce cost of physical cash management, create an efficient monetary payment system and further increase financial inclusion. The digital rupee is convertible to paper currency without change in value and will show in RBI balance sheet to build trust, safety, liquidity, settlement finality and integrity. To mitigate the risk of introducing a new technology in currency circulation, RBI will design the characteristics of the digital rupee closer to paper currency and introduce it in a seamless manner. Official launch may happen after 31 March 2023.

=== Offline usage ===
RBI is thinking about adding an offline usage capability to the digital rupee to offer availability and resilience in the event of a network outage or programmability issues. Without requiring a check-in with an online ledger, the offline digital payment systems could validate transactions and confirm the existence of funds. To accelerate the implementation, RBI and the NPCI are also focusing on feature phone-based payments in addition to purpose-defined transactions.

The digital rupee's offline capability and programmability have been announced by RBI on 8 February 2024. e₹-R will allow offline transactions in places with spotty or nonexistent internet access. Numerous offline methods, both proximity- and non-proximity-based, will be assessed in mountainous, rural, and urban settings in order to accomplish this goal. By late 2024, offline transactions were enabled using Near Field Communication (NFC) technology, allowing users to tap and pay without a live internet connection. This feature is designed to mimic the anonymity and ease of physical cash. Testing has also extended to feature phones to improve financial inclusion in rural areas.

Users such as government agencies will be able to guarantee that defined benefit payments are made thanks to programmability. In a similar vein, corporate will have the ability to schedule certain expenses such as staff business trips. It is also possible to program extra characteristics like the validity period or the regions in which CDBC can be utilised.

== Pilot project ==
The Digital Rupee for Wholesale (e₹-W) was launched on 1 November 2022. It will be used to settle secondary market transaction in government securities. It will help cut transaction cost and preventing the need for settlement guarantee infrastructure or for collateral to mitigate settlement risk. State Bank of India, Bank of Baroda, Union Bank of India, HDFC Bank, ICICI Bank, Kotak Mahindra Bank, Yes Bank, IDFC First Bank and HSBC are participating in the pilot project. Shaktikanta Das on 2 November 2022 revealed that the Digital Rupee for Retail (e₹-R) will also start similar trial in the same month. Each participating bank will test e₹-R among 10,000 to 50,000 people. RBI will collaborate with PayNearby and Bankit to integrate CBDC as payment option while National Payments Corporation of India (NPCI) will manage the backend infrastructure.

RBI will also undertake cross border transactions using the digital rupee during the pilot project. On 1 November 2022, the RBI used the digital rupee to settle Indian government bonds in secondary market transactions worth ₹2.75 billion Indian rupees ($33.29 million). The Phase-1 of pilot project for e₹-R will start from 1 December 2022 in Mumbai, New Delhi, Bengaluru, and Bhubaneswar under State Bank of India, ICICI Bank, Yes Bank, and IDFC First Bank. Ahmedabad, Gangtok, Guwahati, Hyderabad, Indore, Kochi, Lucknow, Patna, and Shimla will be included in Phase-2 under Bank of Baroda, Union Bank of India, HDFC Bank, and Kotak Mahindra Bank. e₹-R will have both P2P and P2M support. A person can pay using QR code. Once e₹-R transferred to individual wallet, small value transactions will not be traced by banks to maintain anonymity.

In November 2022, e₹-W on average did ₹3,250,000,000 worth of deals per day. For the first two days of e₹-R pilot, ₹30,000,000 worth of digital currencies were created by RBI. Unlike physical currency, there is an option for recovery against loss of e₹. In e₹-R pilot phase, RBI is testing specific use cases for P2P and P2M transaction. RBI is also planning to extend use case of e₹ in cross border transaction at institutional and individual level. As per Minister of State for Finance Pankaj Chaudhary, CBDC in itself will not earn any interest but can be converted into bank deposits. He also clarified that e₹-R is using Blockchain technology. As per RBI, the digital rupee has reached 50,000 users and 5,000 merchants as of 8 February 2023. RBI is going to launch pilot project for inter-bank borrowing using digital rupee from October 2023.

In the retail sector usage of the digital rupee, the RBI has achieved its goal of one million daily transactions on 27 December 2023. The administration of Union Bank of India (UBI) plans to transfer numerous employee benefits on CBDC wallet in an effort to promote the wallet, nevertheless, the employee federation advocacy group wants the management to take the employees into confidence first regarding the usage.

In order to assess the durability of the system at scale, the RBI set a goal of one million retail transactions every day for the digital rupee that was met by December 2023. Following the conclusion of system stress tests, the number of daily transactions decreased to 100,000 as of June 2024. Google Pay, PhonePe, Amazon Pay, Cred, and MobiKwik are attempting to participate in the digital currency pilot. It is anticipated that they will begin to give digital rupee access in 2024. Prior to April 2024, the RBI had only allowed banks to offer digital rupee through their mobile applications. However, the central bank later announced that payment companies could also offer digital rupee transactions using their platform after receiving RBI approval.

=== UPI Interoperability ===
As part of the Central Bank Digital Currency pilot project, Canara Bank has released the Unified Payments Interface compatible digital rupee mobile app. Without the need for a separate on-boarding procedure for CBDC for retailers, it will enable users to scan the existing UPI QR code and make payments using digital rupee. Customers in 26 Indian cities who have been whitelisted can access the service as part of a pilot program. On 30 August 2023, Yes Bank unveiled the integration of UPI for digital rupee payment. Customers can send digital rupee using existing UPI virtual payment addresses. Beginning on 4 September 2023, State Bank of India (SBI) started offering UPI compatibility with digital rupee. This integration was made possible by SBI's involvement in the RBI's December 2022 retail digital e-rupee project.

As part of the CBDC pilot project, Bank of Baroda have announced the addition of a UPI interoperability feature to their digital rupee application. Additionally, Kotak Mahindra Bank activated UPI interoperability. Additionally, Axis Bank disclosed that the "Axis Mobile Digital Rupee" CBDC app now supports UPI. To become the first commercial bank to finish the integration process in India, HDFC Bank introduced a UPI QR code that was compatible with the digital rupee.

=== Cross-border settlement ===
The RBI Internal Working Group is looking for the viability of rapid and low-cost digital cross-border settlements using the CBDC mechanism, with their counterparts in the US, Hong Kong, and SWIFT. According to RBI, cross-border payments may be made using the digital currency issued by the central bank. A shared platform created as part of Project Dunbar, led by the Bank for International Settlements (BIS), can be used for this.

=== User-Level Programmability ===
The digital rupee pilot project's programmable feature was expanded by the RBI on 30 August 2024, to include additional use cases in the areas of fuel, groceries, education, dining out, healthcare, and travel. This functionality ensures that funds are "purpose-bound." For example, government transfers for fertilizer subsidies can be programmed to be spendable only at registered fertilizer outlets, reducing subsidy leakage.

== Market acceptance ==
User acceptance of Digital rupees has remained very low. As of late 2024, Digital Rupee usage was about 0.006% of all total banknotes in circulation - though pilots had been running for nearly two years.

The wholesale segment has fared even worse, with its value dropping to just Rs 0.08 crore in March 2024, down from Rs 10 crore in March 2023.

Reliance Retail in partnership with Innoviti Technologies, ICICI Bank and Kotak Mahindra Bank became the first big organised retail chain in the country to accept e₹-R. CCAvenue became the first payment gateway to process e₹-R for online retail transaction. A cooperation between Indraprastha Gas and IndusInd Bank was launched, with the aim of enabling the usage of digital rupee at specific gas stations within the National Capital Region (NCR) area.

Using programmable digital rupees, IndusInd Bank completed transactions on 22 April 2024, to compensate farmers for carbon credits. Farmers are now able to trade their carbon credits for CBDCs, whereas previously they could only receive fiat money. Fifty farmers from Maharashtra took part in the initiative.

The value of digital rupee increased from ₹100 crore in December 2023 to ₹323.5 crore as of 31 May 2024. As of March 2025, the pilot had expanded to 17 participating banks with over 60 lakh (6 million) users. The value of e-rupee in circulation grew to ₹1,016 crore (US$120 million) by March 2025.

On 29 August 2024, HDFC Bank introduced user-level programmability on the digital rupee. It is now supported by the HDFC Bank Digital Rupee Wallet, allowing users to guarantee that payments are paid for specified purpose. Individual users can optionally design other characteristics using this capability, such as the validity period or the geographic regions in which the digital rupee can be utilised.

== Criticism ==
Since using digital rupee was essentially the same as internet banking, which customers were already happy with, stakeholders are not seeing any benefits. Another negative aspect of using digital rupees was that each trade had to be completed separately, unlike traditional interbank payment systems where trades were netted off first and then settled in bulk with the clearing house. Furthermore, transactions in digital rupees do not completely replace those conducted through traditional channels, thus making banks' accounting tasks heavier. It leads to increased labor and paperwork.

According to an Indian banker, UPI gained a lot of traction because of its obvious benefits. Given the ease and efficiency of this type of digital transaction, the move would not occur naturally—in fact, the retail sector might respond to digital rupee less favourably than the wholesale segment. The International Monetary Fund claimed that there were too many parallels between instant payment systems and CBDCs to overlook, which could restrict the adoption of the new digital currencies.

== The Pilot banks currently offering CBDC wallets to users ==
Currently, 19 banks are offering CBDC wallets.

Pilot Banks	Name of the App	Android	iOS
SBI	eRupee by SBI	Android	iOS
ICICI Bank	Digital Rupee by ICICI Bank	Android	iOS
IDFC First Bank	IDFC First Bank Digital Rupee	Android	iOS
Yes Bank	Yes Bank Digital Rupee	Android*	Will be available shortly
*In case of Yes Bank, CBDC wallets may be accessed using their unified application (link above), by following the steps as below: (i) Login into the App. (ii) Click "My Digital Rupee Wallet". (iii) User will land in CBDC home page where user can initiate CBDC transactions.
HDFC Bank	HDFC Bank Digital Rupee	Android	iOS
Union Bank of India	Digital Rupee by UBI	Android	iOS
Bank of Baroda	Bank of Baroda Digital Rupee	Android	iOS
Kotak Mahindra Bank	Digital Rupee by Kotak Bank	Android	iOS
Canara Bank	Canara Digital Rupee	Android	iOS
Axis Bank	Axis Mobile Digital Rupee	Android	iOS
IndusInd Bank	Digital Rupee by IndusInd Bank	Android	iOS
PNB	PNB Digital Rupee	Android	iOS
Federal Bank	Federal Bank Digital Rupee	Android	iOS
Karnataka Bank	Karnataka Bank Digital Rupee	Android	iOS
Indian Bank	Indian Bank Digital Rupee	Android	iOS
IDBI Bank	IDBI eRupee	Android	iOS
Bank of Maharashtra	eRupee by Bank of Maharashtra	Android	iOS
Bank of India	Bank of India Digital Rupee	Android	iOS
UCO Bank	UCO Digital Rupee	Android	Will be available shortly

== See also ==
- Unified Payments Interface
- Central bank digital currency
- Digital renminbi
- eNaira
- E-Cedi
- Petro (cryptocurrency)
