= Bejoy Das Gupta =

Indian economist

- Born: Kolkata, India

Academic background
- Education: London School of Economics; Christ Church, Oxford

Academic work
- Institutions: Institute of International Finance; eCurrency; Syracuse University

Bejoy Das Gupta is an Indian economist whose work has focused on emerging markets, capital flows and central bank digital currency (CBDC). He was chief economist for Asia at the Institute of International Finance (IIF) before becoming chief economist of eCurrency in 2018. He has also served on the Bank of England's CBDC Technology Forum and taught at Syracuse University's Maxwell School of Citizenship and Public Affairs.

== Early life and education ==
Das Gupta was born in Kolkata. He is the son of Manindra Nath Das Gupta and Pratima Das Gupta (née Sen). His father took part in the Indian independence movement and later worked as a corporate lawyer and businessman. His mother was a lawyer at the Calcutta High Court and was active in social work, including the rehabilitation of refugees from East Bengal. He is the youngest of three brothers; his elder brother Dipak Dasgupta is an economist.

Das Gupta attended St. Xavier's Collegiate School and La Martiniere for Boys in Kolkata. He earned a bachelor's degree in economics from the London School of Economics and MPhil and DPhil degrees in economics from Christ Church, Oxford. His doctoral thesis, completed in 1991, was titled Exports and Exchange Rate Policy: The Case of India. An essay based on his thesis, "Determinants of Exports from Developing Countries", won the Asia Prize in the 1988 AMEX Bank Review Awards.

== Career ==
Das Gupta joined the IIF's Asia/Pacific department in 1993 and later became its chief economist for Asia. His work there covered economic analysis and country risk in the region, including capital flows and foreign direct investment. During his IIF career, Das Gupta participated in discussions on India's capital inflows and macro and investment policy, including IIF meetings in New Delhi in March 2011. His commentary on Asian economies and financial markets has appeared in the Financial Times, The Wall Street Journal and CNBC.

Das Gupta became chief economist of eCurrency, a company that develops technology for central bank digital currencies, in 2018. His work there focused on central bank engagement and on the use of digital currency for financial inclusion. During his tenure, eCurrency designed and supported the implementation of Jamaica’s CBDC, one of the first in the world. Das Gupta participated in the "Could Central Bank Digital Currencies Transform the Economy?" panel at the University of Michigan's Central Bank of the Future conference in November 2020. He also presented on digital finance and financial inclusion at an Otoritas Jasa Keuangan policy dialogue held during the IMF–World Bank annual meetings in Bali in October 2018. In April 2019, he presented "CBDC for Financial Inclusion – Design Considerations" at the IMF's New Economy Forum. With Miles Au Yeung, Das Gupta co-authored an article for OMFIF proposing digital tokens based on special drawing rights as a means of improving cross-border payments. After his work at eCurrency, Das Gupta advised the International Finance Corporation's macroeconomic and markets research group, supporting private sector lending, investment, country advisory, and risk management in East and South Asia.

Das Gupta was vice chair of the Policy and Governance Working Group of the International Telecommunication Union's Digital Currency Global Initiative, where he led its financial inclusion workstream and spoke at a 2021 webinar. He also presented at the ITU's DC 3 conference, From Cryptocurrencies to CBDCs. He wrote the workstream's final report, published in May 2022. In September 2021, Das Gupta was named a member of the Bank of England's CBDC Technology Forum, which advised on the technology of a possible digital pound.

Das Gupta was a founding member of the advisory board of the Mandiri Institute, a research body set up by Bank Mandiri in 2014, and spoke at the bank's investment forum in 2018. He has also served on the board of directors of Electrovaya, a lithium-ion battery company.

Das Gupta is an adjunct professor at the Maxwell School of Citizenship and Public Affairs of Syracuse University in Washington, D.C.
