= Fake Indian currency note =

Currency Note

Fake Indian Currency Note (FICN) is a term used by officials and media to refer to counterfeit currency notes circulated in the Indian economy. In 2012, while responding to a question in parliament, the Finance Minister, P. Chidambaram, admitted that there is no confirmed estimate of fake currency in India.

On 8 November 2016, Indian Prime Minister Narendra Modi announced that the hitherto existing 500 and 1000 rupee notes cease to be legal tender. He said that the move is taken to curb black money and widespread counterfeit currency in the country. He introduced new ₹500 and ₹2000 notes, and discontinued the existing ₹1000 note.

== Background ==
Although fake currency is being printed with precision, the Crime Investigation Department (CID) says that they can be detected with some effort. Currency printed by local racketeers can be detected easily as they use the photographic method, hand engraved blocks, lithographic processes and computer colour scanning. In counterfeit notes, the watermark is made by using opaque ink, painting with white solution, stamping with a dye engraved with the picture of Mahatma Gandhi. Then oil, grease or wax is applied to give the picture a translucent feel. In genuine notes, the security thread is incorporated into the paper at the time of manufacture. But in fake notes, the security thread is imitated by drawing a line with a pencil, by printing a line with grey ink, or by using aluminium thread while pasting two thin sheets of paper. Forgers find it difficult to reproduce the same shape of individual numbers again and again with accuracy. The alignment of figures is also difficult to maintain. Spreading of ink, smaller or bigger number, inadequate gaps, and different alignments in numbers should be regarded with suspicion. In counterfeit notes, the printed lines will be broken and there may also be ink smudges. In recent times it has been reported that FICN match 10 out of 14 security parameters adopted by the Indian government, with suggestions that the highest quality fakes could have only been produced by a nation state.

== Legal aspect ==
According to Indian law, possessing fake notes is a punishable offence, but only if the person in question is aware that the notes are fake. The Indian government intends to classify offences involving high-value FICN as terror acts, with an amendment to the Unlawful Activities (Prevention) Act.

== Terrorism ==
Fake Indian notes are mainly used in terror related activities. The money mainly flows from Nepal, Pakistan and Bangladesh. The terrorists are using it to cripple the Indian economy and to create economic terror.

== See also ==
- 2016 Indian banknote demonetisation
