= Central bank digital currencies by country =

A wide range of countries and currency unions have explored, piloted, or deployed central bank digital currencies (CBDCs), which serve as direct liabilities of a central bank and legal tender alongside physical cash and bank deposits. National initiatives generally focus either on wholesale CBDCs for interbank settlements or retail CBDCs for use by the general public.

Surveys by the Bank for International Settlements (BIS) and tracking by the Atlantic Council indicate that over 130 jurisdictions, representing 98 percent of global GDP, are actively exploring CBDCs, with over 90 percent of surveyed central banks engaged in research or testing. Full retail rollouts include the Bahamas (Sand Dollar, 2020), the Eastern Caribbean Central Bank (DCash, 2021), Nigeria (eNaira, 2021), and Jamaica (JAM-DEX, 2022). Several large economies have deployed extensive pilots, including China with the digital renminbi, India with the digital rupee, Russia with the digital ruble, and the European Central Bank with preparations for a digital euro, whereas the United States halted federal CBDC initiatives in January 2025.

== Australia ==
On 9 August 2022, the Reserve Bank of Australia announced a research project to explore a CBDC in Australia, in collaboration with the Digital Finance Cooperative Research Centre (DFCRC).

== Bahamas ==
On 20 October 2020, the Central Bank of the Bahamas introduced the "Sand Dollar" as a digital legal currency equivalent to the traditional Bahamian dollar.

== Brazil ==
The Central Bank of Brazil was developing a digital version of the Brazilian sovereign currency, known as Drex, based on the guidelines established in May 2021, and aiming to release the CBDC by the end of 2024. It received praise from the International Monetary Fund (IMF) for its role in driving financial innovation and expanding digital financial services in Latin America.

== China ==
Since 2014, China's central bank has been working on a project called DCEP (Digital Currency Electronic Payment) or digital renminbi, often also referred to as the "digital yuan" as it would be backed by the yuan.

At the end of 2017, China's central bank organized a number of banks and institutions to jointly develop the DCEP system. In April 2020, DCEP began to be tested in four big Chinese cities: Shenzhen, Suzhou, Xiong'an and Chengdu.

The Shenzhen and Suzhou trials chose participants through a lottery, enabling them to use the DCEP in designated specific areas. The Shenzhen trial only included online payment functionalities, generally using QR codes like Alipay and WeChat Pay. However, along with online payments, the Suzhou trials also enabled users to make near-field communication (NFC) offline payments. This feature was originally designed for people in rural areas who do not have reliable internet access.

After the CBDC pilot, the Suzhou municipal government signed a Memorandum of Understanding (MoU) with the New York-based blockchain startup Cypherium to assist the city in technology development.

In 2021, Chinese cities further expanded the use of the digital yuan, officially known as e-CNY, within their public transportation networks. Chengdu became the first city to implement e-CNY payments across its entire public transportation system, including all buses and subway lines. This integration is part of a broader pilot operation phase aiming to test the digital currency's feasibility and utility in everyday transactions. Subsequently, Beijing and Suzhou also integrated e-CNY into their public transit systems, with Beijing enabling e-CNY payments on all 24 subway lines and Suzhou on its newly opened subway line 5. This expansion marks a significant step in China's efforts to enhance the practical usage of its central bank digital currency, illustrating the government's commitment to digitizing the national currency for widespread public use.

At the end of 2021, there were 261 million users in the extended trial who had made US$13.8 billion of transactions. It was also made available to foreign visitors at the 2022 Winter Olympics in Beijing, where it saw limited use due to established payment methods, Visa, and limited publicity.

On 31 March 2022, the People's Bank of China announced that testing had been expanded to six additional regions: Tianjin, Chongqing, Guangzhou, Fuzhou, Xiamen, and six cities in the province of Zhejiang hosting the 2022 Asian Games (Hangzhou, Ningbo, Wenzhou, Huzhou, Shaoxing, and Jinhua). A statement from the PBOC indicated that Beijing and Zhangjiakou were also included in testing following the 2022 Winter Olympics.

== Eastern Caribbean ==
The Eastern Caribbean Central Bank (ECCB) launched the CBDC known as "DCash" in March 2021 to Antigua and Barbuda, Grenada, St. Kitts and Nevis, and St. Lucia, becoming the first CBDC to be introduced in a currency union. It subsequently rolled out the CBDC to the rest of the Organization of Eastern Caribbean States, including St. Vincent and the Grenadines, Dominica, Montserrat and Anguilla.

On 12 January 2024, DCash was paused due to technical issues that prevented users from accessing their digital wallets. A redesigned platform, DCash 2.0, was scheduled for introduction in 2026.

== Ecuador ==
One of the earliest retail CBDC initiatives occurred in Ecuador between 2014 and 2018, when the Central Bank of Ecuador operated "Dinero Electrónico" (DE) through mobile networks without distributed ledger technology. While some analysts cited low public adoption as a primary reason for its cancellation, the system reached over 400,000 registered accounts and US$10 million in deposits. Scholars concluded that its decommissioning was primarily driven by opposition from commercial banks, which viewed the platform as a threat to their retail payment revenue and raised concerns about potential de-dollarization.

== European Union/Eurozone ==
In the Eurozone, the Bank of Spain's former governor Miguel Angel Fernandez Ordoñez has called for the introduction of a digital euro, but the European Central Bank (ECB) has so far denied such possibility. Nevertheless, in December 2019, the ECB stated that "The ECB will also continue to assess the costs and benefits of issuing a central bank digital currency (CBDC) that could ensure that the general public will remain able to use central bank money even if the use of physical cash eventually declines". On 2 October 2020 the ECB nonetheless published a report on the proposed digital euro and kickstarted a two-year study phase to prepare a decision for a central bank digital currency.

After completing the study phase, the ECB decided on 18 October 2023 to enter into a preparation phase for the potential issuance of a digital euro.

The day after an executive order signed by Donald Trump promoted U.S. dollar-pegged stablecoins, on 24 January 2025, European Central Bank (ECB) board member Piero Cipollone said "I guess the key word here [in Trump's executive order] is worldwide" and "This solution, you all know, further disintermediates banks as they lose fees, they lose clients...That's why we need a digital euro." In August 2025, ECB president Christine Lagarde urged European lawmakers to "seize the 'euro moment'" and rapidly put in place a legislative framework to "pave the way for the potential introduction of a digital euro," to address the risk posed by U.S. dollar-linked stablecoins.

== France and Switzerland ==
In June 2021, the Swiss National Bank and Bank of France launched a cross-border CBDC payments trial designed for wholesale (bank-to-bank, rather than with regular consumers) transactions. Switzerland had previously tested a digital Swiss franc for instant transactions on SIX Swiss Exchange, its premier stock exchange.

In June 2024, the Swiss National Bank (SNB) announced an extension of the pilot (Project Helvetia III) for two additional years to explore new use cases and expand settlement scope.

== India ==
The Reserve Bank of India (RBI) on 16 December 2020 announced a regulatory sandbox to test next generation technologies on cross-border payments to collect field test data and evidence of benefits and risks on the financial ecosystem. On 29 January 2021, the Government of India proposed a bill to ban trading and investments in cryptocurrencies while giving legal authority to the RBI to develop a CBDC.

During the announcement of the 2022 Union budget of India, Nirmala Sitharaman from the Ministry of Finance announced the roll out of the Digital Rupee from 2023. As per the RBI Payments Vision 2025 document released on 17 June 2022, CBDC will be used for domestic and cross-border payment processing and settlement. RBI classified CBDC into retail CBDC designed to meet individual financial needs and wholesale CBDC traded between the RBI and commercial banks for currency distribution and settlement.

A pilot project for the digital rupee was launched on 1 November 2022.

== Indonesia ==
Bank Indonesia initiated Project Garuda to develop an Indonesian central bank digital currency on 30 November 2022. Bank Indonesia issued a white paper on the architectural framework for the digital rupiah. Following the enactment of the Law on Financial Sector Development and Strengthening, the digital rupiah was formally recognized as an official form of the rupiah.

== Iran ==
Between 2016 and 2018, interest in CBDCs in Iran was described by American analysts as an effort to circumvent United States sanctions.

== Iraq ==
In 2025 and 2026, the Central Bank of Iraq announced plans to launch a digital dinar.

== Jamaica ==
Jamaica launched its CBDC, known as JAM-DEX, in July 2022, with the Bank of Jamaica recognizing it as legal tender, making Jamaica the first country to formally legalise a CBDC as legal tender.

== Myanmar ==
On 26 June 2022, Myanmar's parallel National Unity Government (NUG) established the Digital Myanmar kyat (DMMK) alongside its companion mobile wallet NUGPay. According to the NUG's Ministry of Planning, Finance and Investment, DMMK is pegged 1:1 to the Myanmar kyat (MMK).

== Nigeria ==
In May 2021, the Central Bank of Nigeria (CBN) announced plans to create a digital currency, naming Bitt Inc. as technical partner in August 2021. On 25 October 2021, President Muhammadu Buhari officially launched the eNaira, making Nigeria the first African country to issue a CBDC.

== Nepal ==
In April 2025, Nepal Rastra Bank announced plans to begin preliminary pilot testing of a CBDC pegged 1:1 to the Nepalese rupee.

== New Zealand ==
In September 2021, public consultation on a CBDC for New Zealand was opened by the Reserve Bank. The potential digital currency would be tied 1:1 to the New Zealand dollar.

== Norway ==
In April 2021, after four years of research, Norway's Norges Bank announced plans to start testing technical solutions for a CBDC over the following two years.

== Russia ==
In October 2020, the Central Bank of Russia published a consultation paper on a digital ruble. A prototype platform was completed in December 2021, followed by initial interbank testing in early 2022.

On 24 July 2023, President Vladimir Putin signed legislation establishing the digital ruble as an official form of national currency alongside cash and bank deposits, and designating the Bank of Russia as the platform operator. The law entered into force on 1 August 2023.

On 15 August 2023, the Bank of Russia launched real-transaction pilot testing involving 13 commercial banks and a limited number of clients and merchants across 11 cities. On 1 September 2024, the pilot was expanded to include up to 9,000 individuals and 1,200 companies, introducing dynamic QR code payments and business-to-business transfers.

== Singapore ==
On June 21, 2023, the Monetary Authority of Singapore (MAS) published a whitepaper proposing a common protocol to specify conditions for the use of digital money including CBDCs on a distributed ledger. The whitepaper was developed in collaboration with the International Monetary Fund, Bank of Italy, Bank of Korea, financial institutions and fintech firms.

== South Korea ==
Project Hangang is a blockchain-based digital currency experiment. From the perspective of financial consumers, the service can be utilized by creating a dedicated digital currency wallet—separate from regular deposits—on participating banks' apps for payments and remittances.

This is a type of hybrid system in which the central bank supplies wholesale CBDC to banks, and the banks then create digital currency usable by the general public based on it to provide services.

== Sweden ==
The central bank of Sweden proposed an "e-krona" in November 2016, and started testing an e-krona proof of concept in 2020. The 2020 phase focused on internal simulations within Sweden's central bank; the second phase in 2021 included testing with external participants, including commercial banks. The third phase in 2022 evaluated governance and technical requirements for potential integration into the commercial banking system.

== Turkey ==
In January 2021, the Central Bank of the Republic of Turkey (CBRT) announced a planned digital currency trial in the second half of 2021.

The CBRT successfully tested the first payment transaction using the digital lira in January 2023, and planned to run further phases of pilot studies to widen participation in 2023.

== United Arab Emirates ==
In March 2023, the Central Bank of the United Arab Emirates (CBUAE) announced the implementation of its CBDC strategy, known as the "Digital Dirham".

In October 2023, the United Arab Emirates enacted Federal Law No. 54 of 2023, expanding the legal definition of currency to include a "National Digital Currency".

In January 2024, the UAE executed its first cross-border payment using the Digital Dirham, transferring 50 million dirhams (US$13.6 million) to China.

== Ukraine ==
In December 2018, the National Bank of Ukraine piloted a digital currency, the e-hryvnia, with about 5,500 tokens. It is considering how to technically advance a nationwide launch.

== United Kingdom ==
The Bank of England discussed a blockchain-based central bank currency in a September 2015 speech by chief economist Andrew G. Haldane, on possible ways to implement negative interest rates. A March 2016 speech by Ben Broadbent, the bank's deputy governor of monetary policy, appears to be the first use of the phrase "central bank digital currency", and notes direct inspiration by Bitcoin. In April 2021, the Bank of England and HM Treasury announced a joint CBDC Taskforce to examine the possibility of a CBDC in the United Kingdom.

== United States ==
In May 2021, Federal Reserve Chair Jerome Powell announced plans to publish a discussion paper on central bank digital currency, focusing on the possibility of issuing a US CBDC. Powell believed that a potential CBDC would complement the use of cash and bank deposits rather than replacing them. In February 2022, the Federal Reserve Bank of Boston released initial details of Project Hamilton, a potential United States CBDC. While incorporating some of the architecture of bitcoin, it was designed without decentralization or mining, allowing the government to retain monetary sovereignty.

Also in May 2021, the Digital Dollar Project, a partnership between the Digital Dollar Foundation and Accenture, announced plans to launch five private pilot programs to explore technical models for a potential U.S. CBDC.

On 9 March 2022, President Joe Biden signed an executive order on ensuring responsible development of digital assets.

On 15 November 2022, the Federal Reserve Bank of New York's Innovation Center (NYIC) and several commercial banks launched a 12-week proof-of-concept pilot to test a theoretical Regulated Liability Network (RLN). Operating in a simulated test environment with tokenized deposits and central bank liabilities, the project concluded in July 2023, reporting that a shared multi-entity distributed ledger could support domestic wholesale settlements within current legal frameworks.

On 23 January 2025, President Donald Trump halted the U.S. CBDC project, signing an executive order stipulating that "Except to the extent required by law, agencies are hereby prohibited from undertaking any action to establish, issue, or promote CBDCs within the jurisdiction of the United States or abroad" and "any ongoing plans or initiatives at any agency related to the creation of a CBDC within the jurisdiction of the United States shall be immediately terminated, and no further actions may be taken to develop or implement such plans or initiatives."

== Uruguay ==
In November 2017, the Central Bank of Uruguay announced a pilot program to test the issuance of digital Uruguayan pesos.

== See also ==
- Bakong
- Cashless society
- mBridge
