= Crunchfish =

- Trade name: CFISH
- ISIN: SE0009190192
- Industry: Technology
- Founded: 1 January 2010
- Headquarters: Malmö, Sweden
- Products: Software
- Website: www.crunchfish.com

Crunchfish is a deep tech company developing a Digital Cash platform for Banks, Payment Services and CBDC implementations. Crunchfish is listed on Nasdaq First North Growth Market since 2016, with headquarters in Malmö, Sweden and with subsidiary in India.
