= Ila Patnaik =

Indian economist and journalist

Principal Economic Advisor, Department of Economic Affairs, Ministry of Finance
- In office 1 May 2014 – February 2017
- Prime Minister: Narendra Modi
- Preceded by: Dipak Dasgupta
- Succeeded by: Sanjeev Sanyal

Personal details
- Born: New Delhi, India
- Spouse: Ajay Patnaik
- Children: Megha Patnaik, Ayush Patnaik
- Education: University of Delhi (B.A.); Jawaharlal Nehru University (M.A., M.Phil.); University of Surrey (Ph.D.)
- Occupation: Economist
- Scientific career
- Fields: Open Economy Macroeconomics, Capital Flows, Exchange Rate Regime, Monetary Policy, Business Cycles, Financial Sector (opening of the Capital Account)
- Workplaces: University of Delhi (1987-1991) Indian Institute of Foreign Trade (2004) National Institute of Public Finance and Policy (2006-present)

Ila Patnaik is an Indian economist. and former Principal Economic Advisor to the Government of India. During this time, she prepared the Economic Survey of India, 2013-14 and contributed to numerous Government of India committees and task forces. In 2014, she was the only female economist ranked within the top ten in India, along with the likes of Nobel Laureate Amartya Sen and former RBI governors Y V Reddy, Raghuram Rajan and Urjit Patel. She also writes regular columns for The Indian Express.

Ila Patnaik is the Chief Economist at the Aditya Birla Group, a global conglomerate based in Mumbai. Beyond her corporate role, she is a Director at the LEAP Insights Foundation, a Delhi-based research institution dedicated to improving Indian economic and legal systems through data-driven analysis.

She is also the Co-Founder of AccioPix, an innovative AI-powered photo-sharing platform designed to streamline media delivery through facial recognition technology.

== Education ==
Ila Patnaik has a Bachelor of Arts degree in economics from Hindu College, University of Delhi (1985). She got her master's in economics, along with a master's in philosophy from the Centre of Economic Studies and Planning, Jawaharlal Nehru University (1987 and 1989). While she pursued her undergraduate and graduate studies in India, she decided to pursue her Ph.D. in the United Kingdom, and she graduated with a Ph.D. in economics from University of Surrey in 1996.

== Career ==
Ila Patnaik was an Economics Editor, The Indian Express. She wrote a Fortnightly column in Business Standard. She also worked as Editor, Macro Track, A Quarterly Update on the Indian Economy, NCAER, New Delhi, 1997-2001. Furthermore, Patnaik also was a Senior Economist and a Senior Fellow for National Council of Applied Economic Research (NCAER) and Indian Council for Research in International Economic Relations (1996 - 2002, 2004; 2002 - 2004 respectively). She did a program on NDTV, Policy with Patnaik from 2007 to 2009. And now she is working in ThePrint on weekly shows regarding Indian Economy.

== Research areas and publications ==
Ila Patnaik's main research area is open economy macroeconomics. She has done research in many areas including issues related to capital flows, exchange rate regime, monetary policy, business cycles, and the financial sector (in the context of opening of the capital account). Patnaik has published various papers, books, encyclopedias, and journal articles. Some of her most recent papers and publications include:

- "Ila Patnaik Radhika Pandey, Gurnain K. Pasricha and Ajay Shah. 'Motivations for capital controls and their effectiveness.' Working paper 168, National Institute of Public Finance & Policy, April 2016";
- "Ila Patnaik Rudrani Bhattacharya, Radhika Pandey and Ajay Shah. 'Seasonal adjustment of Indian macroeconomic time-series.' Working Paper 160, National Institute of Public Finance & Policy, January 2016";
- "Ila Patnaik and Ajay Shah. 'Measurement of de-facto exchange rate regimes.' 2014";
- "Rudrani Bhattacharya and Ila Patnaik. 'Forecasting and monetary policy analysis in emerging economies: The case of India.' Working Paper 131, National Institute of Public Finance & Policy, February 2014", etc.

== Awards ==
Among the multiple awards given to Patnaik are "Junior Science Talent Scholarship" (1978), "National Talent Search Scholarship" (1980), "Junior Research Fellowship for Economics" (1987), and "British Nehru Centenary Fellowship for Doctoral study in Economics in the UK" (1991).
