= Congressional Blockchain Caucus =

United States caucus

The Congressional Blockchain Caucus is a bipartisan group of U.S. Representatives and staff. The caucus was founded during the 114th United States Congress to be a platform for industry and government to study and understand blockchain technology, and the role Congress can play in its development.

== History ==
The Congressional Blockchain Caucus was formed in September 26, 2016, to study blockchain technology. The Congressional Blockchain Caucus was formed by Jared Polis, a Democratic congressman from Colorado, and Mick Mulvaney, a Republican representing South Carolina.

On March 24, 2019, seven congressmen sent a letter to Larry Kudlow, the director of the National Economic Council. The letter requested that the administration have a forum on blockchain technology and initiate blockchain technology. The signers of the letter were congressmen Trey Hollingsworth, Darren Soto, Bill Foster, Tom Emmer, Ted Budd, Josh Gottheimer and David Schweikert.

In March 2021, Representatives Darren Soto (D-FL) and Warren Davidson (R-OH) reintroduced the Token Taxonomy Act. The bill's co-sponsors are Ted Budd (R-NC), Scott Perry (R-PA) and Josh Gottheimer (D-NJ).

In a press release dated June 16, 2021, Congresswoman Maxine Waters, chairwoman of the U.S. House Committee on Financial Services, announced the formation of a Digital Assets Working Group for Democratic members of Congress. Bill Foster (D-IL), who is Chair of the Task Force on Artificial Intelligence and a co-founder of the Congressional Blockchain Group, is a member of this new Digital Assets Working Group. The Congressional Blockchain Caucus focuses on cryptocurrency policy.

== Purpose ==
The caucus was formed to be a platform for industry and government to study and understand blockchain technology.

== Co-Chairs ==
- Tom Emmer (R‑MN‑6)
- David Schweikert (R‑AZ‑1)
- Darren Soto (D‑FL‑9)
- Bill Foster (D‑IL‑11)

== Members ==
Congressional Blockchain Caucus in the 117th United States Congress

- Congressman Jake Auchincloss (D‑MA‑4)
- Congressman Don Beyer (D‑VA‑8)
- Congresswoman Lauren Boebert (R‑CO‑3)
- Congresswoman Kat Cammack (R‑FL‑3)
- Congressman Buddy Carter (R‑GA‑1)
- Congressman Troy Carter (D‑LA‑2)
- Congressman John Curtis (R‑UT‑3)
- Congressman Warren Davidson (R‑OH‑8)
- Congressman Byron Donalds (R‑FL‑19)
- Congressman Jeff Duncan (R‑SC‑3)
- Congressman Josh Gottheimer (D‑NJ‑5)
- Congressman Bill Huizenga (R‑MI‑4)
- Congressman Ro Khanna (D‑CA‑17)
- Congressman Raja Krishnamoorthi (D‑IL‑8)
- Congressman John Larson (D‑CT‑1)
- Congressman Mike Levin (D‑CA‑49)
- Congressman Frank Lucas (R‑OK‑3)
- Congressman Stephen F. Lynch (D‑MA‑8)
- Congresswoman Nancy Mace (R‑SC‑1)
- Congressman Ralph Norman (R‑SC‑5)
- Congresswoman Stacey Plaskett (D‑VI‑AL)
- Congresswoman Maria Salazar (R‑FL‑27)
- Congressman Bryan Steil (R‑WI‑1)
- Congressman Glenn Thompson (R‑PA‑15)
- Congressman Ritchie Torres (D‑NY‑15)
- Congressman Michael Waltz (R‑FL‑6)
- Congressman Rob Wittman (R‑VA‑1)

== See also ==
- CBSCs by country
- Government by algorithm
