= Project Cedar =

Project Cedar may refer to:

- Operation Cedar, a World War II project to deliver short-aircraft from the US to the USSR via Iran
- Project Cedar (DEA), a 2016 international law enforcement to dismantle a drug trafficking and money laundering network
- Project Cedar, a 2023 research initiative to evaluate applications of wholesale central bank digital currencies as part of the MBridge project
