= Britcoin =

Britcoin may refer to:

- A crypto-currency exchange founded by Amir Taaki
- The Digital pound, a proposed digital currency to be issued by the Bank of England
