= Digital renminbi =

Digital currency issued by China's central bank

Digital Currency Electronic Payment 数字货币电子支付
e-CNY
- Digital Renminbi / e Yuan Sign

ISO 4217
- Code: CNY (numeric: 156)
- Subunit: 0.01

Units of account
- Base unit: yuán (元 / 圆)
- Plural: The language(s) of this currency do(es) not have a morphological plural distinction.
- Symbol: or e¥ / ¥
- Nickname: Digital renminbi (数字人民币)
- Subunit
- 1/10: jiǎo (角)
- 1/100: fēn (分)

Demographics
- Date of introduction: 14 August 2020; 6 years ago
- Official user(s): China (Mainland China); Shenzhen, Suzhou, Xiong'an, Chengdu, Beijing, Zhangjiakou, Shanghai, Hainan, Changsha, Xi'an, Qingdao, Dalian, Fuzhou, Xiamen, Guangzhou, Tianjin, Chongqing, Hangzhou, Ningbo, Wenzhou, Huzhou, Shaoxing, Jinhua, Jinan, Nanning, Kunming, Fangchenggang, Xishuangbanna
- Unofficial users: Hong Kong; Macau (pilot test)

Issuance
- Central bank: People's Bank of China
- Website: www.pbc.gov.cn
- Printer: People's Bank of China Digital Currency Research Institute
- Website: www.ecny.pbcdci.cn

Valuation
- Inflation: 2.5% (2017)
- Pegged with: Chinese renminbi (at par)
- Value: 1 USD = 7.171 eCNY; 1 EUR = 6.960 eCNY; 1 CNY = 1.000 eCNY; 1 GBP = 7.946 eCNY (12 October 2022)

Digital renminbi (Chinese: 数字人民币; also abbreviated as digital RMB and e-CNY), or Digital Currency Electronic Payment (DCEP, Chinese: 数字货币电子支付; pinyin: Shùzì huòbì diànzǐ zhīfù), is a central bank digital currency issued by China's central bank, the People's Bank of China. It is the first digital currency to be issued by a major economy, undergoing public testing as of April 2021. The digital RMB is legal tender and has equivalent value to other forms of renminbi, also known as the Chinese yuan (CNY), such as bills and coins.

The digital yuan is designed to move instantaneously in both domestic and international transactions. It aims to be cheaper and faster than existing financial transactions. The technology enables transactions to take place between two offline devices.

The digital renminbi is seen by some commentators as a form of Chinese government surveillance and control over users and their financial transactions.

== History ==
=== Research and development ===
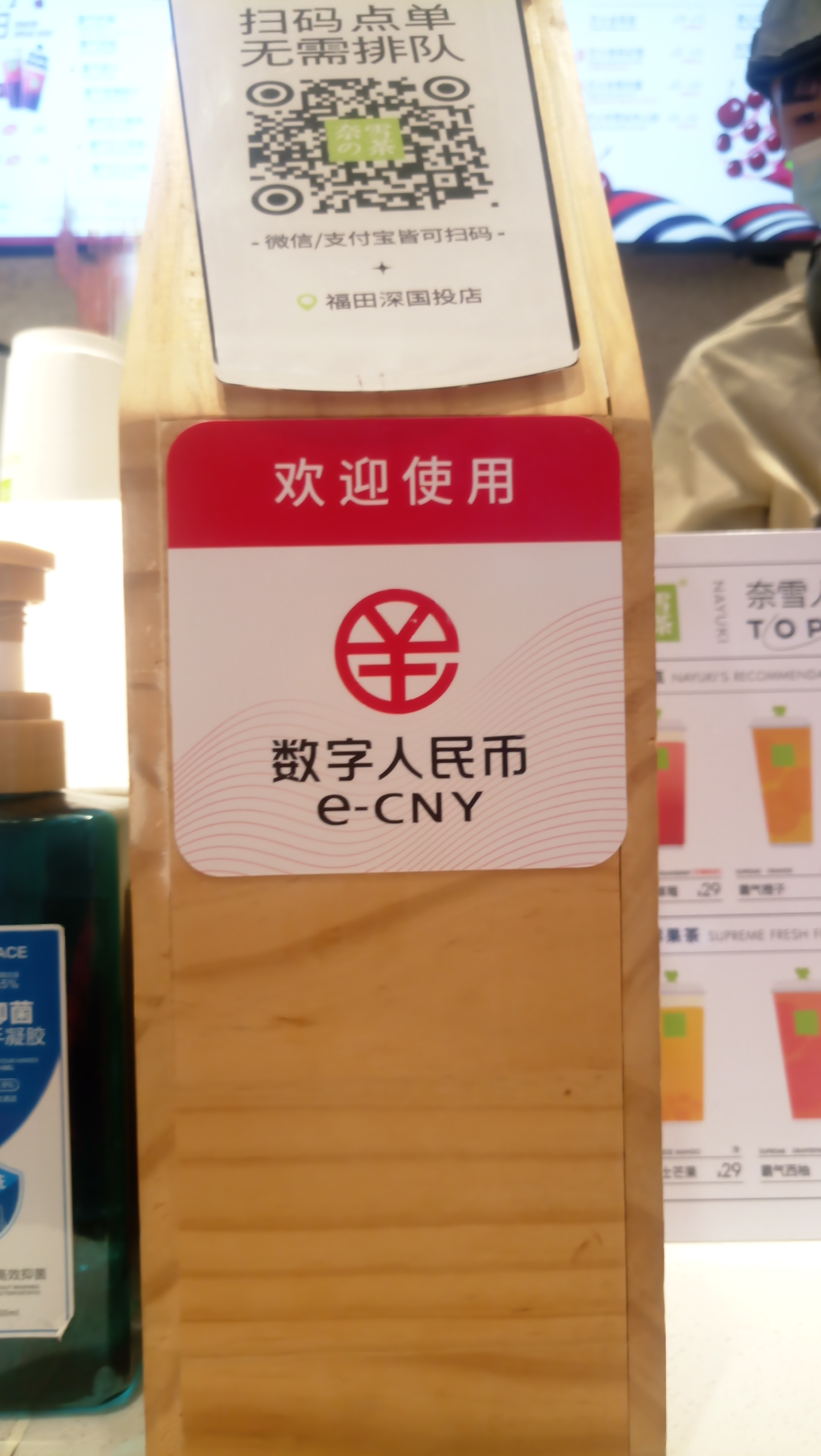
A sign showing that a store accepts digital RMB in Shenzhen, Guangdong

China's central bank, the People's Bank of China (PBOC), began research on the digital currency in 2014 under the leadership of Governor Zhou Xiaochuan. In 2016, Fan Yifei, a deputy governor of the PBOC, wrote that "the conditions are ripe for digital currencies, which can reduce operating costs, increase efficiency and enable a wide range of new applications". According to Fan, the best way to take advantage of the situation is for central banks to take the lead, both in supervising private digital currencies and in developing digital legal tender of their own.

In 2017, the State Council approved the development of the digital RMB, in partnership with commercial banks and other organizations. Chinese technology firms such as Alibaba (through its affiliate Ant Group), Tencent (which owns WeChat), Huawei, JD.com and UnionPay were invited to cooperate with the central bank in developing and testing the digital RMB. In 2017, the State Council authorized the development of a digital RMB (e-CNY), and well-known tech firms from China, including Alibaba's Ant Group, were involved in PBOC research and pilots, including banks and other financial institutions. China's State Council created a development work on a digital version of renminbi and the People's Bank of China eventually brought commercial banks and selected technology firms to support research and pilot testing. Ant Group which is an affiliate of Alibaba was one of the private sector firms reported to be involved. Its role appears to have been mainly technical and it worked with People's Bank of China since 2017, while MYbank also participated in the e-CNY research and pilot trials. Reports say that People's Bank of China and Ant also cooperated on specific technical infrastructure that was used to develop the digital renminbi. Although Alibaba.com has not adopted digital renminbi, Kuo Zhang, president of Alibaba.com has publicly discussed the platform's plan to introduce tokenized bank deposits for cross-border business-to-business payments.According to a CNBC report, Zhang said Alibaba.com was looking at US dollar and Euro tokenized deposits with possible support from JP Morgan's technology to reduce intermediaries and accelerate settlement.The technology would use stablecoin-like technology to make global payments. The system was referred to as agentic pay where the site's AI will be able to automatically create contracts between buyer and seller, which previously were humanly created and uploaded to the site.

Ant backed MYbank, and Ant/Alipay participated in trials and technical cooperation with the Digital Currency Research Institute, which allowed the central bank pilot access to Alibaba's larger user base. The pilot aimed to provide an alternative retail payment rail alongside Alipay and WeChat Pay, and Ant and Tencent played roles in the trial distribution and integration with digital wallets. Most recently, there have been rollouts between operator banks and digital bank participants, including MYbank and WeBank.

In October 2019, the PBOC announced that a digital renminbi would be released after years of preparation. The version of the currency, known as DCEP (Digital Currency Electronic Payment), requires an account with a commercial bank, but may be "decoupled" from the banking system in the future, allowing tourists to gain access to the system.

=== Testing ===
==== 2020 ====
In April 2020, testing began in four cities around China (Shenzhen, Suzhou, Chengdu and Xiong'an) to improve the currency's functionality. Areas of testing include the currency's reliability, stability, ease of use, and regulatory concerns such as the prevention of money laundering, tax evasion and terror financing. The currency could be transferred to bank accounts or used directly with certain merchants, and could be controlled via apps on one's smartphone. As of April 2021, more than 100,000 have downloaded such apps, which were developed by banks, including six state-owned banks. The digital currency could be spent in stores like Starbucks and McDonald's in China, as well as online shopping platforms like JD.com. Local governments, partnering with private businesses, have distributed more than 150 million RMB as an incentive to attract test users of digital RMB and to stimulate consumption.

On 12 October 2020, 50,000 lottery winners in Shenzhen's Luohu district were each given 200 digital yuan that were programmed to expire on 18 October 2020. The goal of the experiment was to boost consumer spending and test the currency and technology.

==== 2021 ====
As of April 2021, testing has been expanded to six additional regions: Shanghai, Hainan, Changsha, Xi'an, Qingdao and Dalian.

In June 2021, some Chinese cities expanded the use of e-CNY in public transportation. Chengdu was the first to fully integrate e-CNY payments across all buses and subway lines. This was part of a larger pilot to test the digital currency in daily transactions. Later, Beijing and Suzhou also implemented e-CNY for public transport, with Beijing enabling it on all 24 subway lines and Suzhou on its new Line 5.

At the end of 2021, there were 261 million users in the extended trial who had made US$13.8 billion of transactions It has also been rolled out for foreign attendees at the 2022 Winter Olympics in Beijing, where it has seen limited use due to entrenched digital currencies and Visa, as well as a lack of publicity.

==== 2022 ====
On March 31, 2022, People's Bank of China announced that the testing has been further expanded to six additional regions: Tianjin, Chongqing, Guangzhou, Fuzhou, Xiamen, and six cities in the province of Zhejiang that are hosting the 2022 Asian Games (Hangzhou, Ningbo, Wenzhou, Huzhou, Shaoxing, and Jinhua). Another news statement from PBOC shows that the cities of Beijing and Zhangjiakou are also being included on the list of testing after the 2022 Winter Olympics.

On December 16, 2022, the testing of Digital renminbi has been further expanded into five additional regions: Jinan, Fangchenggang, Nanning, Kunming, and Xishuangbanna.

==== 2023 ====
From May 2023, Changshu in the province of Jiangsu started to roll out salary payments in e-CNY for government employees as well as staff at state-owned companies and public institutions.

On July 11, 2023, Bank of China, China Telecom, and China Unicom announced the joint launch of SIM card-based e-CNY wallets, which allow offline payments using the SIM's NFC function.

In October 2023, digital yuan was first used in the cross-border crude oil settlement by PetroChina, the listed arm of China National Petroleum Corporation (CNPC).

==== 2026 ====
The People’s Bank of China (PBOC) has unveiled The Action Plan for Further Strengthening the Digital Yuan Management Service System and Related Financial Infrastructure Construction (the “Action Plan”) (《关于进一步加强数字人民币管理服务体系和相关金融基础设施建设的行动方案》), which took effect on 1 January 2026. The Action Plan lays down a new generation of digital yuan measurement framework, management system, operational mechanism and ecosystem.

== e-CNY wallet specifications ==
An e-CNY wallet, which serves as a tool to store digital renminbi and make transactions, possesses four distinct specifications as revealed by the central Bank of China.

Wallet limits
The wallet with the highest level of anonymity needs only a mobile number for activation. It has a 2,000 yuan single payment limit, a daily cumulative limit of 5,000 yuan, and a 10,000 yuan balance cap.

A wallet verified with an ID card and linked to a bank account has a 50,000 yuan single payment limit, a daily cumulative limit of 100,000 yuan, and a balance cap of 500,000 yuan.

Personal and corporate wallets
Individuals and individual business owners can open personal wallets, with transaction and balance limits determined by the levels of their identity verification. Legal entities and non-legal entities can open corporate wallets, with transaction and balance limits contingent on whether the account is opened in person or remotely.

Soft and hard wallets
Soft wallets encompass mobile payment apps and services provided through software development kits (SDKs). Hard wallets include IC cards, wearable devices, and Internet of Things (IoT) devices.

Master and sub-wallets
Wallet holders have the option to designate an e-CNY wallet as the master wallet and create multiple sub-wallets within it. Master wallet holders are allowed to implement payment limits and conditions for the sub-wallets, and protect their privacy.

== Goals ==
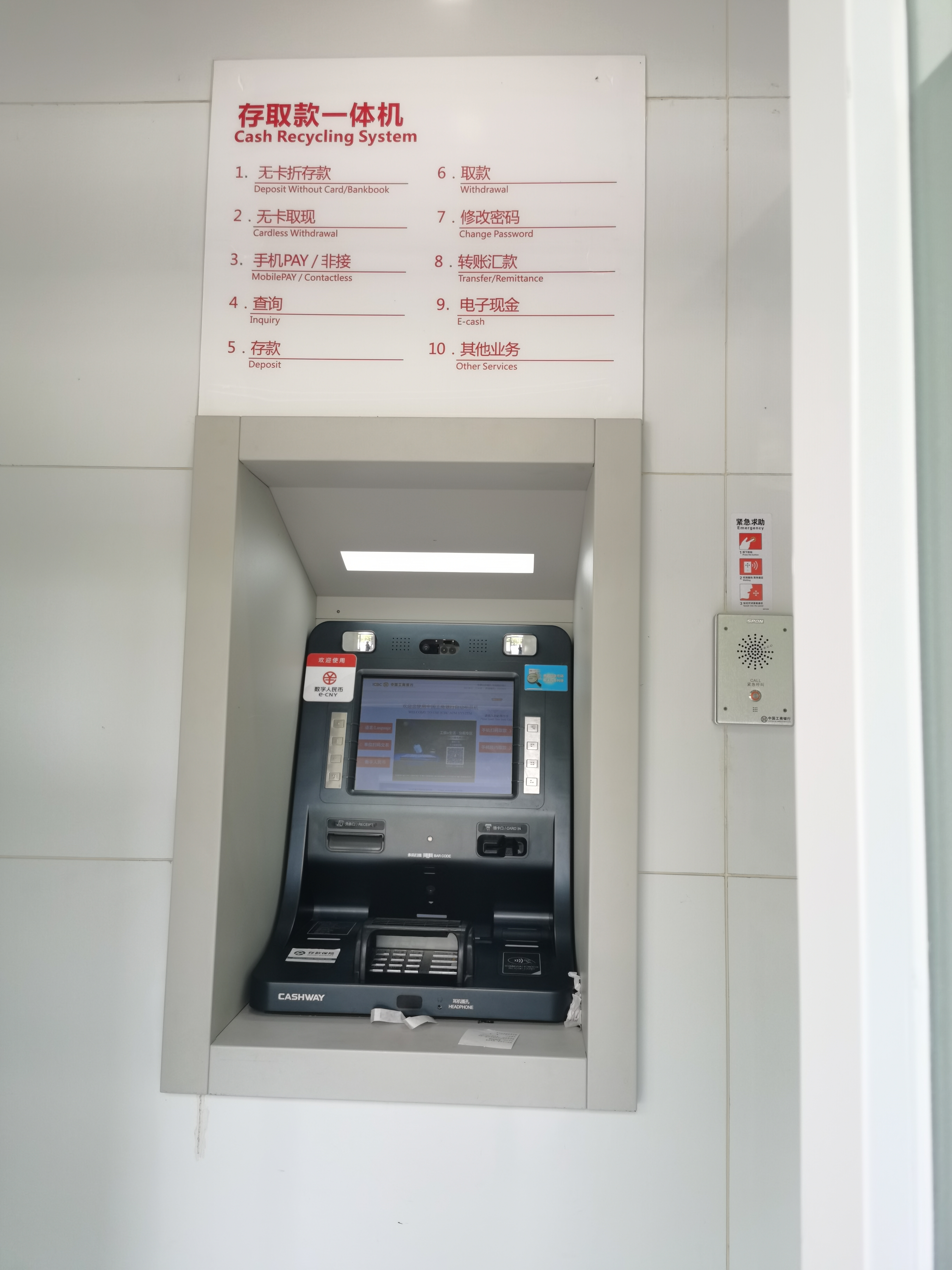
An ATM supporting digital RMB

The PBOC has stated that the goal of launching digital RMB is to partially replace cash, but not bank deposits or privately run payment platforms. The bank claimed that digital RMB could be used to reduce money laundering, gambling, corruption and terror financing, and may improve the efficiency of financial transactions. The central bank also stated that it would limit how it tracks individuals, through the so-called "controllable anonymity." Critics say that the currency will give the Chinese government a new tool to monitor its people and financial transactions. In 2020, non-cash transactions represented 4 out of 5 payment transactions totaling a sum of 320 trillion yuan.

Li Bo, deputy governor of the PBOC, stated that the "goal is not to replace the U.S. dollar or other international currencies".

== Effects ==
=== On digital payment platforms ===
According to World Bank data, in 2017, almost 20% of Chinese people over 15 did not hold a bank account. As of February 2021, 87% of the population have access to fintech apps such as WeChat Pay and Alipay, which together account for more than 90% of electronic payments in China as of 2021.

Chinese fintech apps have largely leapfrogged traditional card-based payment networks in China, due to the fintech apps' ease of use and much cheaper fees for merchants. Transfers within WeChat Pay and Alipay are free within their respective ecosystems, and generally have a 0.1% fee for transfers outside their ecosystem, much lower than the 2–4% fee imposed by credit cards. WeChat Pay and Alipay each have over a billion users in China, and are used by over 90% of the population in China's largest cities as their preferred payment method. The digital yuan might sideline these private digital payment platforms.

=== Internationally ===
The digital RMB could provide a cheaper and more practical alternative to international transactions that are outside the U.S.-led global financial system, especially for countries with strong ties to China. Private companies like Alibaba.com's use of tokenized banks deposits for B2B trade payments, show efforts to decrease dependence on intermediaries and increase settlement outside traditional banking channels.It is feared by U.S. commentators and officials that the digital RMB would weaken the ability of the U.S. to monitor and control the global financial system, through "dollar weaponization," such as sanctions and through its intelligence access to the SWIFT payment system.

=== Reactions ===
Some commentators have said that the U.S., which has only started to consider issuing a government-backed digital currency, risks falling behind China and weakening its dominance in the global financial system. The digital renminbi has been described as a "national-security issue" threatening the US dollar by Josh Lipsky at the Atlantic Council think tank. It is also seen by commentators as a tool to allow Chinese authorities to keep domestic control and surveillance capabilities.

Some argue that the real barriers to internationalisation of the renminbi are China's capital controls, which it has no plans to remove. Maximilian Kärnfelt, an expert at the Mercator Institute for China Studies, said that a digital renminbi "would not banish many of the problems holding the renminbi back from more use globally". He went on to say, "Much of China's financial market is still not open to foreigners and property rights remain fragile." Victor Shih, a China expert and professor at the University of California, San Diego, said that merely introducing a digital currency "doesn't solve the problem that some people holding renminbi offshore will want to sell that renminbi and exchange it for the dollar", as the dollar is considered to be a safer asset. Eswar Prasad, an economics professor at Cornell University, said that the digital renminbi "will hardly put a dent in the dollar's status as the dominant global reserve currency" due to the United States' "economic dominance, deep and liquid capital markets, and still-robust institutional framework". As of 2020, the U.S. dollar's share as a reserve currency was above 60%, while that of the renminbi was about 2%.

U.S. Treasury Secretary Janet Yellen and Federal Reserve Chairman Jerome Powell have said that they are studying the effects of digital currencies like the digital RMB and how they will affect the U.S. dollar.

The EU is also considering issuing a digital euro. According to Clingendael Institute, digital currencies such as the digital yuan threaten the growing position of the euro as an alternative to the dollar.

== See also ==
- Central bank digital currency
- History of central bank digital currencies by country
- Digital Rupee
- Belt and Road Initiative
- Internationalization of the renminbi
- Social Credit System
