= ENaira =

Nigerian Central bank Digital currency

eNaira is a central bank digital currency issued and regulated by the Central Bank of Nigeria. It was the first of its type in Africa. Denominated in naira, the eNaira serves as both a medium of exchange and store of value and claims to offer better payment prospects in retail transactions when compared to cash.

The eNaira was launched and activated on 25 October 2021 by President Muhammadu Buhari, under the slogan "Same Naira, More Possibilities".

== Adoption ==
Takeup has been sluggish. Fewer than 0.5% of Nigerians were using the eNaira within a year of its launch, despite discounts to encourage adoption. As of 2024, most wallets are reportedly inactive. Barriers include weak technology infrastructure, unreliable electricity, the lack of training for financial employees, anxieties about data privacy and financial crime, low trust in government, and the exclusion of people without existing bank accounts.

== See also ==
- Central bank digital currency
- Digital currency
- Digital renminbi
- Digital rupee
