= Li Bo (economist) =

Chinese economist

Li Bo (Chinese: 李波; also known as Bo Li) is a Chinese economist and financial official who served as a deputy governor of the People’s Bank of China in 2021, before moving to the International Monetary Fund as a Deputy Managing Director later that year.

== Early life and education ==
Li studied international economics at Renmin University of China. He got a PhD in economics at Stanford University and holds a J.D. from Harvard Law School.

== Career ==
Li worked at the PBOC for many years from the mid-2000s, including leadership positions in the Monetary Policy departments. He also served in municipal government as a vice mayor of Chongqing.

On 13 April 2021, China named Li Bo as one of the deputy governors of the PBOC under Yi Gang.

On 28 June 2021, the IMF announced that Managing Director Kristalina Georgieva had proposed the appointment of Bo Li as Deputy Managing Director, with effect from 23 August 2021.
