= Central bank digital currency =

Digital form of fiat money

A central bank digital currency (CBDC) is a digital version of an official currency, created by a central bank rather than by private companies. Unlike cryptocurrencies such as Bitcoin, CBDCs are issued by a state and may work alongside physical cash. As of 2024, the Bahamas, Jamaica, and Nigeria have launched CBDCs, and 134 countries are researching their own versions while other jurisdictions, such as Florida, have banned CBDCs citing privacy concerns.

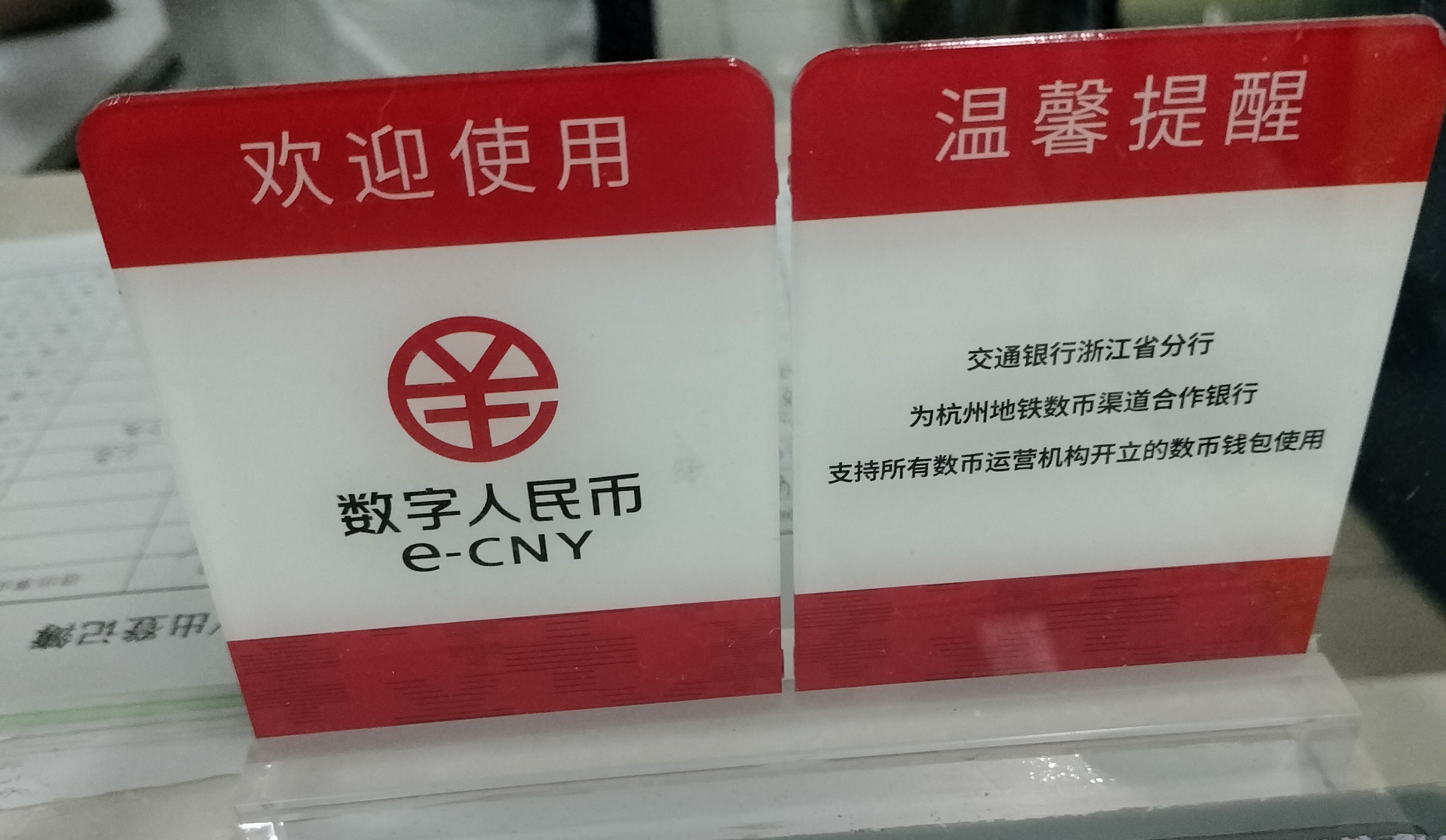
A sign on the Hangzhou Metro advertising acceptance of the digital renminbi, the first CBDC adopted by a major economy (China)

CBDCs could enable faster, cheaper payments and improve financial inclusion, but raise concerns about privacy and the potential for them to be used as a "tool for coercion and control". CBDC implementation could affect banks' financial stability, requiring careful policy design.

== History ==
Although the term "CBDC" did not become widely used until after 2019, central banks have researched and launched digital currency projects for decades. For example, Finland's central bank issued the Avant stored value e-money card in the 1990s. In 2014, the People's Bank of China began researching the idea of issuing a CBDC. Elsewhere, the Ecuadorian central bank operated a mobile payment system from 2014 to 2018. In 2021, Australia's central bank conducted a proof of concept for a wholesale CBDC using Ethereum to tokenize syndicated loans, aiming to automate and secure high-value transactions in the banking sector.

== Implementation ==
A central bank digital currency would likely be implemented using a database run by the central bank, government, or approved private-sector entities. The database would keep a record (with appropriate privacy and cryptographic protections) of the amount of money held by every entity, such as people and corporations.

CBDCs may share some properties with virtual currency and cryptocurrency, such as programmability. In contrast to cryptocurrency, a central bank digital currency would be centrally controlled (even if it was on a distributed database), and so a blockchain or other distributed ledger would likely not be required or useful - even though they were the original inspiration for the concept.

The two primary categories of CBDCs are retail and wholesale. Retail CBDCs are designed for households and businesses to make payments for everyday transactions, whereas wholesale CBDCs are designed for financial institutions and operate similarly to central bank reserves. Retail CBDC is the digitization of sovereign currency, which applies to physical banknotes, coin, and existing wholesale CBDC reserves that are used in the reverse repo and repo market.

Retail CBDCs can be distributed through various models. In the intermediated model, the central bank issues the CBDC and manages core infrastructures, while financial intermediaries offer customer services. The ECB and the Federal Reserve have proposed intermediated CBDCs. Alternatively, the central bank could either provide the full service or delegate responsibilities further.

As it currently stands, 9 countries and the 8 islands making up the Eastern Caribbean Currency Union have launched CBDCs; 38 countries and Hong Kong have CBDC pilot programmes; and 67 countries and 2 currency unions are researching CBDCs. In the United States, some states have introduced legislation to ban state payments using CBDCs with Florida being the first state to pass such a law citing privacy concerns. In June 2026, the United States Congress passed the 21st Century ROAD to Housing Act, section 1101 prohibits the Fed from issuing "digital asset that ... is a direct liability of the Federal Reserve System; and is widely available to the general public".

By March 2024, the central banks of 134 countries accounting for 98% of the world's GDP were said to be in various stages of evaluating the launch of a national digital currency. These included the ECB, the UK, and the US. China's digital RMB was the first digital currency to be issued by a major economy. Six central banks have launched a CBDC: the Central Bank of The Bahamas (Sand Dollar), the Eastern Caribbean Central Bank (DCash), the Central Bank of Nigeria (e-Naira), the Bank of Jamaica (JamDex), People's Bank of China (Digital renminbi), the Reserve Bank of India (Digital Rupee), and Bank of Russia (Digital Ruble). The Central Bank of Brazil has been rolling out tests of a digital Brazilian currency (Drex) since March 2023. The ECB/Eurozone decided in October 2023 to move forward to the preparation phase for the potential issuance of a digital euro after a two-year study phase.

In the USA, the Republican Party is generally against CBDCs. The Swedish Rikstag has been unsympathetic to the Riksbank's enthusiasm for a CBDC. Ukraine focused on the risk of disintermediating commercial banks back in 2020. The Polish National Bank is opposed to a CBDC.

Some states have also issued, or have considered issuing, cryptocurrencies: these include Venezuela (Petro) and the Marshall Islands (Sovereign). These cryptocurrencies are often considered with the intent of increasing a state's independence from global financial systems, such as by reducing dependence on a foreign currency or by evading international sanctions.

Contrasting attitudes towards digital currencies were demonstrated by developments in the UK and Switzerland in February 2023. The UK Treasury and the Bank of England said a state-backed digital pound was likely to be launched some time after 2025. Two weeks later, a Swiss lobby group triggered a national vote on maintaining a "sufficient quantity" of cash in circulation over fears that electronic payments make it easier for the state to monitor its citizens' actions. In a comment on the British government's plans, the BBC's Faisal Islam said the issue was about access to the data attached to every spending transaction, and whether people might choose to trust a global company more than the state: "The eye here is on maintaining UK monetary sovereignty against upheaval from the likes of Big Tech."

A major issue with central bank digital currencies is deciding whether the currency should be easily traceable. If it's traceable, the government has more control than it currently does. Additionally, there's a technical aspect to consider: whether CBDCs should be based on tokens or accounts and how much anonymity users should have.

== Characteristics ==
A CBDC is a digital counterpart to fiat money, issued by central banks, unless it is dividend-yielding; then, it is an ownership stake in the central bank and a new form of legal tender. Like paper banknotes, it is a means of payment, a unit of account, and a store of value. And like paper currency, each unit is uniquely identifiable to prevent counterfeiting.

Digital fiat currency is part of the base money supply, together with other forms of the currency. As such, DFC is a liability of the central bank just as physical currency is. It is a digital bearer instrument that can be stored, transferred and transmitted by all kinds of digital payment systems and services. The validity of the digital fiat currency is independent of the digital payment systems storing and transferring the digital fiat currency.

Proposals for CBDC implementation often involve the provision of universal bank accounts at the central banks for all citizens.

== Benefits and impacts ==
Governments and central banks are studying CBDCs and their implications for financial inclusion, economic growth, technology innovation, and the efficiency of bank transactions. CBDCs have also been discussed as a mechanism to preserve public access to central bank money in an increasingly digital economy and to maintain trust in the monetary system. Potential advantages include:

- Technological efficiency: instead of relying on intermediaries such as banks and clearing houses, money transfers and payments could be made in real time, directly from the payer to the payee. Being real time has some advantages:
  - Reduces risk: payment for goods and services often needs to be done in a timely manner and when payment verification is slow, merchants usually accept the risk of some payments not succeeding in exchange for faster service to customers. When these risks are eliminated with instant payment verifications, merchants no longer need to use intermediaries to handle the risk or to absorb the risk cost themselves.
  - Reduces complexity: merchants will not need to separately keep track of transactions that are slow (where the customer claims to have paid but the money has not arrived yet), therefore eliminate the waiting queue, which could simplify the transaction process from payment to rendition of goods/services.
  - Reduces (or eliminates) transaction fees: current payment systems like Visa, Mastercard, American Express etc. have a fee attached to each transaction and lowering or eliminating these fees could lead to widespread price drops and increased adoption of digital payments.
- Financial inclusion: safe money accounts at the central banks could constitute a strong instrument of financial inclusion, allowing any legal resident or citizen to be provided with a free or low-cost basic bank account.
- Preventing illicit activity: A CBDC makes it feasible for a central bank to keep track of the exact location of every unit of the currency (assuming the more probable centralized, database form)
  - Tax collection: It makes tax avoidance and tax evasion much more difficult, since it would become impossible to use methods such as offshore banking and unreported employment to hide financial activity from the central bank or government. In contrast, cryptocurrencies risk undermining effort to crack down on corporate tax avoidance.
  - Combating crime: It makes it much easier to spot criminal activity (by observing financial activity), and thus put an end to it. Furthermore, in cases where criminal activity has already occurred, tracking makes it much harder to successfully launder money, and it would often be straightforward to instantly reverse a transaction and return money to the victim of the crime.
- Proof of transaction: a digital record exists to prove that money changed hands between two parties which avoids problems inherent to cash such as short-changing, cash theft and conflicting testimonies.
- Protection of money as a public utility: digital currencies issued by central banks would provide a modern alternative to physical cash – whose abolition is currently being envisaged.
- Safety of payments systems: A secure and standard interoperable digital payment instrument issued and governed by a Central Bank and used as the national digital payment instruments boosts confidence in privately controlled money systems and increases trust in the entire national payment system while also boosting competition in payment systems.
- Preservation of seigniorage income: public digital currency issuance would avoid a predictable reduction of seigniorage income for governments in the event of a disappearance of physical cash.
- Banking competition: the provision of free bank accounts at the central bank offering complete safety of money deposits could strengthen competition between banks to attract bank deposits, for example by offering once again remunerated sight deposits.
- Monetary policy transmission: the issuance of central bank base money through transfers to the public could constitute a new channel for monetary policy transmission (i.e. helicopter money), which would allow more direct control of the money supply than indirect tools such as quantitative easing and interest rates, and possibly lead the way towards a full reserve banking system. In digital Yuan trial in Shenzhen, the CBDC was programmed with an expiration date, which encouraged spending and discouraged money from sitting in a saving account. In the end, 90% of vouchers were spent in shops. Demurrage currency could be implemented, perhaps by shaving off fractions of the value on a scheduled basis, as a supplement to traditional inflation targets.
- Financial safety: CBDC would provide an alternative to fractional reserve banking for daily uses, for those who want to avoid all risk of bank runs, despite the relative safety provided by deposit insurance.

== Criticism ==
Despite having potential advantages, CBDCs remain a controversial topic, and there are risks associated with their implementation.

- Banking system disintermediation: With the ability to provide digital currency directly to its citizens, one concern is that depositors would shift out of the banking system. Customers may deem the safety, liquidity, solvency, and publicity of CBDCs to be more attractive. In the extreme, this could precipitate potential bank runs and thus make banks' funding positions weaker. However, the Bank of England found that if the introduction of CBDC follows a set of core principles, the risk of a system-wide run from bank deposits to CBDC is addressed. A central bank could also limit the demand of CBDCs by setting a ceiling on the amount of holdings.
- Centralization: Since most central bank digital currencies are centralized, rather than decentralized like most cryptocurrencies, the controllers of the issuance of CBDCs can add or remove money from anyone's account with a flip of a switch.
- Digital dollarization: A well-run foreign digital currency could become a replacement for a local currency for the same reasons as those described in dollarization. The announcement of Facebook's Libra contributed to the increased attention to CBDCs by central bankers, as well as China's progress with DCEP to that of several Asian economies.
- Privacy:
  - "Governments have direct visibility of financial transactions", an "eagle-eyed view on the spending of everyone".
  - Digital currency would give a country "broad new powers when it comes to surveillance and controlling its population."
  - Data from tracing money routes could lead to losing financial privacy if the CBDC implementation does not have adequate privacy protections. This could lead to encouraging of self-censorship, deterioration of freedom of expression and association, and ultimately to stalling social developments.
- Cybersecurity: Cybersecurity is an important risk to any payment infrastructure. While CBDCs offer resiliency by providing a new payment method, they would also represent a critical infrastructure, potentially making them a high-value target for cyber attacks.
- Government social manipulation:
  - Digital currency "will simply become an extension of the surveillance state" and "it could see citizens fined in a split second for behaviors deemed undesirable. Dissidents and activists could see their wallets emptied or taken offline."
  - Limiting individual freedom: "Digital currencies could also empower the state to make it impossible to donate to a vocal NGO"
  - Limiting or prohibiting purchases of products: Digital currency could prohibit a "purchase alcohol on a weekday. "
  - Digital currency "is also programmable. The government could theoretically give out money that expires within a certain period of time or money that could only be used on certain items, which could be used to induce behaviour that the government is seeking."

According to American policy analyst, Avik Roy, CBDCs inherently expand government control, conflict with American privacy norms, and, in his view, regulated stablecoins can provide similar digital benefits with stronger privacy protections, leading him to oppose adopting a CBDC.

== See also ==
- Central bank digital currencies by country
- Bank for International Settlements
- Digital euro
- Digital renminbi
- Digital ruble
- Digital rupee
- E-Cedi
- ENaira
- Inflation targeting
- mBridge
- M-Pesa
- Zero lower bound
