= Project Hangang =

South Korean banking initiative

Project Hangang (Korean: 프로젝트 한강) is a digital deposit pilot project jointly conducted by the Bank of Korea and South Korean banks.

== Overview ==
Project Hangang is a blockchain-based digital currency experiment jointly built and operated by the Bank of Korea and banks. From the perspective of financial consumers, the service can be utilized by creating a dedicated digital currency wallet—separate from regular deposits—on participating banks' apps for payments and remittances. In other words, unlike existing cash-based deposits, the money placed in the digital wallet is digital South Korean won issued and circulated on a blockchain established by the BOK and the banks.

This is a type of hybrid system in which the central bank supplies wholesale Central Bank Digital Currency (CBDC) to banks, and the banks then create digital currency usable by the general public based on it to provide services. Yoon Sung-kwan, head of the BOK Digital Currency Division, stated that Project Hangang is the world's first case of implementing an integrated ledger involving a central bank in actual transactions.

== History ==
Phase 1 of the project ran from October 2023 to August 2025. It involved 81,000 consumers and participating merchants such as 7-Eleven, Hanaro Mart, Ediya Coffee, and Kyobo Book Centre. There were criticisms that it was cumbersome to use compared to cards and various payment services, and actual usage was low, totaling 114,880 transactions, which did not exceed two per person.

On March 18, 2026, the BOK announced plans to launch Phase 2, which expands the number of participating banks and services compared to Phase 1. Automatic top-up and biometric authentication are also scheduled to be introduced, and the bank stated that it would also introduce a new service to pay government treasury funds in digital currency.

BOK Governor Hyun-Song Shin stated at the 2026 European Central Bank Forum on Central Banking that the ultimate future of money lies in tokenizing assets in addition to central bank money and deposits. During a session on the tokenization of money, payments, and financial transactions, he presented a paper containing the experiences and implications of Project Hangang.
