= MBridge =

Banking platform

mBridge (a.k.a. Multiple CBDC Bridge) is a multiple central bank digital currency platform developed to support real-time, peer-to-peer, cross-border payments and foreign exchange transactions using CBDCs. Based on a blockchain called the mBridge Ledger, the platform is designed to ensure compliance with jurisdiction-specific policy and legal requirements, regulations, and governance needs.

Currently four entities are jointly developing mBridge. They are the Hong Kong Monetary Authority, the Bank of Thailand, the Central Bank of the United Arab Emirates, and the Digital Currency Research Institute of the People's Bank of China. The Bank for International Settlements Hong Kong Centre ended its involvement in 2024, while the Saudi Central Bank left the project in 2026, both under pressure from the Trump administration.

== Development ==
A pilot involving real corporate transactions was conducted on the platform among participating central banks, selected commercial banks, and their customers in four jurisdictions. The project focused on developing hypothetical use cases in the Greater Bay Area as a way to demonstrate the technology and operational improvements that mBridge can offer.

In September 2021, the Bank for International Settlements (BIS), in collaboration with Thailand, Hong Kong, China, and the UAE, published a report regarding the second phase of the mBridge project, aiming to establish a system involving multiple CBDCs to enable faster, more cost-effective, and efficient methods for conducting cross-border transfers and foreign exchange operations.

The HKMA expressed the intent to collaboratively launch a minimum viable product in 2024, with the effort built on the G20's focus on exploring new technologies to provide more cost-effective and secure real-time cross-border payments and settlements.

In October 2024, BIS was reported to be considering shutting down the pilot mBridge platform, as the 16th BRICS summit had discussed the creation of a "BRICS Bridge," based on the mBridge technology. Such a system would allow BRICS countries to become partly independent of the US-supervised financial system and restrictions to SWIFT, which is subject to US pressure, and thus partly evade the US financial sanctions system. Chinese regulators have since directed banks to use mBridge and it has been used by firms operating in Xinjiang to avoid U.S. sanctions related to the persecution of Uyghurs in China. BIS left the project following the "BRICS Bridge" proposal.

== Related projects ==
Alongside mBridge, there are also other ongoing projects aiming to improve cross-border transactions with CBDC's.

=== Project Aurum ===
A full-stack (front-end and back-end) CBDC system comprising a wholesale interbank system and a retail e-wallet system, bringing to life intermediated CBDC and stablecoins backed by CBDC in the interbank system.

Collaborators: BIS, Hong Kong Monetary Authority, Hong Kong Applied Science and Technology Research Institute

=== Dunbar ===
On 22 March 2022, the BIS Innovation Hub, the Reserve Bank of Australia, Bank Negara Malaysia, the Monetary Authority of Singapore, and the South African Reserve Bank announced the completion of prototypes for a shared Dunbar platform, enabling international settlements using multiple CBDCs.

=== Cedar x Ubin+ ===
The Cedar x Ubin+ project, the flagship venture of the New York Innovation Center in collaboration with the Monetary Authority of Singapore, is a multi-phase technical research initiative that evaluates the potential applications of wholesale CBDCs, built with distributed ledger technology to enhance the efficiency and transparency of cross-border payments.

=== Mariana ===
In October 2023, the Bank for International Settlements, in partnership with the central banks of France, Singapore, and Switzerland, confirmed the successful completion of the Mariana project, which explored cross-border trading and settlement of wholesale CBDCs among financial institutions while integrating decentralized finance technology on a public blockchain.

=== Icebreaker ===
In March 2023, the Bank for International Settlements, in collaboration with the central banks of Israel, Norway, and Sweden, completed the Icebreaker project, which examined the technical feasibility of using retail CBDCs in international payments.

=== Jura ===
In November 2021, the consortium responsible for Jura project, comprising the Bank for International Settlements, Banque de France, Swiss National Bank, and various private firms, explored the direct transfer of Euro and Swiss franc wholesale CBDCs between French and Swiss commercial banks on a single distributed ledger platform. The group officially confirmed the experiment's success in a report released on December 8, 2021.

== See also ==
- BRICS PAY
- History of central bank digital currencies by country
- New Development Bank
