= Indian 200-rupee note =

Denomination of the Indian rupee

Two Hundred rupees
- Country: India
- Value: ₹200 (approximately. $3)
- Width: 146 mm
- Height: 66 mm
- Years of printing: 25 August 2017– present

Obverse
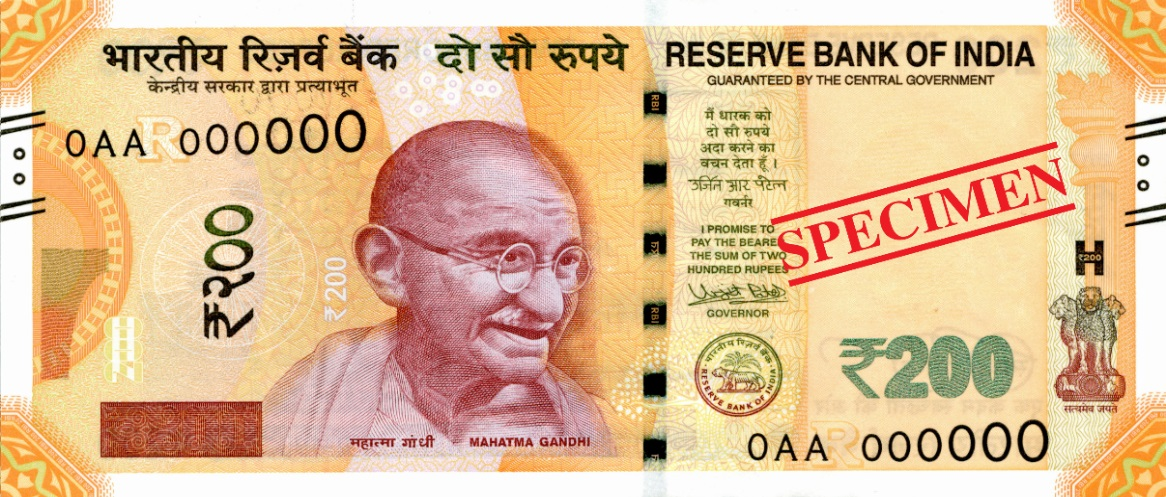
- Design: Mahatma Gandhi New Series
- Design date: 2017

Reverse
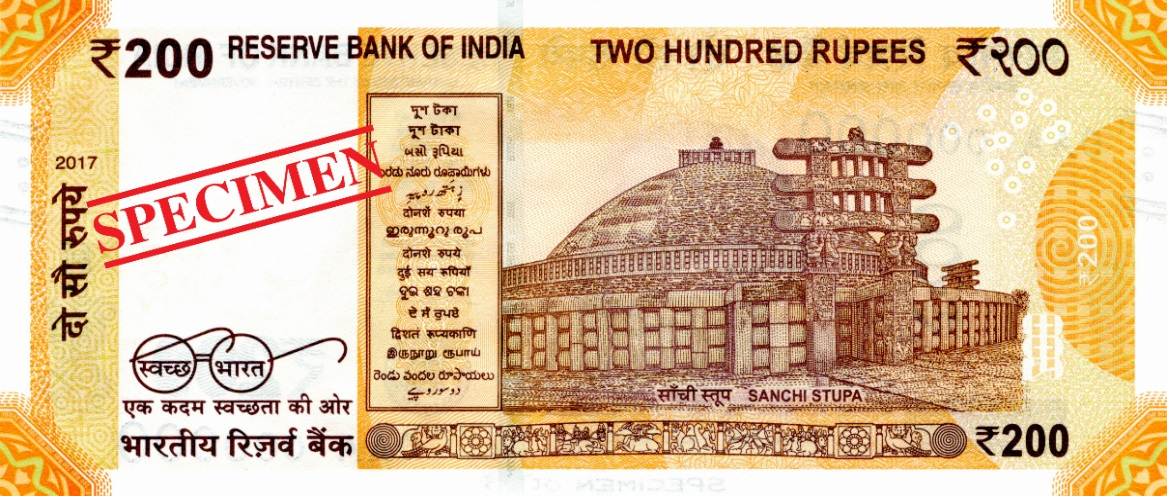
- Design: Sanchi Stupa
- Design date: 2017

The Indian 200-rupee note (₹200) is a denomination of the Indian rupee. After the 2016 Indian banknote demonetisation, the new currency notes were announced by the Reserve Bank of India: ₹2,000, ₹500, ₹200, ₹100, ₹50, ₹20 and ₹10.

In order to determine currency denominations, the Reserve Bank of India follows a variation of the Renard series, called the 1-2-5 series, in which a ‘decade’ or a 1:10 ratio is covered in 3 steps, such as 1, 2, 5, 10, 20, 50, 100, 200, 500, 1,000, etc. The Reserve Bank of India described the 200-rupee notes as the missing link in the Renard series. Besides the Indian Rupee, Euro and British Pound sterlings are two of the most notable currencies that are denominated in the 1-2-5 series. Renard series first proposed by French Army engineer Charles Renard. In March 2017, the decision to introduce ₹200 notes was taken by the Reserve Bank of India with the consultation of the Ministry of Finance. The currency is produced by printing units of the government-run Security Printing and Minting Corporation of India or at printing presses in Mysore and Salboni, managed by the Reserve Bank of India-owned Bharatiya Reserve Bank Note Mudran Private Limited, reportedly by Times of India. The Government of India (GOI) had examined the introduction of the ₹200 notes that would help citizens transact easily. In June 2017, a photograph of a ₹200 banknote went viral on social media platforms like Facebook and WhatsApp. RBI announced the specifications of the new 200-rupee note in the Mahatma Gandhi New Series, bearing the signature of Dr. Urjit R. Patel, Governor of the Reserve Bank of India on 25 August 2017.

== Design ==
On 25 August 2017, the Reserve Bank of India introduced a new ₹200 banknote in the Mahatma Gandhi (New) Series. The new version of the note has a depiction of Sanchi Stupa on the reverse, depicting the country’s cultural heritage. The base colour of the note is Bright Yellow. The dimensions of the banknote are measured at 146 mm x 66 mm.[9] Four angular bleed lines and two circles between angular bleed lines at the right corner H symbol with 200 at right corner above ashoka pillar

== Circulation ==
The Reserve Bank of India announced that new 200-rupee banknotes would be in circulation from 25 August 2017 on the occasion of Ganesh Chaturthi.

== Languages ==
As like the other Indian rupee banknotes, the ₹200 banknote has its amount written in 17 languages. On the obverse, the denomination is written in English and Hindi. On the reverse is a language panel which displays the denomination of the note in 15 of the 22 official languages of India. The languages are displayed in alphabetical order. Languages included on the panel are Assamese, Bengali, Gujarati, Kannada, Kashmiri, Konkani, Malayalam, Marathi, Nepali, Odia, Punjabi, Sanskrit, Tamil, Telugu and Urdu.

Denominations in central level official languages (at below either ends)
Language	₹200
English	Two hundred rupees
Hindi	दो सौ रुपये
Denominations in 15 state level/other official languages (as seen on the language panel)
Assamese	দুশ টকা
Bengali	দুশ টাকা
Gujarati	બસો રૂપિયા
Kannada	ಎರಡು ನೂರು ರೂಪಾಯಿಗಳು
Kashmiri	زٕ ہَتھ رۄپیہِ
Konkani	दोनशें रुपया
Malayalam	ഇരുന്നൂറ് രൂപ
Marathi	दोनशे रुपये
Nepali	दुई सय रुपियाँ
Odia	ଦୁଇ ଶହ ଟଙ୍କା
Punjabi	ਦੋ ਸੌ ਰੁਪਏ
Sanskrit	द्विशतं रूप्यकाणि
Tamil	இருநூறு ரூபாய்
Telugu	రెండు వందల రూపాయలు
Urdu	دو سو روپیے

== See also ==
- Indian 2000-rupee note
- Indian 500-rupee note
- 2016 Indian banknote demonetisation
