= E-Cedi =

Ghana digital currency

The E-Cedi is a proposed central bank digital currency (CBDC) for Ghana. In June 2021, he announced the development of the E-Cedi.

CBDC are currencies that digitize a country's fiat currency. Electronic tokens backed by the Ghana government will replace coin minting or printing paper notes.

== History ==
The E-Cedi is part of a project called the 'Digital Ghana Agenda'. Its goal is the digitization of Ghana's 30 million people, and government services. The E-Cedi is to complement the Ghanaian cedi, and serve as an alternative to physical cash, and the 'Cashlite Agenda'. The three phases for the E-Cedi are design, implementation, and piloting. The E-Cedi will be used on mobile applications and other apps. The Bank of Ghana partnered with Emtech, a fintech startup with its focus on central banks and digital transformation for the banking sector. Emtech is a software that tests solutions including the blockchain.

On August 20, 2021, the President of Ghana Nana Akufo-Addo stated that the E-Cedi introduced by the Bank of Ghana, “will completely transform the architecture of our payment system and deepen financial inclusion, support inclusive and shared growth for our people”.

On August 28, 2021, at the 40th anniversary celebration of Akuapem Rural Bank Limited, at Mamfe Akuapem in the Eastern Region, Dr. Ernest Addison the Governor of the Bank of Ghana (BoG), stated that Ghana is on track to introduce its digital currency, the E-Cedi. The E-Cedi he said will be the first general-purpose Central Bank Digital Currency in Africa.

In September 2021, the BoG went into the pilot stage of the E-Cedi. The E-Cedi will have products and services to bridge the gap between the banked and unbanked.

On September 30, 2021, Ghana announced being in the advanced pre-design stages of a state-backed digital currency, which will make Ghana one of the first African countries to develop a state-backed digital currency.

In October 2021, Kwame Oppong, head of fintech and innovations for the Bank of Ghana, announced at the Ghana Economic Forum that the bank would facilitate offline transactions with E-Cedi.
