= Digital pound =

The Digital pound (also known as digital sterling or britcoin) is a proposed central bank digital currency from the Bank of England. It is intended to supplement, not replace, cash in the United Kingdom. The value of the digital pound would be the same as cash pound sterling so that £10 of digital pounds would have the same value as a banknote of £10.

It would differ from a cryptocurrency or cryptoasset because it would be created and backed by the Bank of England and the Government of the United Kingdom, rather than by a company or anonymous person or group.

A public consultation on the digital pound lasting four months was announced on 6 February 2023. A final decision on the implementation of a digital pound would be expected around 2025, with consumer usage expected in the late 2020s.

In a March 2024 episode of BBC Radio 4's Money Box, Harriett Baldwin, chair of the UK Parliament's Treasury Select Committee, said a digital pound would not be introduced before 2030, and that people’s holdings would probably be limited to £10,000 as a way of avoiding the possibility of worsening any run on a bank; the European Union was considering a limit of 6,000 euros. In reply to a consultation, the government had said it would not seek to control people’s use of a digital currency but did not say it would not look at the data to see how the money was moving around.

In January 2025, the Bank of England announced the creation of the 'Digital Pound Lab,' a technology sandbox designed to facilitate hands-on experimentation for a potential UK central bank digital currency. This initiative aims to test application programming interface functionality, explore innovative use cases, and assess potential business models for payment interface providers and external service interface providers. The Digital Pound Lab is part of the Bank's ongoing 'design phase,' which seeks to establish a clear proposition for a digital pound, subject to parliamentary approval and primary legislation.
