= Indian 500-rupee note =

Highest value banknote of the Indian rupee

Five hundred rupees
- Country: India
- Value: ₹500 (approx. $6.75)
- Width: 150 mm
- Height: 66 mm
- Years of printing: 10 November 2016 – present

Obverse
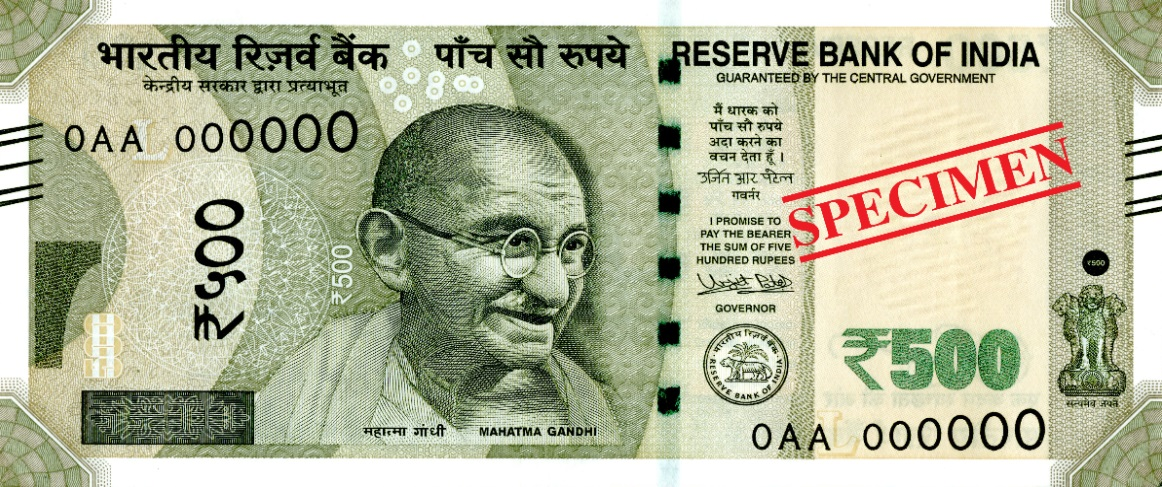
- Design: Mahatma Gandhi
- Designer: Reserve Bank of India
- Design date: 2016; 10 years ago

Reverse
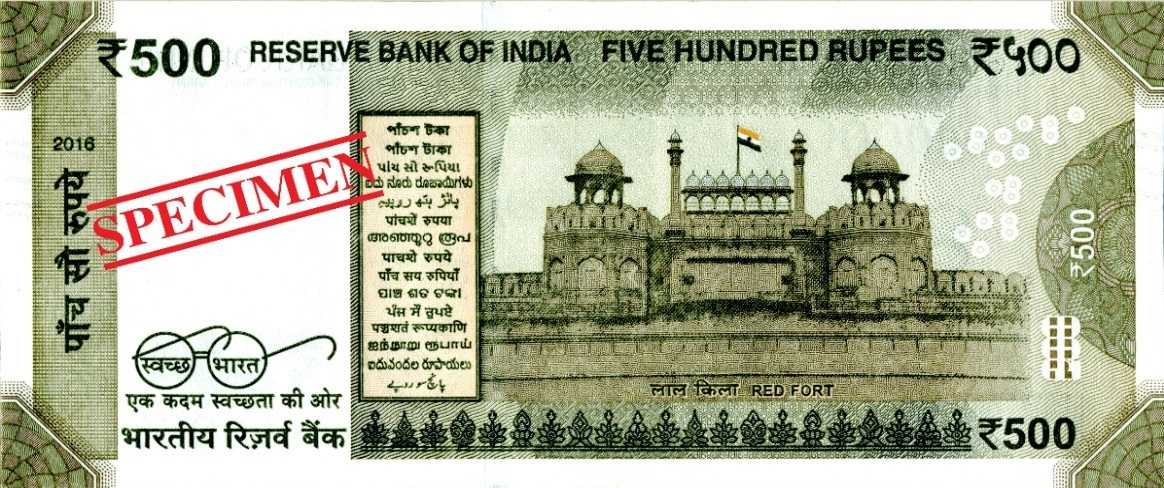
- Design: Red Fort
- Designer: Reserve Bank of India
- Design date: 2016; 10 years ago

The Indian 500-rupee banknote (₹500) is a denomination of the Indian rupee. In 1987, the ₹500 note was introduced, followed by the ₹1,000 note in the year. The current ₹500 banknote, in circulation since 10 November 2016, is a part of the Mahatma Gandhi New Series. The previous banknotes of the Mahatma Gandhi Series, in circulation between October 1997 and November 2016, were demonetised on November 8, 2016.

== History ==
The Indian 500-rupee banknote (₹500) is a denomination of the Indian rupee. In 1987, the ₹500 note was introduced, followed by the ₹1,000 note in 2000 while ₹1 and ₹2 notes were discontinued in 1995. The current ₹500 banknote, in circulation since 10 November 2016, is a part of the Mahatma Gandhi New Series. The previous banknotes of the Mahatma Gandhi Series, in circulation between October 1997 and November 2016, were demonetised on 8 November 2016.

On 8 November 2016, Indian prime minister Narendra Modi announced the demonetization of the ₹500 banknotes of the Mahatma Gandhi Series as a measure to fight corruption in India and address the issue of counterfeit banknotes. On 10 November 2016, the previous banknote was replaced by a new ₹500 banknote of the Mahatma Gandhi New Series of banknotes.

== Mahatma Gandhi Series ==
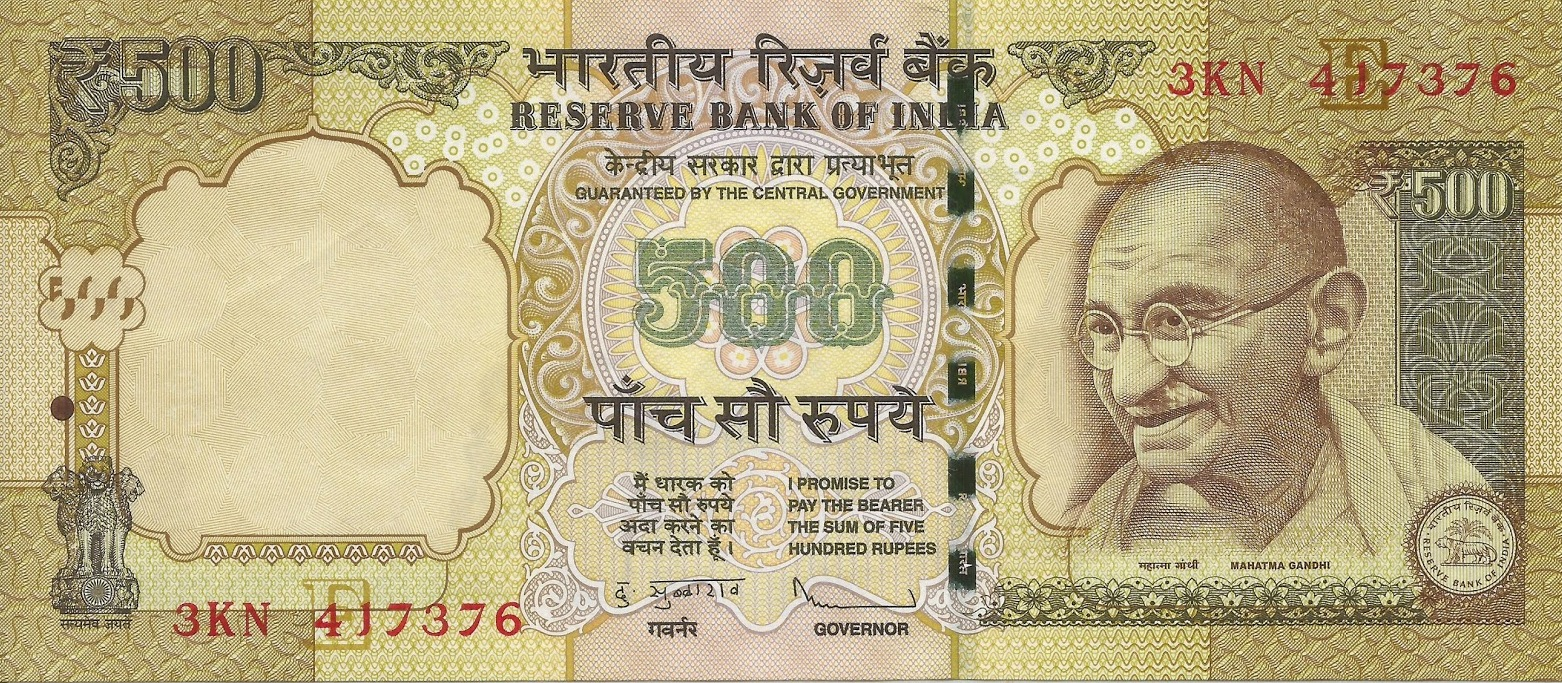
Obverse of the ₹500 banknote between October 1997 – November 2016

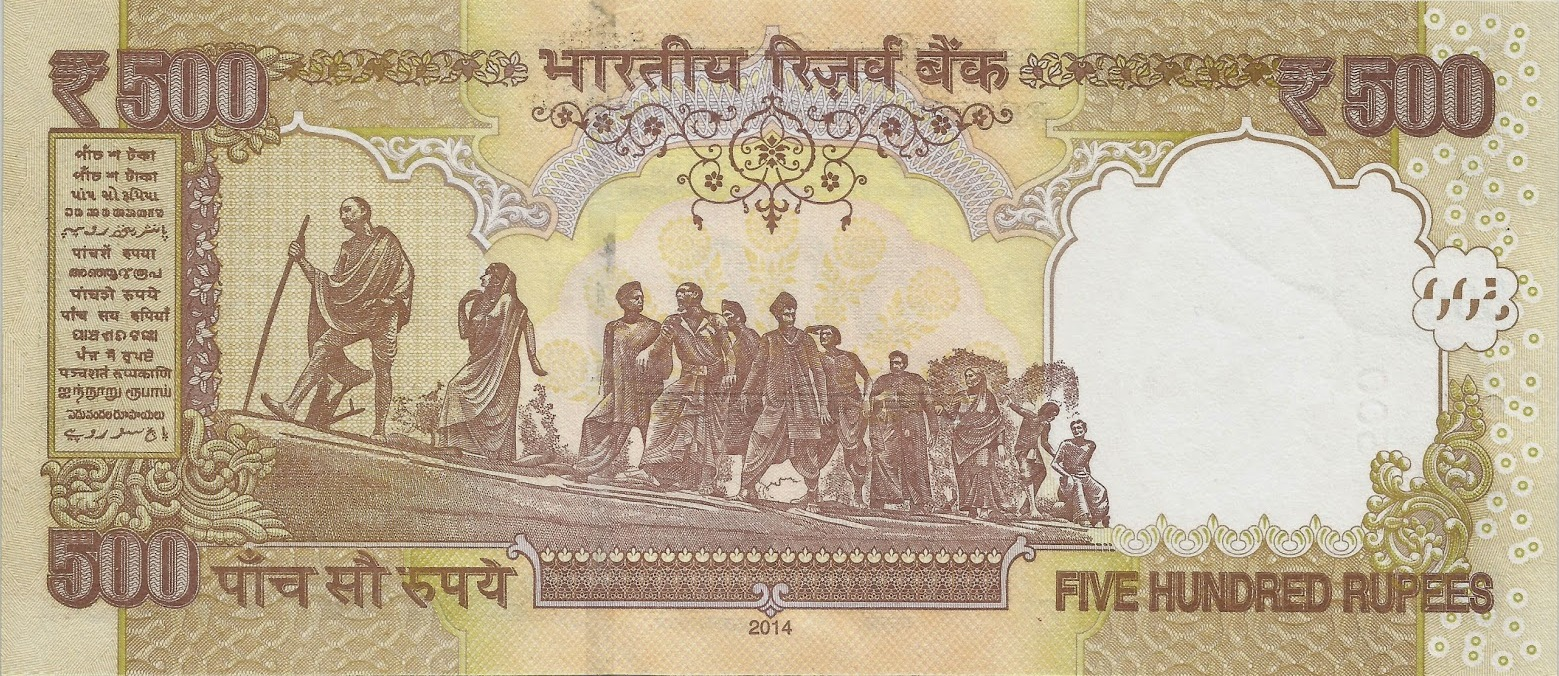
Reverse of the ₹500 banknote between October 1997 – November 2016

=== Design ===
The ₹500 banknote of the Mahatma Gandhi Series is 167 × 73 mm orange-yellow coloured, with the obverse side featuring a portrait of Mahatma Gandhi with a signature of the governor of the Reserve Bank of India. It has the Braille feature to assist the visually challenged in identifying the currency. The reverse side features the Gyarah Murti.

As of 2011, the new ₹ sign has been incorporated into banknote of ₹500. In January 2014 RBI announced that it would be withdrawing from circulation all banknotes printed prior to 2005 by 31 March 2014. The deadline was later extended to 1 January 2015. Further deadline was extended until 30 June 2016.

=== Security features ===
The security features of the ₹500 banknote includes:

- A windowed security thread that reads 'भारत' (Bharat in the Devanagari script) and 'RBI' alternately.
- Latent image of the value of the banknote on the vertical band next to the right hand side of Mahatma Gandhi’s portrait.
- Watermark of Mahatma Gandhi that is a mirror image of the main portrait.
- The number panel of the banknote is printed in embedded fluorescent fibers and optically variable ink.
- Since 2005 additional security features like machine-readable security thread, electrotype watermark, and year of print appears on the bank note.

=== Discontinuation ===
Starting from midnight 8 November 2016 all ₹500 and ₹1000 banknotes of the Mahatma Gandhi Series ceased to be a form of legal tender after a televised address to India by Prime Minister Narendra Modi.

== Mahatma Gandhi New Series ==
=== Design ===
The ₹500 banknote of the Mahatma Gandhi New Series is 66mm x 150mm Stone Grey coloured, with the obverse side featuring a portrait of Mahatma Gandhi as well as the Ashoka Pillar Emblem, with the signature of the governor of Reserve Bank of India. It has the Braille feature to assist the visually challenged in identifying the currency. The reverse side features a motif of the Indian heritage site of Red Fort, and the logo and a tag line of Swachh Bharat Abhiyan.

=== Security features ===
- See through register with denominational numeral 500
- Latent image with denominational numeral 500
- Micro letters ‘RBI’ and ‘500’ on the left side of the banknote
- Windowed security thread with inscriptions ‘भारत’, RBI and 500 on banknotes with colour shift. Colour of the thread changes from green to blue when the note is tilted
- Denominational numeral with Rupee Symbol, ₹500 in colour changing ink (green to blue) on bottom right
- Ashoka Pillar emblem on the right Mahatma Gandhi portrait and electrotype (500) watermarks
- Number panel with numerals growing from small to big on the top left side and bottom right side.
- For visually impaired Intaglio or raised printing of Mahatma Gandhi portrait, Ashoka Pillar emblem, five bleed lines and identity mark
- Circle with ₹500 in raised print on the right

== Languages ==
As like the other Indian rupee banknotes, the ₹500 banknote has its amount written in 17 languages. On the obverse, the denomination is written in English and Hindi. On the reverse is a language panel which displays the denomination of the note in 15 of the 22 official languages of India. The languages are displayed in alphabetical order. Languages included on the panel are Assamese, Bengali, Gujarati, Kannada, Kashmiri, Konkani, Malayalam, Marathi, Nepali, Odia, Punjabi, Sanskrit, Tamil, Telugu and Urdu.

Denominations in central level official languages (At below either ends)
Language	₹500
English	Five hundred rupees
Hindi	पाँच सौ रुपये
Denominations in 15 state level/other official languages (As seen on the language panel)
Assamese	পাঁচশ টকা
Bengali	পাঁচশ টাকা
Gujarati	પાંચ સો રૂપિયા
Kannada	ಐದು ನೂರು ರೂಪಾಯಿಗಳು
Kashmiri	پانٛژھ ہَتھ رۄپیہِ
Konkani	पाचशें रुपया
Malayalam	അഞ്ഞൂറു രൂപ
Marathi	पाचशे रुपये
Nepali	पाँच सय रुपियाँ
Odia	ପାଞ୍ଚ ଶତ ଟଙ୍କା
Punjabi	ਪੰਜ ਸੌ ਰੁਪਏ
Sanskrit	पञ्चशतं रूप्यकाणि
Tamil	ஐந்நூறு ரூபாய்
Telugu	ఐదువందల రూపాయలు
Urdu	پانچ سو روپیے

== See also ==
- Mahatma Gandhi New Series
- Indian 200-rupee note
- Indian 2000-rupee note
