= Indian 2000-rupee note =

Obsolete denomination of Indian currency

Two thousand rupees
- Country: India
- Value: ₹2,000 (approx. $26.99)
- Width: 166 mm
- Height: 66 mm
- Years of printing: 2016–2017

Obverse
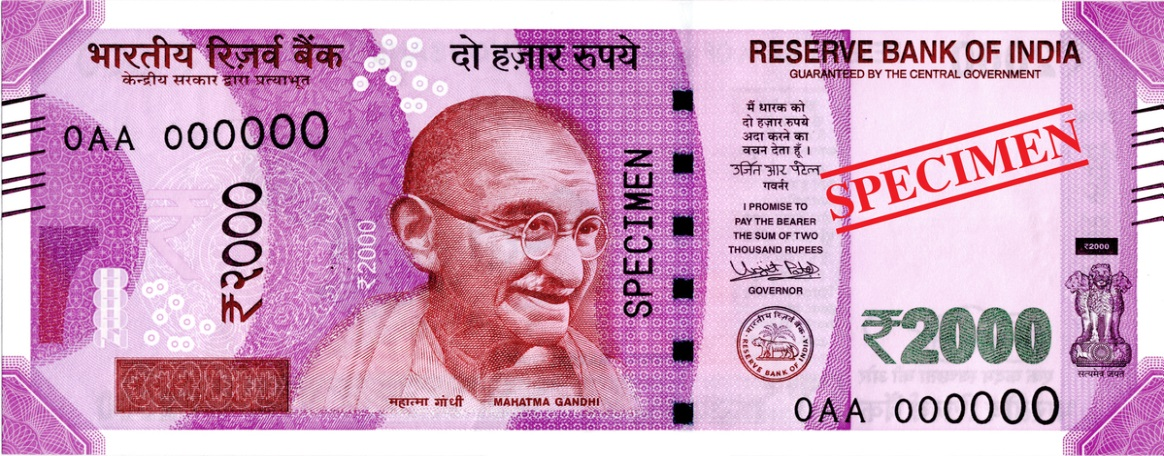
- Design: Mahatma Gandhi
- Designer: Reserve Bank of India
- Design date: 2016

Reverse
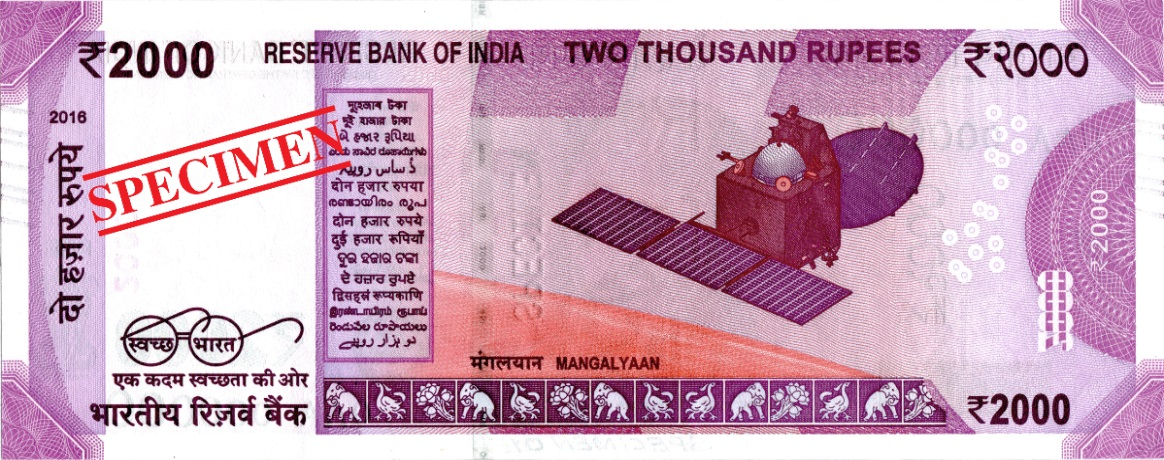
- Design: Mangalyaan
- Designer: Reserve Bank of India
- Design date: 2016

The 2,000 rupee note was introduced by the Reserve Bank of India on 8 November 2016. The introduction of this denomination of the Indian rupee was part of the government's demonetization exercise aimed at curbing corruption, black money and counterfeit currency. On the same day, the Indian government announced the demonetization of the existing 500 rupee and 1000 rupee notes. The intention behind demonetization was to invalidate the old notes to disrupt illegal activities and promote a shift towards digital transactions.

On 19 May 2023, the Reserve Bank of India (RBI) formally announced the withdrawal of the ₹2,000 denomination from active circulation. Although new notes of this denomination are no longer being issued and a large majority of those previously in circulation have since been returned, the ₹2,000 note continues to remain legal tender. The ₹2000 note is still legal tender as of August 2025.

== History ==
It was released by the Reserve Bank of India (RBI) on 8 November 2016 after the demonetisation of ₹500 and ₹1000 banknotes and has been in circulation since 10 November 2016. It is a part of the Mahatma Gandhi New Series of banknotes with a completely new design.

This was the highest currency note printed by RBI that was in active circulation, ever since the 1,000 rupee note was demonetised in November 2016. Before the official announcement by RBI, the media reported that ₹2000 notes had been printed from the currency printing press in Mysuru by the end of October 2016. Post 2016 Indian banknote demonetisation, seven new currency notes have been announced by the Reserve Bank of India-- ₹2,000, ₹500, ₹200, ₹100, ₹50, ₹20, and ₹10.

According to the RBI data, there were 3,285.87 million pieces of ₹2000 notes in circulation at end-March 2017. A year after (on March 31, 2018), there was only a marginal increase in the number at 3,363.28 million pieces. Of the total currency in circulation amounting to ₹18,037 billion at end-March 2018, ₹2000 notes accounted for 37.3 percent, down from 50.2 percent at end-March 2017. The share has come down to 22.6 per cent at end-March 2020.

The ₹2,000 note was created as a quick fix, to have enough circulation of currency. With lower denominations available in circulation, the Indian government and the RBI has rolled back ₹2,000 notes from circulation.

Under the rationale that the ₹2,000 note was being used for hoarding and tax evasion, RBI has stopped the printing of banknotes of ₹2000 denomination and no new notes of this denomination were printed during the 2019-20 financial year.

=== Withdrawal ===
Withdrawal of ₹2000 denomination banknotes – Progression
Date (close of business)	Cumulative % of ₹2000 banknotes returned to banking system	Total value remaining in public circulation (₹ crore)
19 May 2023	-	₹3,56,000
31 August 2023	93%	₹24,000
30 September 2023	96%	₹14,000
31 October 2023	97%	₹10,000
30 November 2023	97.26%	₹9,760
29 December 2023	97.38%	₹9,330
29 February 2024	97.62%	₹8,470
29 March 2024	97.69%	₹8,202
28 June 2024	97.87%	₹7,581
31 July 2024	97.92%	₹7,409
30 August 2024	97.96%	₹7,261
30 September 2024	98%	₹7,117
31 October 2024	98.04%	₹6,970
31 December 2024	98.12%	₹6,691
4 February 2025	98.15%	₹6,577
28 February 2025	98.18%	₹ 6,471
1 April 2025	98.21%	₹6,366
30 April 2025	98.24%	₹6,266
31 August 2025	98.33%	₹5,956
30 September 2025	98.35%	₹5,884

On 20 May 2023, the Reserve Bank of India announced its decision to withdraw the ₹2,000 notes from circulation. Despite this, the notes would temporarily remain legal tender and could be exchanged or deposited in bank accounts until 30 September 2023.

In addition, banks were instructed not to issue 2,000-rupee notes and to increase their staff and counters to handle the expected surge in transactions. The government clarified that this measure is not a "demonetisation" effort. However, the announcement caused some concern among the public, with comparisons being made to the previous demonetisation initiative. While certain BJP lawmakers praised the move as a "second surgical strike on black money," opposition leaders argue that the decision to withdraw notes in 2016 was flawed and that this recent action is an acknowledgment of that mistake. Following the government's announcement, there were reports of individuals using 2,000-rupee notes to make payments at petrol stations and shops in an attempt to dispose of them.

On 1 September 2023, Reserve Bank of India informed that 93% of ₹2,000 notes, worth ₹3.32 lakh crore have been returned to the banking system, and therefore ₹2,000 notes in circulation stood at ₹0.24 lakh crore, at the close of business on 31 August 2023.

On 30 September 2023, Reserve Bank of India informed that 96% of ₹2,000 notes, worth ₹3.42 lakh crore have been returned to the banking system, and therefore ₹2,000 notes in circulation stood at ₹0.14 lakh crore. Reserve Bank of India extended the deposit/exchange deadline to 7 October 2023, and thereafter can be exchanged by individuals at the 19 RBI Issue Offices only.

On 1 November 2023, Reserve Bank of India informed that 97% of ₹2,000 notes have been returned to the banking system, however ₹2,000 notes worth ₹10,000 crore are still in circulation with public, at the close of business on 31 October 2023.

On 1 December 2023, Reserve Bank of India informed that 97.26% of ₹2,000 notes have been returned to the banking system, however ₹2,000 notes worth ₹9,760 crore are still in circulation with public, at the close of business on 30 November 2023. RBI said that 2,000 bank notes continue to be legal tender.

On 1 March 2024, Reserve Bank of India informed that 97.62% of ₹2,000 notes have been returned to the banking system, however ₹2,000 notes worth ₹8,470 crore are still in circulation with public, at the close of business on 29 February 2024. RBI said that 2,000 bank notes continue to be legal tender.

On 1 April 2024, Reserve Bank of India informed that 97.69% of ₹2,000 notes have been returned to the banking system, however ₹2,000 notes worth ₹8,202 crore are still in circulation with public, at the close of business on 29 March 2024.

As of April 30 2025, the figure has dropped to rupees ₹6,266 crore, indicating that 98.24% of the 2000 rupees notes in circulation at the time of the announcement have been returned.

On 1 September 2025, Reserve Bank of India informed that 98.33% of ₹2,000 notes have been returned to the banking system, however ₹2,000 notes worth ₹5,956 crore are still in circulation with public, at the close of business on 31 August 2025.

== Design ==
The ₹2000 banknote was a 66 mm × 166 mm Magenta coloured note, with the obverse side featuring a portrait of Mahatma Gandhi, the Ashoka Pillar Emblem, and the signature of Reserve Bank of India Governor. It has Braille print on it, to assist the visually challenged in identifying the currency. The reverse side features a motif of the Mangalyaan, representing India's first interplanetary space mission, and the logo and tag line for Swachh Bharat Abhiyan.

=== Security features ===
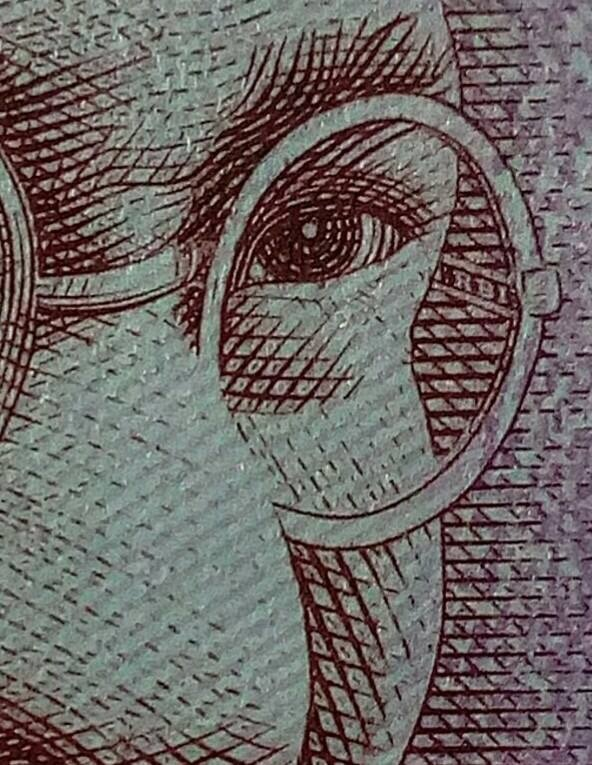
Microscopic view of the ₹2000 Indian currency note showing micro printing of letters 'RBI'

The ₹2000 banknotes has multiple security features, listed below:

- See-through registration device with denominational numeral ₹2000
- Latent image with denominational numeral ₹2000
- Denominational numeral २००० rendered in Devnagari script
- Micro letters 'RBI' and '2000' on the left side of the banknote
- Windowed security thread with inscriptions 'भारत', RBI, and ₹2000 on banknotes, with a colour shift. The thread colour changes from green to blue when the note is tilted
- Guarantee Clause, the Governor’s signature with the Promise Clause, and the RBI's emblem on the right side
- Denominational numeral with Rupee Symbol, ₹2000 in colour changing ink (green to blue) on bottom right
- Ashoka Pillar emblem on the right Mahatma Gandhi portrait and electrotype (2000) watermarks
- Number panel with numerals growing from small to big on the top left side and bottom right side.
- For the visually impaired Intaglio (raised printing) of Mahatma Gandhi portrait, Ashoka Pillar emblem, bleed lines and identity mark
- Horizontal rectangle with ₹2000 in raised print on the right
- Seven angular bleed lines on left and right side in raised print (obverse)
- Year of printing of the note on the left (reverse)

=== Languages ===
Like other Indian rupee banknotes, the ₹2000 banknote has its amount written in 17+1 languages (Braille language added on new currency notes for visually impaired). On the obverse, the denomination is written in English and Hindi. On the reverse is a language panel which displays the denomination of the note in 15 of the 22 official languages of India. The languages are displayed in alphabetical order. Languages included on the panel are Assamese, Bengali, Gujarati, Kannada, Kashmiri, Konkani, Malayalam, Marathi, Nepali, Odia, Punjabi, Sanskrit, Tamil, Telugu, Urdu, and Braille.

Denominations in central level official languages (At below either ends)
Language	₹2000
English	Two Thousand Rupees
Hindi	दो हज़ार रुपये
Denominations in 15 state level/other official languages (As seen on the language panel)
Assamese	দুহেজাৰ টকা
Bengali	দুই হাজার টাকা
Gujarati	બે હજાર રૂપિયા
Kannada	ಎರಡು ಸಾವಿರ ರೂಪಾಯಿಗಳು
Kashmiri	زٕ ساس رۄپیہِ
Konkani	दोन हजार रुपया
Malayalam	രണ്ടായിരം രൂപ
Marathi	दोन हजार रुपये
Nepali	दुई हजार रुपियाँ
Odia	ଦୁଇ ହଜାର ଟଙ୍କା
Punjabi	ਦੋ ਹਜ਼ਾਰ ਰੁਪਏ
Sanskrit	द्विसहस्रं रूप्यकाणि
Tamil	இரண்டாயிரம் ரூபாய்
Telugu	రెండు వేల రూపాయలు
Urdu	دو ہزار روپیے

== See also ==
- Mahatma Gandhi New Series
- Indian 500 and 1000 rupee note demonetisation
- Indian 500-rupee note
- Indian 200-rupee note
- Indian 100-rupee note
- Indian rupee
