= Dipak Dasgupta =

Dipak Dasgupta is an Indian economist. He is a Distinguished Fellow at The Energy and Resources Institute in New Delhi. Dasgupta was the former Principal Economic Advisor at the Ministry of Finance (India). He was also India's founding Board Member of the Green Climate Fund and served until recently. Before, Dasgupta was the Lead Economist for India and South Asia at the World Bank.

Published works include China Engaged: Integration with the Global Economy; Trade, Investment, and Development in the Middle East and North Africa: Engaging with the World; and Moving Up, Looking East.
