= Coins of the Indian rupee =

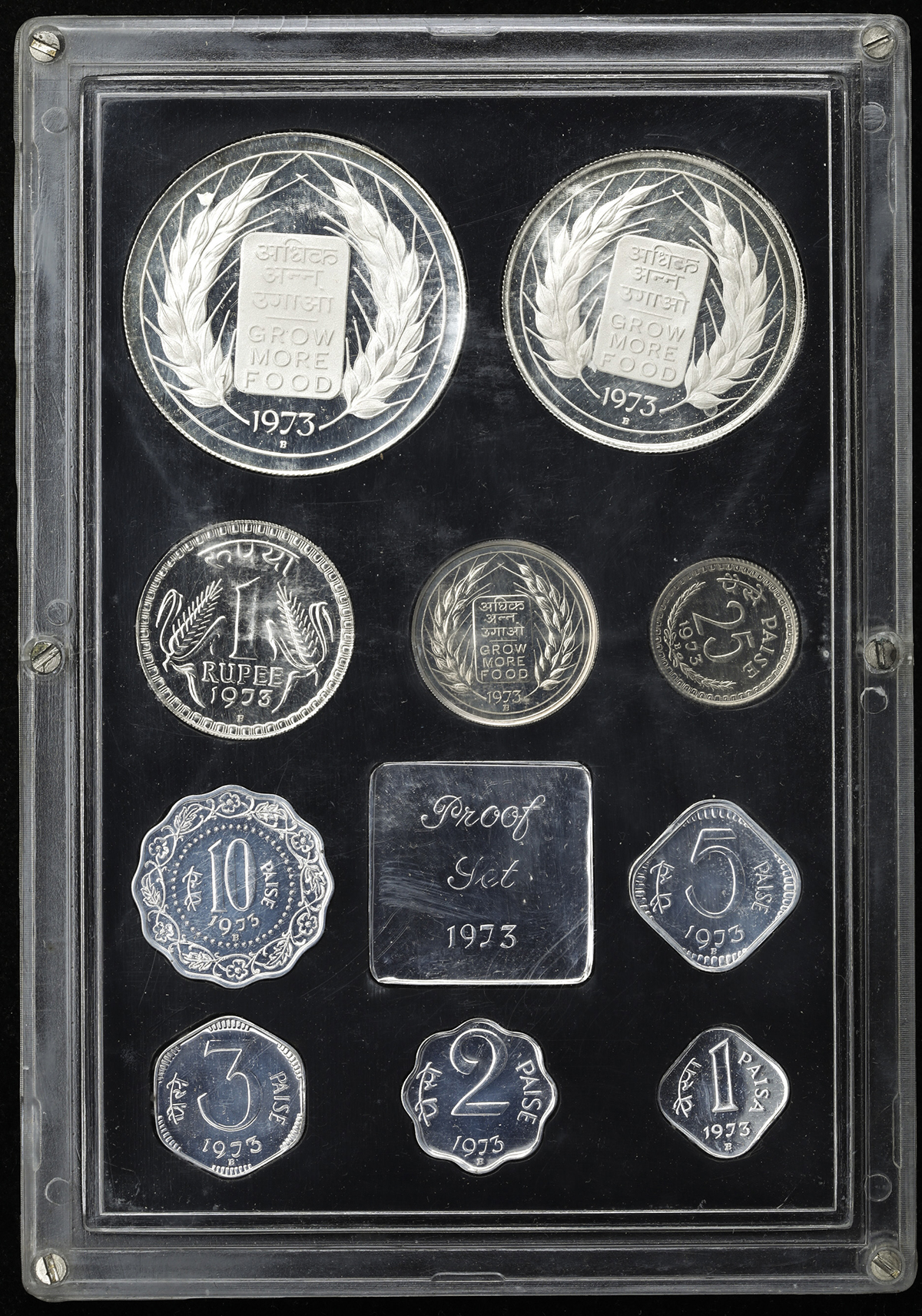
1973 Indian proof set of coins

Coins of the Indian rupee (₹) were first minted in 1950. New coins have been produced annually since then and they make up a valuable aspect of the Indian currency system. Today, circulating coins exist in denominations of 1, 2, 5, 10, and 20 Indian rupees. All of these are produced by four mints located across India, in Kolkata, Mumbai, Hyderabad, and Noida.

== History ==
After Indian independence in 1947, British Indian coins were in use as a frozen currency until the dominion of India became a republic in 1950. The first rupee coins of the Republic of India were minted in 1950. These included ₹1/2, ₹1/4, 2 anna, 1 anna, 1/2 anna & 1 pice coins, and are referred to as the anna series or pre-decimal coinage. Under the anna series, one rupee was divided into 16 annas or 64 pice, with each anna equal to 4 pice. In 1957, India shifted to the decimal system, though both decimal and non-decimal coins were in circulation for several years afterwards. All old pice and anna coins were demonetised from 1 January 1964.

To distinguish between the two versions of pice coins in circulation (pre-decimal and decimal), the coins minted between 1957 and 1964 were printed with the legend “Naya Paisa” (“New Paisa”). The denominations in circulation were 1, 2, 3, 5, 10, 20, 25, 50 (naya) paisa and one rupee. Since rupees retained their pre-decimal value, pre-decimal coins of one, half and quarter rupees remained in circulation after decimalisation. With effect from 30 September 1968, all British Indian (pre-decimalisation) rupee coins minted in quaternary alloy (1/2 silver composition) were officially demonetised, though pre-decimalisation rupee coins minted in pure nickel, including British Indian issues from June 1946 onwards, continued to be legal tender. The final British Indian-period rupee coin series was demonetised on 31 December 1984.

The word "naya" was dropped in 1964 and a new denomination, the 3 paisa, was introduced into circulation. A 20 paisa coin was minted in 1968. Neither of these coins gained much popularity. The 1, 2 and 3 paisa coins were phased out gradually in the 1970s. In 1982, a new 2 rupee coin was introduced experimentally to replace 2 rupee notes. The 2 rupee coin was not minted again till 1990, after which it was minted every following year.

Stainless steel coinage of 10, 25 and 50 paisa was introduced in 1988. In 1992, a new stainless steel rupee coin, smaller and lighter than the older rupee, was minted, alongside a 5 rupee Cupronickel coin.

In 2005, the 10 rupee coin was minted for the first time. Higher denomination coins were introduced due to an increasing demand for change and the increasing cost of printing ₹2, ₹5 and ₹10 banknotes.

On 30 June 2011, all coins in denominations of 25 paisa and below were officially demonetised.

Commemorative coins in circulation can be found in various denominations. They depict various special events or people, including Mahatma Gandhi, Jawaharlal Nehru, Indira Gandhi, B. R. Ambedkar, Rajiv Gandhi, Dnyaneshwar, the 1982 Asian Games, Vallabhbhai Patel, Subhas Chandra Bose, Sri Aurobindo, Chittaranjan Das, the 2010 Commonwealth Games, Shivaji, Bhagat Singh, Rabindranath Tagore, Atal Bihari Vajpayee, Jallianwala Bagh massacre, Bal Gangadhar Tilak etc.

== Coin series: 1947–1957 (pre-decimalisation) ==
At Independence on 15 August 1947, India was partitioned into the new Dominion of India and Dominion of Pakistan. The lowest-denomination Indian coins, the half-pice (128 to a rupee) and the pie (192 to a rupee) were officially withdrawn from circulation in 1947, new examples were not minted after 1942 due to their very low value (India remained a member of the sterling area after independence and the rupee remained pegged to the pound sterling. Until 1966, the rupee was worth 1s.6d, or 18 old British pence; a half-pice was therefore worth 0.141 old pence and a pie 0.09 old pence.) All half-pice and pie coins were demonetised from 1 January 1959.

The remaining British India-period and early Republic of India coins mostly continued to circulate until decimalisation in 1957, after which they were progressively demonetised through 1968, excepting the nickel rupee, half-rupee and quarter-rupee issues, including the pre-Independence George VI issues. Nickel-brass anna and half-annas were demonetised from 1 January 1960, followed by cupro-nickel half-anna and two-anna coins from 1 October 1960. 1-pice and British Indian 2-pice coins were demonetised from 1 January 1964, along with cupro-nickel 1-anna coins. All George VI rupee denominations were demonetised from 31 December 1984.

=== Union of India 1947–1950 ===
The new Dominion (or Union) of India retained the previous imperial currency with the portrait of King George VI. The basic unit of currency was the Indian rupee, which was itself divided into annas (16 annas to a rupee) and pice (the old spelling of paisa – 64 pice to a rupee). At Independence on 15 August 1947, the Indian coinage structure was as follows:

₹ and its fractions	Annas	Pice	Pies
₹	16 annas	64 pice	192 pies
**Half ₹**	8 annas	32 pice	96 pies
**Quarter ₹**	4 annas	16 pice	48 pies
1/8 ₹	**2 annas**	8 pice	24 pies
1/16 ₹	**1 anna**	4 pice	12 pies
1/32 ₹	**Half anna**	2 pice	6 pies
1/64 ₹	1/4 anna	**1 pice**	3 pies
1/128 ₹	1/8 anna	1/2 pice	1 1/2 pies
1/192 ₹	1/16 anna	1/4 pice	Pie

(bold - denominations minted by the Government of India)

This represented the currency arrangements during the transition period up to the establishment of the Republic of India, as follows:

George VI series
Denomination	Image		Single/ Bi-metallic	Metal	Shape	Diameter	Minted in Years	Demonetised
Denomination	Obverse	Reverse	Single/ Bi-metallic	Metal	Shape	Diameter	Minted in Years	Demonetised
One Rupee	One rupee coin (George VI series) 1957, observe	One rupee coin (George VI series) 1957, reverse	Singlemetallic	Nickel	Circular	28 mm	1947	31 December 1984
Half Rupee			Singlemetallic	Nickel	Circular	24 mm	1946 - 1947	31 December 1984
Quarter Rupee			Singlemetallic	Nickel	Circular	19 mm	1946 - 1947	31 December 1984
2 Annas			Singlemetallic	Copper - Nickel	Square	25 mm	1946 - 1947	1 October 1960
1 Anna			Singlemetallic	Nickel - Brass	12 Scalloped	21 mm	1945	1 January 1960
1 Anna			Singlemetallic	Copper - Nickel	12 Scalloped	21.1 mm	1946 - 1947	1 January 1964
1/2 Anna			Singlemetallic	Nickel - Brass	Square	19.8 mm	1942 - 1945	1 January 1960
1/2 Anna			Singlemetallic	Copper - Nickel	Square	19.7 mm	1946 - 1947	1 October 1960
1 Pice			Singlemetallic	Bronze	Circular with a hole	21.32 mm	1943 - 1947	1 January 1964

=== Republic of India 1950-1957 ===
On 26 January 1950, India became an independent republic in the Commonwealth of Nations. This series was introduced on 15 August 1950 and represented the first coinage of Republic of India. The British King's portrait was replaced by the Lion Capital of the Ashoka Pillar. A corn sheaf replaced the Tiger on the one rupee coin. In some ways this symbolised a shift in focus to progress and prosperity. Indian motifs were incorporated on other coins. The previous monetary system and the old units of currency were retained unchanged.

Republic of India Pre-decimalization series (1950 - 1957)
Denomination	Image		Single/ Bi-metallic	Metal	Shape	Diameter	Minted in Years	Demonetised
Denomination	Obverse	Reverse	Single/ Bi-metallic	Metal	Shape	Diameter	Minted in Years	Demonetised
One Rupee			Singlemetallic	Nickel	Circular	27.9 mm	1950 - 1954	
Half Rupee			Singlemetallic	Nickel	Circular	24 mm	1950 - 1956	
Quarter Rupee			Singlemetallic	Nickel	Circular	19 mm	1950 - 1956	30 June 2011
Two Annas			Singlemetallic	Cupro-Nickel	Square	25.4 mm	1950 - 1955	1 October 1960
One Anna			Singlemetallic	Cupro-Nickel	12 Scalloped	21 mm	1950 - 1954	1 January 1964
Half Anna			Singlemetallic	Cupro-Nickel	Square	19.5 mm	1950 - 1955	1 October 1960
One Pice			Singlemetallic	Bronze	Circular	21 mm	1950 - 1955	1 January 1964

== Decimalization ==
The move towards decimalization was afoot for over a century. However, it was in September, 1955 that the Indian Coinage Act was amended for the country to adopt a metric system for coinage. The Act came into force with effect from 1 April 1957, after which anna and pice denominations were progressively demonetised.

The rupee remained unchanged in value and nomenclature. It, however, was now divided into 100 'paisa' instead of 16 annas or 64 pice. Effective from 30 June 2011, all coins in denominations of 25 paisa and below were officially demonetized.

Pre-decimal currency (1950-1957; minting ceased in 1955)	Decimal currency replacement (1957–present)	Decimal currency (dates minted)
N/A	20 rupees	2019–present
N/A	10 rupees	2005–present
N/A	5 rupees	1992–present
N/A	2 rupees	1982–present
Rupee	1 rupee (divided into 100 new paise 1957–1964; divided into 100 paisa 1964–present).	1962–present
Half rupee	50 paise	1957–2016
Quarter rupee	25 paise	1957-2002. Demonetised from 2011.
N/A	20 paise	1968-1994. Demonetised from 2011.
2 annas	10 paise	1957-1998. Demonetised from 2011.
Anna	5 paise	1957-1994. Demonetized from 2011.
N/A	3 paise	1964-1972; proofs minted until 1981. Demonetized from 2011.
Half anna	2 paise	1957-1979; proofs minted until 1981. Demonetized from 2011.
Pice	1 paisa	1957-1972; proofs minted until 1981. Demonetized from 2011, but retained as a unit of currency.

== Coin series 1957–present (decimal) ==
=== Naya Paisa series 1957–1963 ===
The antiquated spelling of "pice" was modified to "paisa" in the singular and "paise" in the plural. For public recognition, the new decimal paisa was termed 'Naya Paisa' (New Paisa) till 1 June 1964 when the term 'Naya' was dropped. The coins of 1p, 2p, 5p, 10p, 25p, and 50p had a legend in Devanagari script explaining the value of coin in terms of fraction of a rupee.

Naya Paisa Series (1957–1963)
Denomination	Image		Single/ Bi-metallic	Metal	Shape	Diameter	Minted in Year
Denomination	Obverse	Reverse	Single/ Bi-metallic	Metal	Shape	Diameter	Minted in Year
One rupee			Singlemetallic	Nickel	Circular	28 mm	1962 - 1974
50 naye paise			Singlemetallic	Nickel	Circular	24 mm	1957 - 1963
25 naye paise			Singlemetallic	Nickel	Circular	18.7 mm	1957 - 1963
10 naye paise	Ten paise coin, 1957, observe	Ten paise coin, 1957, reverse	Singlemetallic	Cupro-Nickel	Eight Scalloped	23 mm (across scallops)	1957 - 1963
5 naye paise			Singlemetallic	Cupro-Nickel	Square	22 mm (across corners)	1957 - 1963
2 naye paise	Two paise coin, 1958, observe	Two paise coin, 1958, reverse	Singlemetallic	Cupro-Nickel	Eight Scalloped	18 mm (across scallops)	1957 - 1963
1 naya paisa			Singlemetallic	Bronze	Circular	16 mm	1957 - 1962
1 naya paisa			Singlemetallic	Nickel Brass	Circular	16 mm	1962 - 1963

=== Paisa Series I with Devanagari Legend 1964 onwards ===
In June 1964, the term 'Naya' was dropped and the coins were as follows reminted. The legend in Devanagari script explaining the value of coin in terms of fraction of a rupee continued till it was finally dropped from the new design minted 1964 onwards.

Paisa Series I with Devanagari Legend (1964–1980s)
Denomination	Image		Single/ Bi-metallic	Metal	Shape	Diameter	Minted in Year
Denomination	Obverse	Reverse	Single/ Bi-metallic	Metal	Shape	Diameter	Minted in Year
50p			Singlemetallic	Nickel	Circular	24 mm	1964 - 1971
25p			Singlemetallic	Nickel	Circular	19 mm	1964 - 1972
10p	Ten paise coin, 1965, observe	Ten paise coin, 1965, reverse	Singlemetallic	Copper Nickel	8 Scalloped	23 mm	1964 - 1967
10p	Ten paise coin, 1968, observe	Ten paise coin, 1968, reverse	Singlemetallic	Nickel Brass	8 Scalloped	23 mm	1968 - 1971
5p	Five paise coin, 1965, observe	Five paise coin, 1965, reverse	Singlemetallic	Copper Nickel	Square	22 mm	1964 - 1966
5p			Singlemetallic	Aluminium	Square	22 mm	1967 - 1971
2p	Two paise coin, 1964, observe	Two paise coin, 1964, reverse	Singlemetallic	Copper Nickel	8 Scalloped	18 mm	1964
1p			Singlemetallic	Aluminium	Square	16 mm	1964

=== Series II without the Devanagari Legend (1965–1983) ===
The coin minted from 1965 did not have the legend in Devanagari, explaining the value of the coin as a fraction of the rupee. Small-denomination coins which were formerly made of bronze, nickel-brass, cupro-nickel and aluminium-bronze were gradually minted in aluminium. The first coin minted in such type was the 3 paisa coin in 1964, which was a new denomination, and continued to be minted till 1971. One and Two paisa coins were changed to aluminium and were minted without the Devanagari legend from 1965. 20 paisa coin was introduced in 1968, which continued to be minted till 1971.

Denomination	Image		Single/ Bi-metallic	Metal	Shape	Diameter	Minted in Year
Denomination	Obverse	Reverse	Single/ Bi-metallic	Metal	Shape	Diameter	Minted in Year
50p			Singlemetallic	Aluminium			
25p			Singlemetallic	Aluminium			
20p			Singlemetallic	Aluminium			
10p			Singlemetallic	Aluminium			
5p			Singlemetallic	Aluminium			
3p			Singlemetallic	Aluminium	Hexagonal	21 mm	1964 - 1971
2p			Singlemetallic	Aluminium			
1p			Singlemetallic	Aluminium			

=== Series III 1982 Onwards ===
From 1982, New series was launched. the 20 paisa coin which was last minted in 1971, was reintroduced again, but in Aluminium. The size and the design of 10 paisa, 50 paisa and 1 rupee was changed, though they continued to be minted in the same metal. Coins of 3p, 2p and 1p were discontinued but continued to be the legal tender.

Denomination	Image		Single/ Bi-metallic	Metal	Shape	Diameter	Minted in Year
Denomination	Obverse	Reverse	Single/ Bi-metallic	Metal	Shape	Diameter	Minted in Year
₹1			Singlemetallic	Copper-Nickel	Circular	26 mm	1983 - 1991
50p			Singlemetallic	Copper-Nickel	Circular	24 mm	1984 - 1990
20p			Singlemetallic	Aluminium	Hexagonal	26 mm	1982 - 1997
10p			Singlemetallic	Aluminium	8 Scalloped	23 mm	1983 - 1993
5p			Singlemetallic	Aluminium	Square	22 mm	1984 - 1994

=== Series IV 1988 Onwards ===
In Series IV, 5 paisa and 20 paisa coins were discontinued though they continued to be minted in Series III till 1994 and 1997 respectively. 10 paisa, 25 paisa and 50 paisa coins were minted in Stainless Steel. 1992 onwards, ₹1 coin was also minted in Steel and ₹2 and ₹5 coins in Copper Nickel were introduced. The very considerable costs of managing note issues of ₹1, ₹2, and ₹5 led to the gradual coinage of these denominations. These coins continued to be minted till 2004, when the Unity in diversity series was launched.

Cupro-Nickel coins are not minted anymore. Ferritic Stainless Steel coins of two and five rupee denominations are currently in production.

1988 Stainless steel series
Denomination	Image		Single/ Bi-metallic	Metal	Shape	Diameter	Minted in Year
Denomination	Obverse	Reverse	Single/ Bi-metallic	Metal	Shape	Diameter	Minted in Year
₹5 Five Rupees			Singlemetallic	Copper-Nickel	Circular	23 mm	1992-2004
₹2 Two Rupees			Singlemetallic	Copper-Nickel	Hendecagonal	26 mm	1992-2004
₹1 One Rupee			Singlemetallic	Stainless steel	Circular	25 mm	1992-2004
50p Fifty paise			Singlemetallic	Stainless steel	Circular	22 mm	1988-2007
25p Twenty-five paise			Singlemetallic	Stainless steel	Circular	19 mm	1988-2002
10p Ten paise			Singlemetallic	Stainless steel	Circular	16 mm	1988-1998

=== 2004 Unity in Diversity Series ===
In 2004, RBI issued a series in denominations of 1 rupee, followed by 2 rupee and 10 rupee in 2005. These issues however came into circulation in 2006, and created a controversy over their design. 10 rupee coins were the first bimetallic coins issued in India, and because of the controversy (see below) and being minted in only one mint, most of the coinage never found its way into circulation. The ones which did were hoarded by Coin collectors and Coin hoarders.

2004 Unity in diversity Series
Denomination	Image		Single/ Bi-metallic	Metal	Shape	Diameter	Minted in Year
Denomination	Obverse	Reverse	Single/ Bi-metallic	Metal	Shape	Diameter	Minted in Year
₹10 Ten rupees	Indian_Rs10_coin_2005version_obverse	Indian_Rs10_coin_2005version_reverse	Bimetallic	Center: Copper-Nickel Ring: Aluminium-Bronze	Circular	27 mm	2005-2007
₹5 Five Rupees			Singlemetallic	Stainless steel	Circular	23 mm	2007
₹2 Two Rupees			Singlemetallic	Stainless steel	Circular	26.75 mm	2005-2007
₹1 One Rupee			Singlemetallic	Stainless steel	Circular	25 mm	2004 - 2006

=== 2007 Hasta Mudra Series ===
In 2007, the RBI issued a new series of coins known as the Hasta Mudra Series in the 50 paise, 1 rupee, and 2 rupee denominations. These stainless steel coins featured various Hasta Mudras (hand gestures used in Indian classical dance). The 5 rupee coin with a wave motif was also introduced in 2007, along with a new 10 rupee coin. However, the design of the 10 rupee coin was changed in 2008. The design of the 5 rupee coin was subsequently reverted to the previous type, although it was struck in nickel-brass instead of copper-nickel. However, these 5 rupee and 10 rupee coins were not part of the Hasta Mudra Series.

The Hasta Mudra Series continued to be minted until December 2010 for the 50 paise coin, following the announcement of the upcoming demonetization of paisa currency, which took effect on 30 June 2011. The 1 rupee and 2 rupee coins continued to be minted until February 2011, when Finance Minister Pranab Mukherjee announced in his Budget speech that the rupee symbol would be incorporated into future coin issues. These designs remained the primary types for the 1 rupee and 2 rupee coins until the introduction of the Rupee Symbol Series in July 2011.

2007 Hasta Mudra Series
Denomination	Image		Single/ Bi-metallic	Metal	Shape	Diameter	Minted in Year
Denomination	Obverse	Reverse	Single/ Bi-metallic	Metal	Shape	Diameter	Minted in Year
₹2 Two Rupees			Singlemetallic	Stainless steel	Circular	27 mm	2007-2011
₹1 One Rupee	Indian_Rs_1_coin_hasta_mudra_series_obverse	Indian_Rs_1_coin_hasta_mudra_series_reverse	Singlemetallic	Stainless steel	Circular	25 mm	2007-2011
50p Fifty paise			Singlemetallic	Stainless steel	Circular	22 mm	2008-2010

=== 2007 Common Circulation Series ===
The 5 rupee and 10 rupee coins with revised designs were issued for general circulation in 2007, 2008, 2009 and 2010, and continued to be minted until December 2010. These designs remained the primary types for the 5 rupee and 10 rupee coins until the introduction of the Rupee Symbol series in July 2011.

2007 Common Circulation Series
Denomination	Image		Single/ Bi-metallic	Metal	Shape	Diameter	Minted in Year
Denomination	Obverse	Reverse	Single/ Bi-metallic	Metal	Shape	Diameter	Minted in Year
₹10 Ten rupees			Bimetallic	Center: Copper-Nickel Ring: Aluminium-Bronze	Circular	27 mm	2008 - 2010
₹5 Five Rupees			Singlemetallic	Stainless steel	Circular	23 mm	2007 - 2008
₹5 Five Rupees			Singlemetallic	Nickel-brass	Circular	23 mm	2009 - 2010

=== 2011 Series with the Rupee Symbol (₹) ===
On 8 July 2011, RBI issued a series in denominations of 50 paise, ₹1, ₹2, ₹5, and ₹10. The 50p, ₹1, ₹2, and ₹5 designs are identical except the absence of the rupee symbol in 50p coin. The ₹10 coin continued to be issued in bimetallic issues as previously.

2011 Rupee Symbol Series
Denomination	Image		Single/ Bi-metallic	Metal	Shape	Diameter	Minted in Year
Denomination	Obverse	Reverse	Single/ Bi-metallic	Metal	Shape	Diameter	Minted in Year
₹10 Ten rupees	observe	reverse	Bimetallic	Center: Copper-Nickel Ring: Aluminium-Bronze	Circular	27 mm	2011 - 2019
₹5 Five Rupees	observe	reverse	Singlemetallic	Nickel-brass	Circular	23 mm	2011 - 2019
₹2 Two Rupees	observe	reverse	Singlemetallic	Stainless steel	Circular	25 mm	2011 - 2019
₹1 One Rupee	obverse	reverse	Singlemetallic	Stainless steel	Circular	21.93 mm	2011 - 2019
50p Fifty paise	observe	reverse	Singlemetallic	Stainless steel	Circular	19 mm	2011

=== 2019 Grain Series ===
The Ministry of Finance has issued a notification on March 6 announcing the launch of 5 new coins in the country, namely the new ₹1, ₹2, ₹5, ₹10 and ₹20. The new series of coins are accessible to those with visual impairments and have an enhanced design. The coins were launched by Prime Minister Narendra Modi and Finance Minister Arun Jaitley. The design of the coins were prepared by the National Institute of Design while Security Printing and Minting Corporation of India Limited and the Ministry of Finance played the key role in the introduction of new coins in the country.

Various new features have been incorporated in the new series of circulation coins to make them more easy for the visually impaired people to use. The coins are characterized by increasing size and weight from lower to higher denominations from ₹1 to ₹20. All of the denominations would be of round shape, except the newly included coin of ₹20, which will be a 12 sided coin with no serrations.

2019 Grain Series
Denomination	Image		Single/ Bi-metallic	Metal	Shape	Diameter	Minted in Year
Denomination	Obverse	Reverse	Single/ Bi-metallic	Metal	Shape	Diameter	Minted in Year
₹20; Twenty Rupees			Bimetallic	Center: Nickel-brass Ring: Nickel silver	Dodecagonal	27 mm	2019
₹10 Ten Rupees			Bimetallic	Center: Copper-Nickel Ring: Aluminium-Bronze	Circular	27 mm	2019
₹5 Five Rupees			Singlemetallic	Nickel-brass	Circular	25 mm	2019
₹2 Two Rupees			Singlemetallic	Stainless steel	Circular	23 mm	2019
₹1 One Rupee			Singlemetallic	Stainless steel	Circular	20 mm	2019

== Mints ==
Each currency coin minted in India (and anywhere in the world) has a special mint mark on it to identify the mint.

=== Domestic Mint Marks ===
List of Indian Mints
Mint	Year of Establishment	Mint Mark	Note
Kolkata Mint	1757	no mint mark beneath the date of the coin	
Hyderabad Mint	1803	★ beneath the date of the coin	also split diamond or a dot in diamond on some coins
Mumbai Mint	1829	◆ beneath the date of the coin	"B" or "M" in proof sets.
Noida Mint	1988	● beneath the date of the coin	

=== Foreign Mint Marks ===
Due to the increasing demand for the circulation of coins, the Indian government was forced to mint coins in foreign countries at various points in the country's history.

List of coins minted in foreign mint
Mint	Country	Year	Coin	Mint Mark
Birmingham Mint	United Kingdom	1985	₹1.00	'H' below last digit of the year
Royal Mint	United Kingdom	1985	₹1.00	'◆' below first digit of the year
Taegu Mint	South Korea	1985	₹0.50	'★' below first digit of the year
Royal Canadian Mint	Canada	1985	₹0.25	'C' below mid of the year
Royal Canadian Mint	Canada	1988	₹0.10, ₹0.25, ₹0.50	'C' below mid of the year
Mexican Mint	Mexico	1997	₹1.00	below mid of the year
Seoul Mint	South Korea	1997, 1998	₹2.00	'★' below last digit of the year
Kremnica Mint	Slovakia	1998, 1999, 2000, 2001	₹1.00	below mid of the year
Pretoria Mint	South Africa	1998	₹2.00	(M) below mid of the year (oval shape)
Tower Mint	United Kingdom	1999	₹2.00	'⊔' below mid of the year
Moscow Mint	Russia	2000	₹2.00	'MMD' below mid of the year
Moscow Mint	Russia	1999, 2000	₹5.00	'MMD' below mid of the year

== Commemorative coins ==
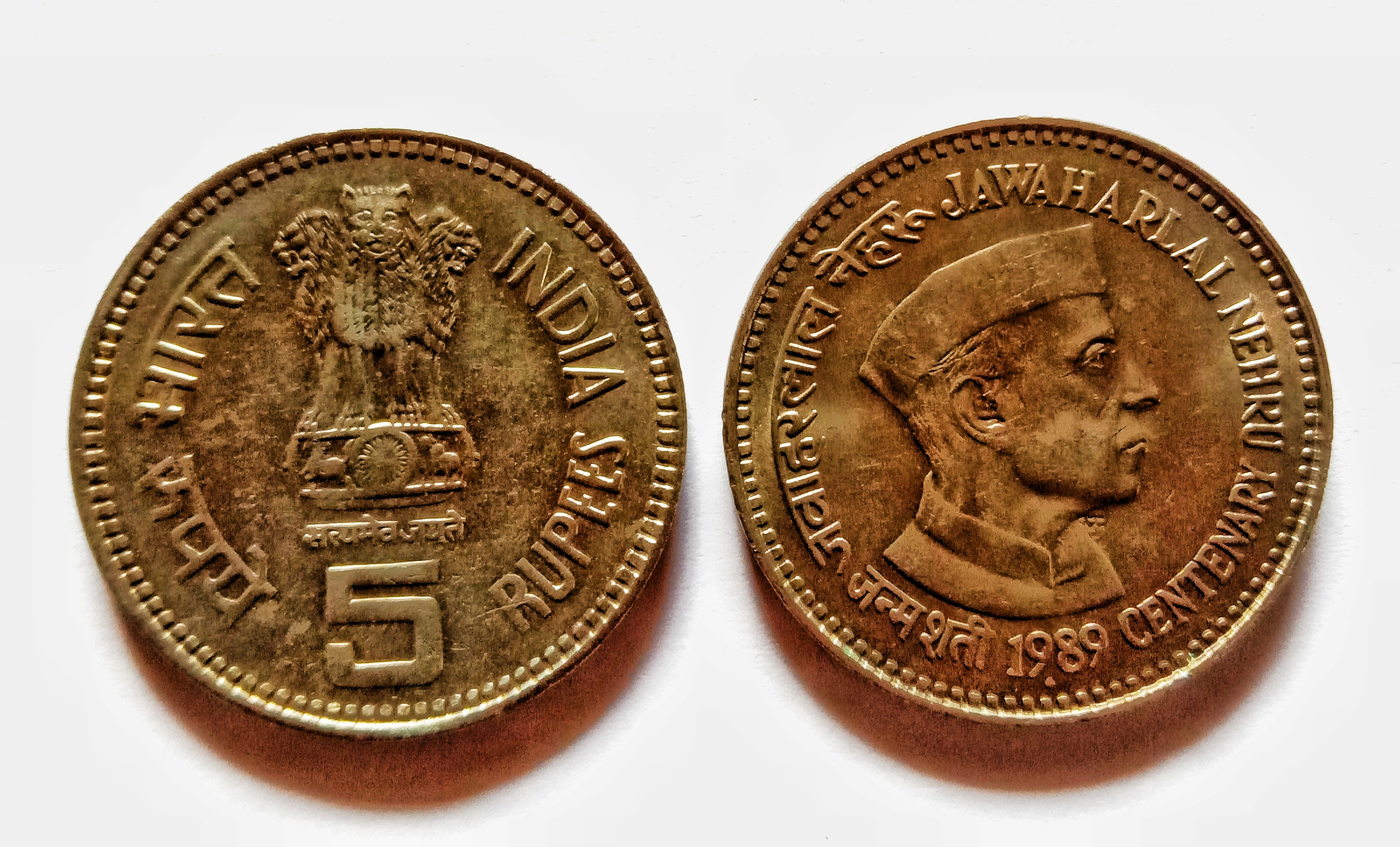
5 Rupees coin commemorating the birth centenary of Jawaharlal Nehru in 1989.

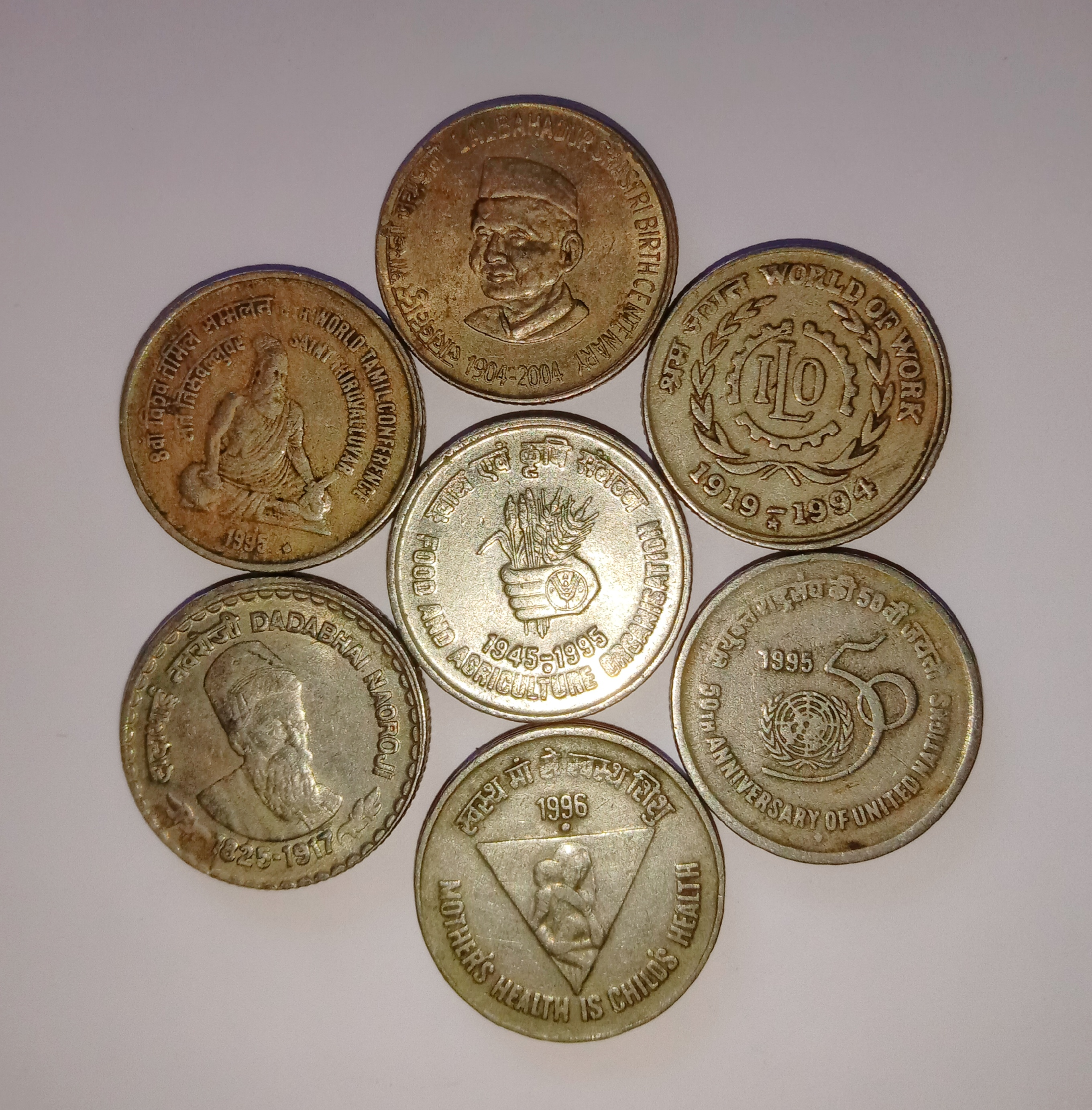
Different commemorative coins of 5 Rupees

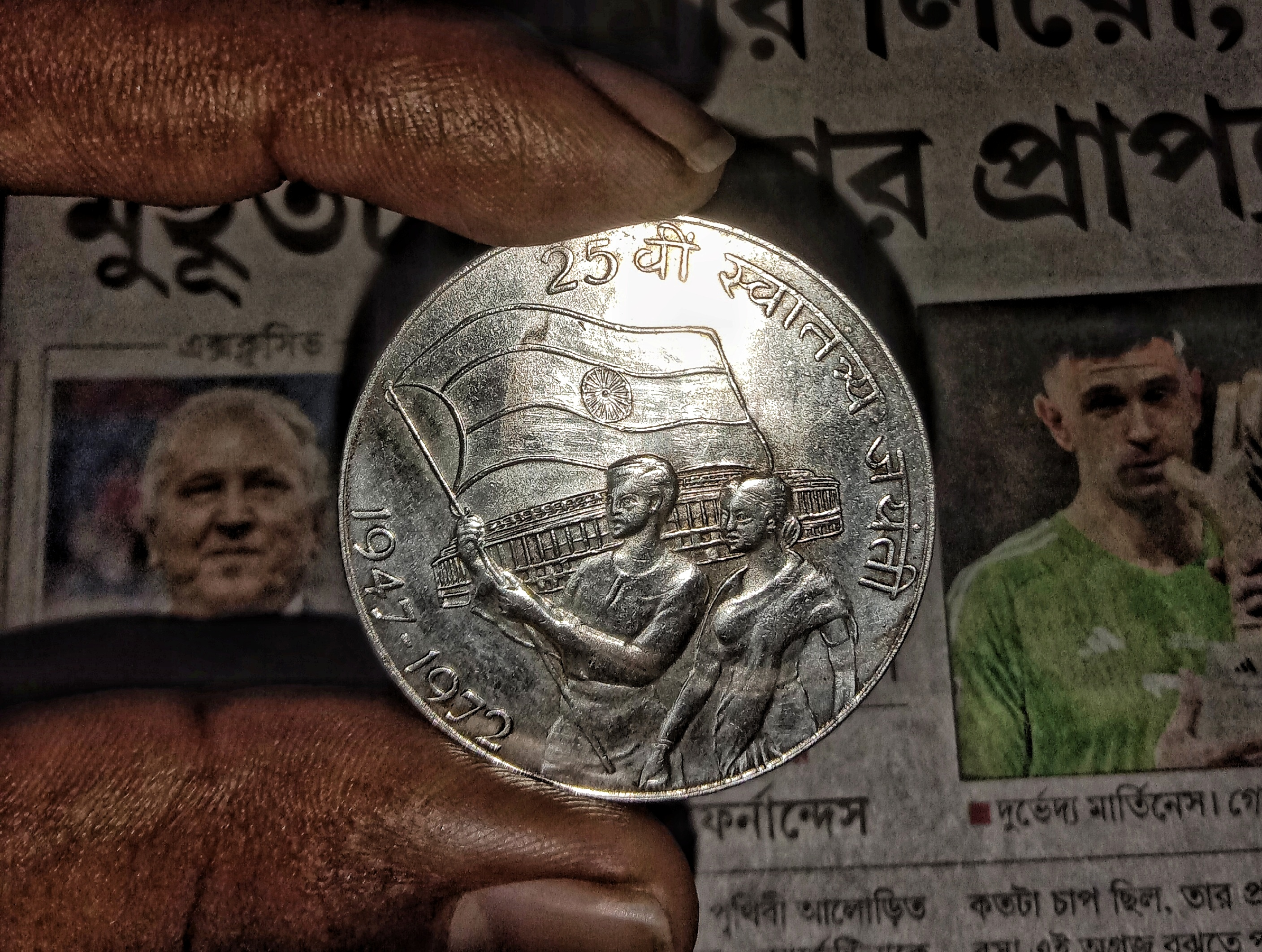
10 Rupees silver coin of India 1972 (25 years of India's independence)

The first Indian commemorative coin was issued in 1964 in remembrance of Jawaharlal Nehru's birth anniversary. Since then, numerous coins from 5 paise (INR 0.05) to ₹1000 (INR 1000.00) have been issued. These coins based on birth or death centenary of famous personalities or on recently dead, commemoration of special government programs or sport events, anniversaries of historical incidents, government organisation etc.

=== List of Commemorative Coins ===
Commemorative	Year	5p	10p	20p	25p	50p	₹1	₹2	₹5	₹10	₹20	₹25	₹50	₹60	₹75	₹100	₹125	₹150	₹200	₹500	₹1000
Jawaharlal Nehru	1964					KM	KM														
Mahatma Gandhi	1969			KHM		KM	KM			KM											
Food For All	1970			KM						KM											
Food For All	1971			KM						M											
25 Years of Independence	1972					KM				KM											
Grow More Food	1973					KM				M	M										
Planned Families, Food For All	1974		KHM																		
Women's Year	1975		KHM							M			M								
Food & Work For All	1976	KHM	KM							M			M								
Save For Development	1977	KHM	KM							M			M								
Food & Shelter For All	1978	KHM	KHM							M			M								
International Year of the Child (P)	1978															M					
International Year of the Child	1979	KHM	KHM							M			M			M					
Rural Women's Advancement	1980		KHM		KHM					M						M					
World Food Day	1981		KM		KHM					M						M					
IX Asian Games	1982		KHM		KHM			KM		M						M					
World Food Day	1982		KHM	KH																	
National Integration	1982					KM		KM		M						M					
Fisheries	1983			KH																	
Forestry For Development	1985				KHM																
Reserve Bank of India	1985					KHM				M											
Indira Gandhi	1985					KHM			HM		M										
International Youth Year	1985						KHM			K						M					
Fisheries	1986					KHM					M					M					
Small Farmer	1987						KHM				M					M					
Rainfed Farming	1988						KHM														
Jawaharlal Nehru	1989						KHM		HM		M					M					
World Food Day	1989						KHM														
B. R. Ambedkar	1990						HM														
Integrated Child Development Services	1990						HM														
SAARC Year - Girl Child	1990						HM														
Food For the Future	1990						KH														
Rajiv Gandhi	1991						HM														
Commonwealth Parliamentary Association	1991						M														
Tourism Year	1991						HM														
Food & Nutrition	1992						K														
Land Vital Resource	1992							K													
Quit India Movement	1993						KHM			M			M			M					
Inter Parliamentary Union	1993						M														
Small Family Happy Family	1993							HM													
Bio Diversity	1993							HM													
International Year of the Family	1994						MN														
Water For Life	1994							KHM													
International Labour Organization	1994								HMN				M			M					
World Tamil Conference, Thiruvalluvar	1995						KHMN	M	MN												
Globalizing Indian Agriculture	1995							KM													
United Nations	1995								MN												
Food and Agriculture Organization	1995								HMN												
Vallabhbhai Patel	1996							KHMN		M			M			M					
Mother's Health is Child's Health	1996								KHMN												
International Crop Science	1996								K												
Subhash Chandra Bose	1996							KN													
Subhash Chandra Bose	1997							KHMN		M			M			M					
50 Years of Independence	1997					KHMN							M								
Cellular Jail	1997						KHMN														
Sri Aurobindo	1998							KMN		M			M			M					
Chittaranjan Das	1998							KHN					K								
Dnyaneshwar	1999						KMN									M					
Shivaji	1999							KHMN					M			M					
Supreme Court of India	2000							KMN					M								
Syama Prasad Mookerjee	2001							KHN		K			M			K					
Bhagwan Mahavir Janma Kalyanak	2001								MN							M					
Jayaprakash Narayan	2002						HM														
Tukaram	2002							KHMN		K			M			M					
Maharana Pratap	2003						HM			M						M					
Durgadas	2003						HM			M						M					
Indian Railway	2003							KHMN								K					
Dadabhai Naoroji	2003								KHM												
K. Kamaraj	2004								KHM							M					
India Post	2004						K									K					
Telecommunication	2004							K								K					
Lal Bahadur Shastri (CuNi)	2004								K							K					
Lal Bahadur Shastri (SS)	2004								KHM												
Dandi March (CuNi)	2005								M							M					
Dandi March (SS)	2005								M												
Basaveshwara (CuNi)	2006								M							M					
Basaveshwara (SS)	2006								M												
Oil and Natural Gas Corporation (CuNi)	2006								K				M								
Oil and Natural Gas Corporation (SS)	2006								KH												
Narayana Guru (CuNi)	2006								M							M					
Narayana Guru (SS)	2006								M												
State Bank of India (CuNi)	2006								K							K					
State Bank of India (SS)	2006								KH												
Indian Air Force	2007							K								K					
Bal Gangadhar Tilak (CuNi)	2007								M							K					
Bal Gangadhar Tilak (SS)	2007								M												
First War of Independence	2007								M							M					
Khadi & Village Industries (CuNi)	2007								M				M								
Khadi & Village Industries (SS)	2007								M												
Bhagat Singh	2007								KH							K					
Guru Granth Sahib	2008									HM						M					
Saint Alphonsa	2009								KHM							M					
Louis Braille	2009							KHM								K					
C. N. Annadurai	2009								KHM							K					
60 Years of Commonwealth	2009								KHM							M					
Rajendra Prasad	2009								KHMN							K					
Homi J. Bhabha	2009									MN						M					
Reserve Bank of India	2010						HM	KHM	HM	HMN					KMHN						
XIX Commonwealth Games	2010							KHN	KHMN												
C. Subramaniam	2010								KHMN							HM					
Brihadeeswarar Temple, Thanjavur	2010								KHMN												M
Mother Teresa	2010								KHMN							K					
Comptroller & Auditor General	2010								KHMN									K			
Civil Aviation	2010															H					
Income Tax - Chanakya	2011								KHMN									K			
Civil Aviation	2011								KHMN							M					
Rabindranath Tagore	2011								KHMN									K			
Indian Council of Medical Research	2011								KHMN							HM					
Madan Mohan Malviya	2011								KHMN									M			
Parliament of India	2012								M	MN											
Vaishno Devi Shrine Board	2012								HMN	HMN		M									
Kolkata Mint	2012								KHMN					K							
Motilal Nehru	2012								KHMN									M			
Kuka Movement	2013								KHMN							M					
Swami Vivekananda	2013								KHMN									K			
Coir Board	2013									KHMN				M							
Tulsidas	2014								KHMN		M										
Abul Kalam Azad	2014								KHMN		K										
Jawaharlal Nehru	2014								KHMN								K				
Komagata Maru Incident	2014								HMN												
Jamshetji Tata	2015								KM												
Begum Akhtar	2015								KM							K					
Rani Gaidinliu	2015								KH												
1965 Operation	2015								M				M								
Bharat Heavy Electricals Limited	2015								KHM				K								
Biju Patnaik	2015								K							K					
B. R. Ambedkar	2015									HM							K				
Sarvepalli Radhakrishnan	2015									M							K				
3rd Indo-Africa Forum	2015									K										K	
Maharana Pratap	2015									M						M					
Swami Chinmayananda	2015									KM						K					
Mahatma Gandhi's Return From South Africa	2015									KHMN											
International Yoga Day	2015									MN											
Nabakalebara Rath Yatra	2015									M											M
Allahabad High Court	2016								HM									M			
University of Mysore	2016								M							M					
Lala Lajpat Rai	2016									K											
Tantya Tope	2016									K									K		
Banaras Hindu University	2016									M						M					
National Archives of India	2016									K							K				
Deendayal Upadhyaya	2016								M							M					
Biju Patnaik	2016								KH							M					
Chaitanya Mahaprabhu	2016								M											M	
Shrimad Rajchandra	2017									M								M			
M. S. Subbulakshmi	2017									M						M					
P. C. Mahalanobis	2018								K							M					
75 Years of Tricolour	2018														M						
Atal Bihari Vajpayee	2018															M					
Paika Rebellion	2018																		M		
Jallianwala Bagh Massacre	2019															K					
M. G. Ramachandran	2019								M							M					
75 Years of Independence	2022							M													
Ramakrishna Mission	2023																K				
Kalaignar M. Karunanidhi	2024															H					

Note: Bold Marks are Silver Coins, Mint index: K = Kolkata (no mark), H = Hyderabad (⋆), M = Mumbai (◆ or B), Noida = (●).

== Controversy ==
=== Controversy over 2006 two-rupee coin ===
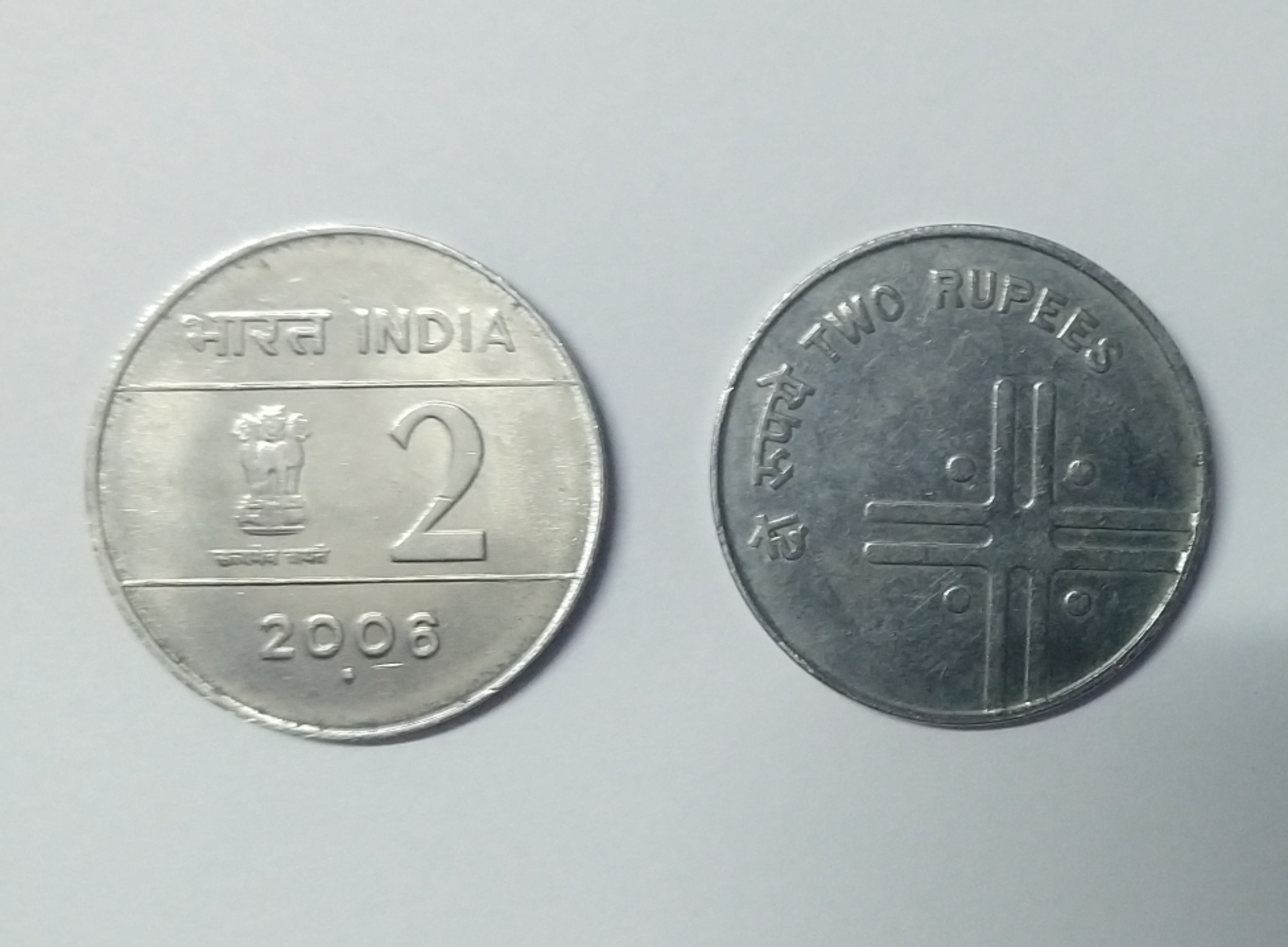
The 2006 two-rupee coin

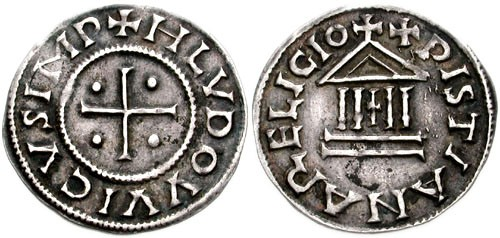
denier of Louis

The two-rupee coin issued from 2006 by the Reserve Bank, in stark contrast to the earlier coin, is rounded and simpler in design, without the map of India. The coin has already been criticized for being difficult to recognize by the visually impaired.

Most controversially, it features an equal-armed cross with the beams divided into two rays and with dots between adjacent beams. According to RBI, this design represents "four heads sharing a common body" under a new "unity in diversity" theme.

However, Hindu nationalists have charged that the symbol is a Christian cross resembling the symbol on the deniers issued by Louis the Pious.

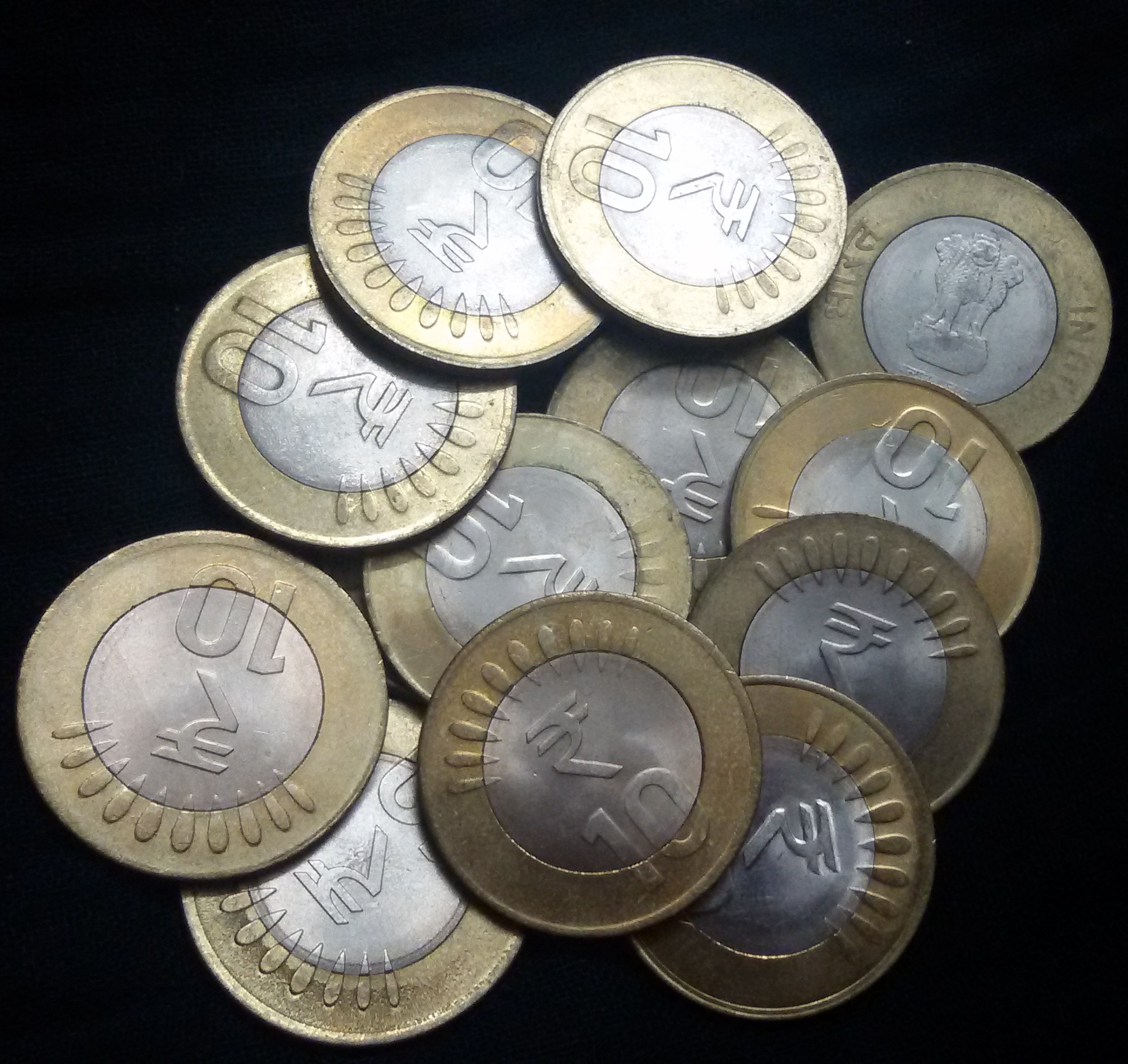
10 Rupees bimetallic coins.

== See also ==
- Indian rupee
- Coinage of India
- Banknotes of the Indian rupee
