= Indian 50-paisa coin =

Denomination of the Indian rupee

Fifty paise
- India
- Value: 50 (1/2 ₹)
- Mass: 2.9 g
- Diameter: 19 mm (0.75 in)
- Thickness: 1.5 mm (0.06 in)
- Edge: Reeded
- Composition: Nickel (1957-1971); Cupronickel (1972-1990); Stainless steel (1988-2011)
- Years of minting: 1957–2011
- Mint marks: Mumbai = ⧫ Mumbai Proof issues = B Hyderabad = * Noida = ° Kolkata = No mint-mark
- Circulation: In circulation
- Catalog number: KM#398, KM#374 and KM#70 to KM#55

Obverse
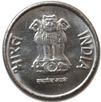
- Design: State Emblem of India with country name

Reverse
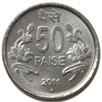
- Design: Face value and year flanked by National flower of India

The paisa symbol.

The Indian 50 paisa coin, popularly called Athanni, is a denomination of the Indian rupee, equal to half a rupee, that is very rarely found in everyday circulation. Currently it is the lowest circulating denomination of the Indian rupee. On 30 June 2011, when the 25 paisa and all other lower denomination coins were officially demonetised, the 50 paise coin became the lowest circulating denomination of the Indian rupee.

== History ==
Prior to 1957, the Indian rupee was not decimalised. From 1835 to 1957, the rupee was divided into 16 annas. Each anna was further divided into four Indian paises (pice) and each paise into three pies till 1947 when the pie was demonetised. In 1955, the Parliament of India amended the "Indian Coinage Act" to adopt the decimal system for coinage. Paisa coins were introduced in 1957, but from 1957 to 1964 the coin was called "Naya Paisa" (English: New Paisa). On 1 June 1964, the term "Naya" was dropped and the denomination was simply called "One paisa". Paisa coins were issued as a part of "The Decimal Series". Unlike the demonetization of the paisa currency in June 2011, the 50 paisa coin continued to be minted until 1 October 2011. In 2019, new coin designs were adopted, but the 50 paise coin was not updated, as it had already ceased to be in common circulation.

== Gallery ==
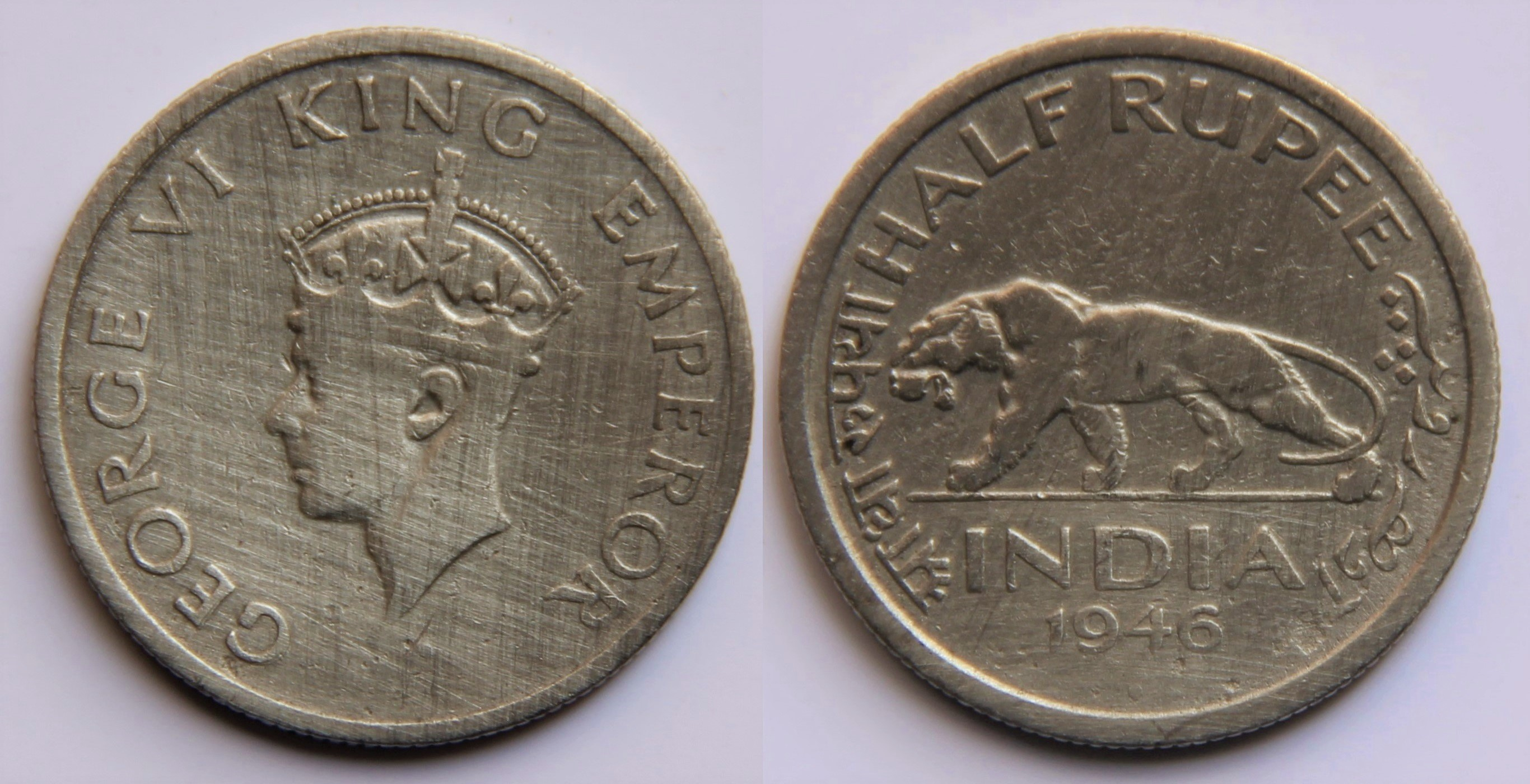
A 50 paise coin from 1946

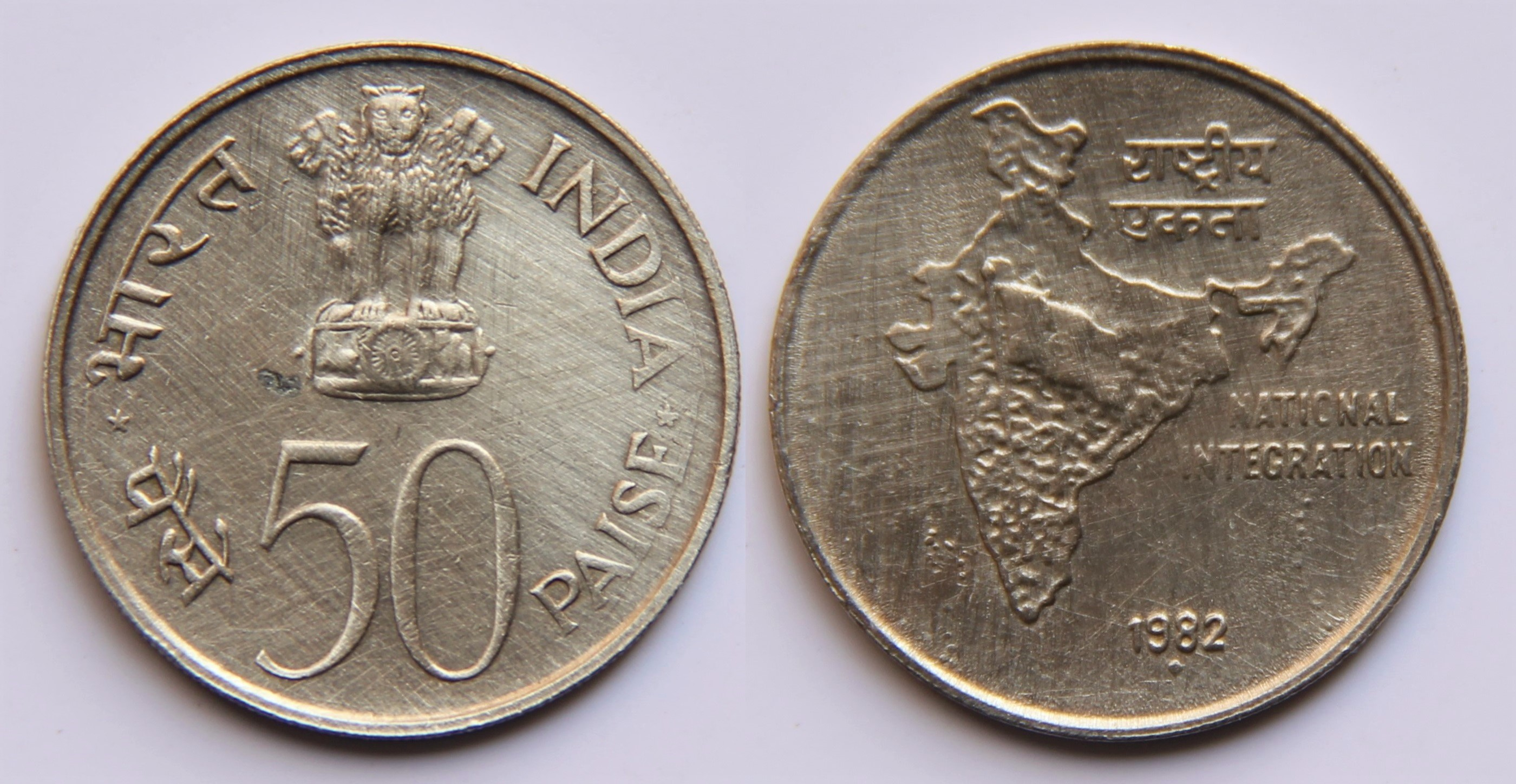
A 50 paise coin from 1982

== See also ==
- Indian paisa
- Coins of the Indian rupee
