= Indian 5-paisa coin =

Former denomination of the Indian Rupee

Five paise
- India
- Value: 5 (1/20₹)
- Mass: 1.03 g (15.9 gr)
- Diameter: 22 mm (0.87 in)
- Thickness: 1.5 mm (0.06 in)
- Composition: Cupronickel; Aluminium & Aluminium-magnesium
- Years of minting: 1964–1994
- Mintage: 4,924,011,110.
- Mint marks: ⧫ = Mumbai; B = Mumbai proof issue * = Hyderabad; No mark = Kolkata
- Circulation: Demonetized
- Catalog number: KM 17, KM 18.1 to 18.6; KM 19, 20, 21, 22 & 23

Obverse
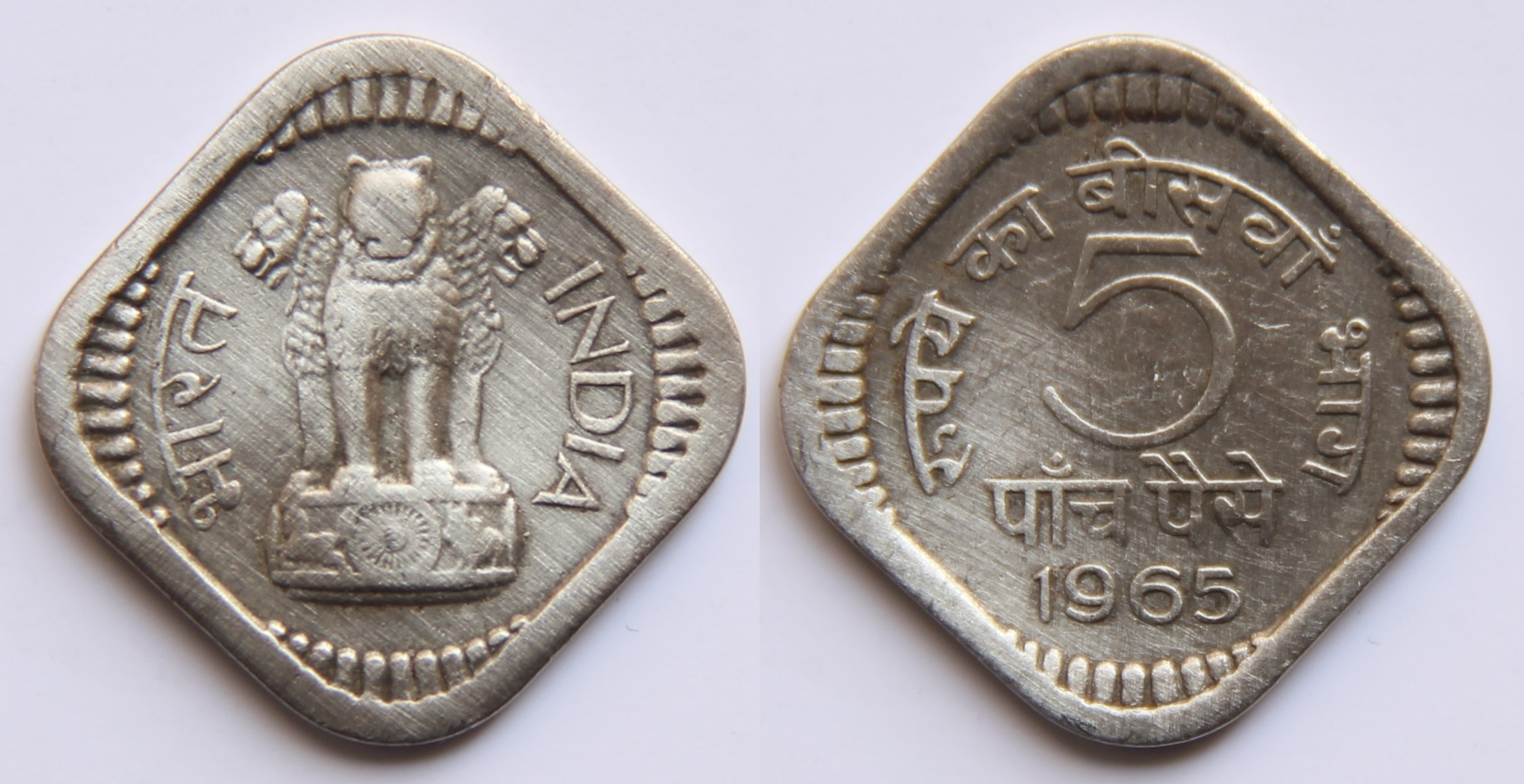
- Design: State Emblem of India with country name.

Reverse
- Design: Face value and year.

The Indian five paise (Hindi: पाँच पैसे) (singular: Paisa), is former denomination of the Indian Rupee. The 5 coin equals 1/20 of the Indian Rupee. The symbol for paisa is.

== History ==
Prior to 1957, the Indian rupee was not decimalised and the rupee from 1835 to 1957 AD was further divided into 16 annas. Each anna was further divided to four Indian pices and each pice into three Indian pies till 1947 when the pie was demonetized. In 1955, India amended the "Indian Coinage Act" to adopt the metric system for coinage. Paisa coins were introduced in 1957, but from 1957 to 1964 the coin was called "Naya Paisa" (English: New Paisa. Plural: Naye paise). On 1 June 1964, the term "Naya" was dropped and the denomination was simply called "One paisa" (or paise for denomination greater than one). Paisa coins were issued as a part of "The Decimal Series". Five paise coins were minted from 1964 to 1984. 5 paise was equivalent to four-fifths of an anna (0.8 anna).

== Mintage ==
Five paise coins were minted from 1961 to 1984 at the India Government Mints in Mumbai, Kolkata and Hyderabad. The coins were demonetized in 1994.

=== Mint marks ===
Depending on the mint producing the coins, following mint marks appear:

Mint	Mark	Description	Comments
Hyderabad	☆	Five-pointed star	
Kolkata		No mint-mark	Since this was the first Indian mint, coins minted in Kolkata don't carry a mark.
Mumbai	⧫	Diamond	
Mumbai	•	Small dot (solid)	
Mumbai	B	Letter B below year	
Mumbai	M	Letter M below year	On coins minted after 1996.
Noida	°	Small dot (hollow)	

=== Total mintage ===
Total 4,924,011,110 coins were minted from 1964 to 1994.

=== Composition ===
Five paise coins were minted from Cupronickel, Aluminium and Aluminium-magnesium in medallic alignment. The coins were rhombus shaped and had smooth edge.

- 1964-1966: Cupronickel.
- 1967-1984: Aluminium.
- 1984-1994: Aluminium-magnesium.

== Variants ==
5 paise coin variants (1964-1994).
Image		KM#	Technical parameters				Description			Year of minting		Comments
Obverse	Reverse	KM#	Weight	Diameter	Thickness	Metal	Edge	Obverse	Reverse	First	Last	Comments
		17	4.05 g	22 mm	2.2 mm	Cupronickel	Smooth	State Emblem of India & country name in Hindi and English.	Face-value, year and lettering रूपये का बीसवाँ भाग; (E: 20th part of a rupee)	1964	1966	
		18.1	1.6 g	22 mm	2.2 mm	Aluminium	Smooth	State Emblem of India & country name in Hindi and English.	Face-value, year and lettering रूपये का बीसवाँ भाग; (E: 20th part of a rupee)	1967	1967	Number 5 on reverse smaller in size.
		18.2	1.6 g	22 mm	2.2 mm	Aluminium	Smooth	State Emblem of India & country name in Hindi and English.	Face-value, year and lettering रूपये का बीसवाँ भाग; (E: 20th part of a rupee)	1967	1971	Arms type 1. Number 5 on reverse larger in size.
		18.3	1.6 g	22 mm	2.2 mm	Aluminium	Smooth	State Emblem of India & country name in Hindi and English.	Face-value, year and lettering रूपये का बीसवाँ भाग; (E: 20th part of a rupee)	1967	1971	Arms type 2. Number 5 on reverse larger in size.
		18.4	1.53 g	22 mm	2.0 mm	Aluminium	Smooth	State Emblem of India & country name in Hindi and English.	Face-value, year and lettering.	1972	1972	Hindi lettering on reverse omitted.
		18.5	1.53 g	22 mm	2.0 mm	Aluminium	Smooth	State Emblem of India & country name in Hindi and English.	Face-value, year and lettering.	1973	1978	Arms type 1. Number 5 on reverse larger in size.
		18.6	1.53 g	22 mm	2.0 mm	Aluminium	Smooth	State Emblem of India & country name in Hindi and English.	Face-value, year and lettering.	1972	1984	Arms type 2. Number 5 on reverse larger in size.
		23a	1.03 g	22 mm	1.5 mm	Aluminium- magnesium	Smooth	State Emblem of India & country name in Hindi and English.	Face-value, year and lettering.	1984	1994	Lightest 5 paise coin.

== See also ==
- Indian paisa
