= Indian 3-paisa coin =

Former denomination of the Indian rupee

Three paise
- India
- Value: 3 (3/100₹)
- Mass: 1.25 g (19.3 gr)
- Diameter: 21 mm (0.83 in)
- Thickness: 2.0 mm (0.079 in)
- Edge: Smooth
- Composition: Aluminium
- Years of minting: 1964-1971
- Mintage: 1,612,704,568
- Mint marks: ⧫ = Mumbai; B = Mumbai proof issue * = Hyderabad ⟐ = Hyderabad; No mark = Kolkata
- Circulation: Demonetized
- Catalog number: KM# 14.1 & 14.2

Obverse
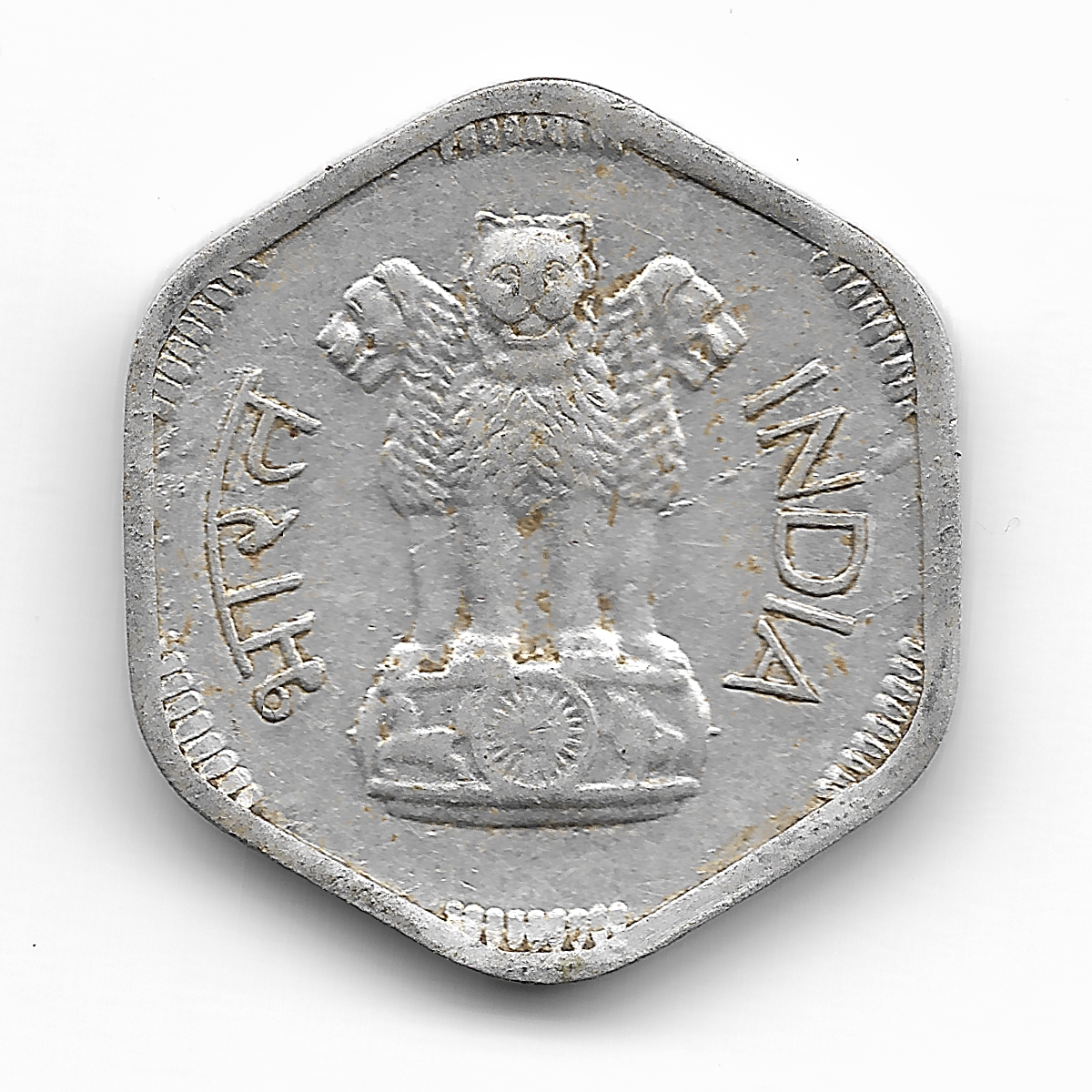
- Design: State Emblem of India with country name.

Reverse
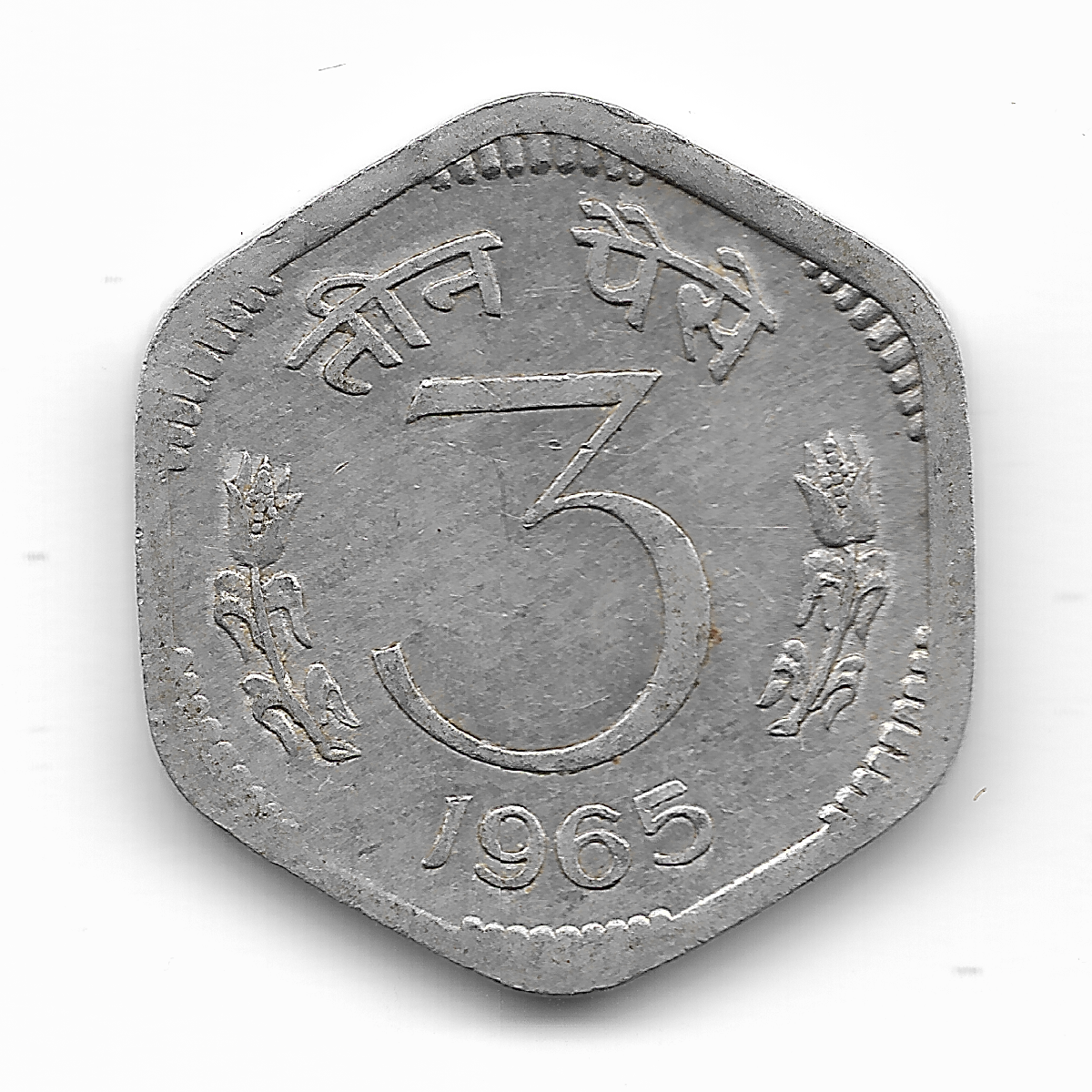
- Design: Face value and year of minting

The Indian Three paise (Hindi: तीन पैसे) (singular: Paisa), is a former denomination of the Indian Rupee. The 3 coin equals 3/100 of the Indian Rupee. The symbol for paisa is.

== History ==
Prior to 1957, the Indian rupee was not decimalised and the rupee from 1835 to 1957 AD was further divided into 16 annas. Each anna was further divided to four Indian pices and each pice into three pies till 1947 when the pie was demonetised. In 1955, India amended the "Indian Coinage Act" to adopt the metric system for coinage. Paisa coins were introduced in 1957, but from 1957 to 1964 the coin was called "Naya Paisa" (English: New Paisa). On 1 June 1964, the term "Naya" was dropped and the denomination was simply called "One paisa". Paisa coins were issued as a part of "The Decimal Series".

== Mintage ==
Three paise coins were minted from 1964 to 1971 at the India Government mint in Bombay (present day Mumbai) and Calcutta (present day Kolkata). Coins borne ⧫ (small dot/diamond) symbol for Mumbai and no mint mark for Kolkata mint. Three paise coins have been demonetized.

=== Total mintage ===
Total 1,612,704,568 coins were minted from 1964 to 1971.

=== Composition ===
Three paise coins were minted from aluminium in medallic alignment. Coins weighed 1.25 grams, had a diameter of 21 millimetres (0.83 in) and thickness of 2 millimetres (0.079 in). Three paise coins were hexagonal shaped and had smooth edge.

== Variants ==
Variants (1964–1971).
Image		Value	Technical parameters				Description			Year of minting		Monetary status
Obverse	Reverse	Value	Weight	Diameter	Thickness	Metal	Edge	Obverse	Reverse	First	Last	Monetary status
		3	1.25 g	21 mm	2.0 mm	Aluminium	Smooth	State Emblem of India & country name in Hindi and English.	Face-value and year.	1964	1971	Demonetized.

== See also ==
- Indian paisa
