= Indian 10-rupee coin =

Indian coin

Ten rupees
- India
- Value: ₹10
- Mass: 7.74 g
- Diameter: 27 mm
- Edge: 100 reeds
- Composition: Outer ring – Nickel-brass; Center – Nickel silver
- Years of minting: 2005 – present

Obverse
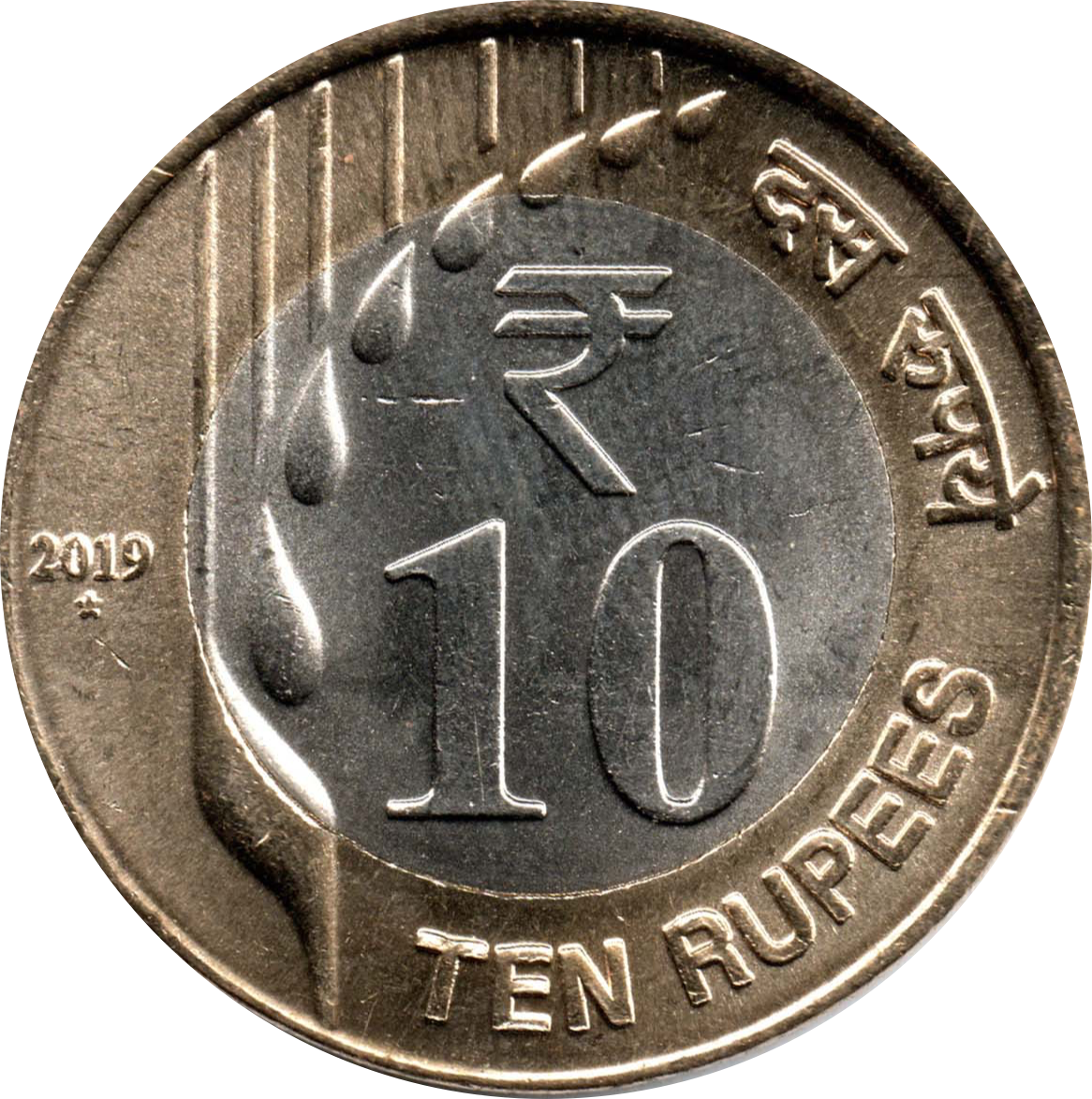
- Designer: RBI
- Design date: 2019

Reverse
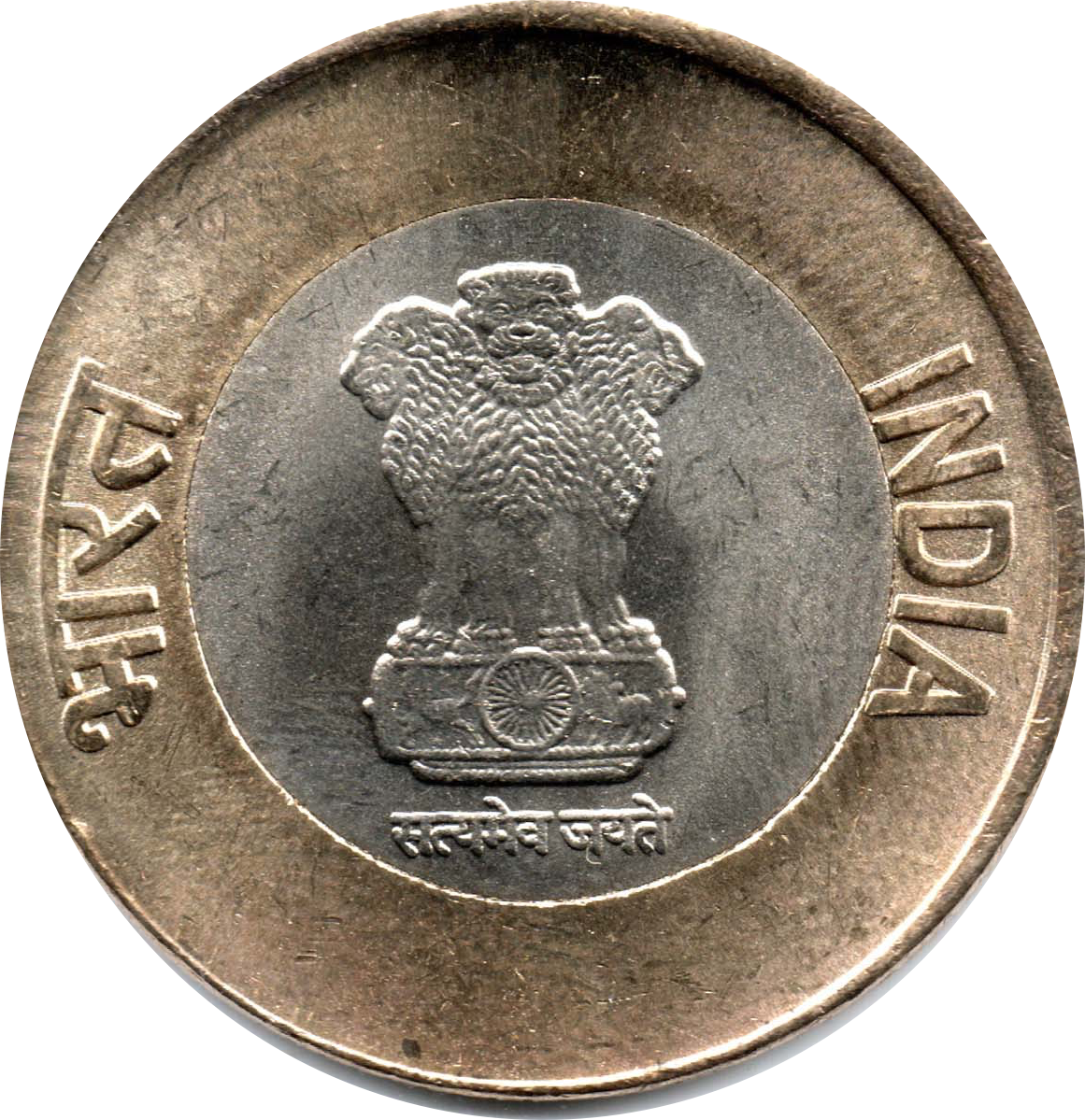
- Designer: RBI
- Design date: 2019

The Indian 10-rupee coin (₹10) is a denomination of the Indian rupee. The ₹10 coin was the highest-denomination coin minted in India after its introduction in 2005, and remains the second highest-denomination coin minted currently. The present ₹10 coin in circulation is from the 2019 design. However, the previous ₹10 coins minted before 2019 are also legal tender in India. All ₹10 coins containing with and without the rupee currency sign are legal tender, as stated by the Reserve Bank of India. Along with the standard designs, there are 4 different designs for this denomination and this is used alongside the 10 rupee banknote.

== Design ==
=== 2005 design (Unity in Diversity) ===
The first ₹10 coin minted in 2005 had a diameter of 27 mm and featured the lettering "भारत" and "INDIA" on the top, with Lion capital with 'Satyameva Jayate' in Hindi below at left, and the date of mint below it on the obverse. On the reverse of the coin it featured the "Four heads sharing a common body" – cross with a dot in each quadrant in the center, with the lettering "दस रुपये" and "TEN RUPEES" on the outer ring.

=== 2008 design (Connectivity & Technology) ===
The second design featured two horizontal lines. The coin featured the lettering "भारत" and "INDIA" on the top, with Lion Capital in the middle and year of printing at bottom on the obverse. The reverse of the coin featured 15 notches and numeral 10 in the middle and at below line the word Rupees in English and रुपये in Hindi was written.

This coin is rumored to be a fake one due to chaos on social media. However, the Reserve Bank of India (RBI) issued an official statement to address these rumors declaring that the old the design prior to 2011 is valid and is legal tender.

=== 2011 design (New rupee sign) ===
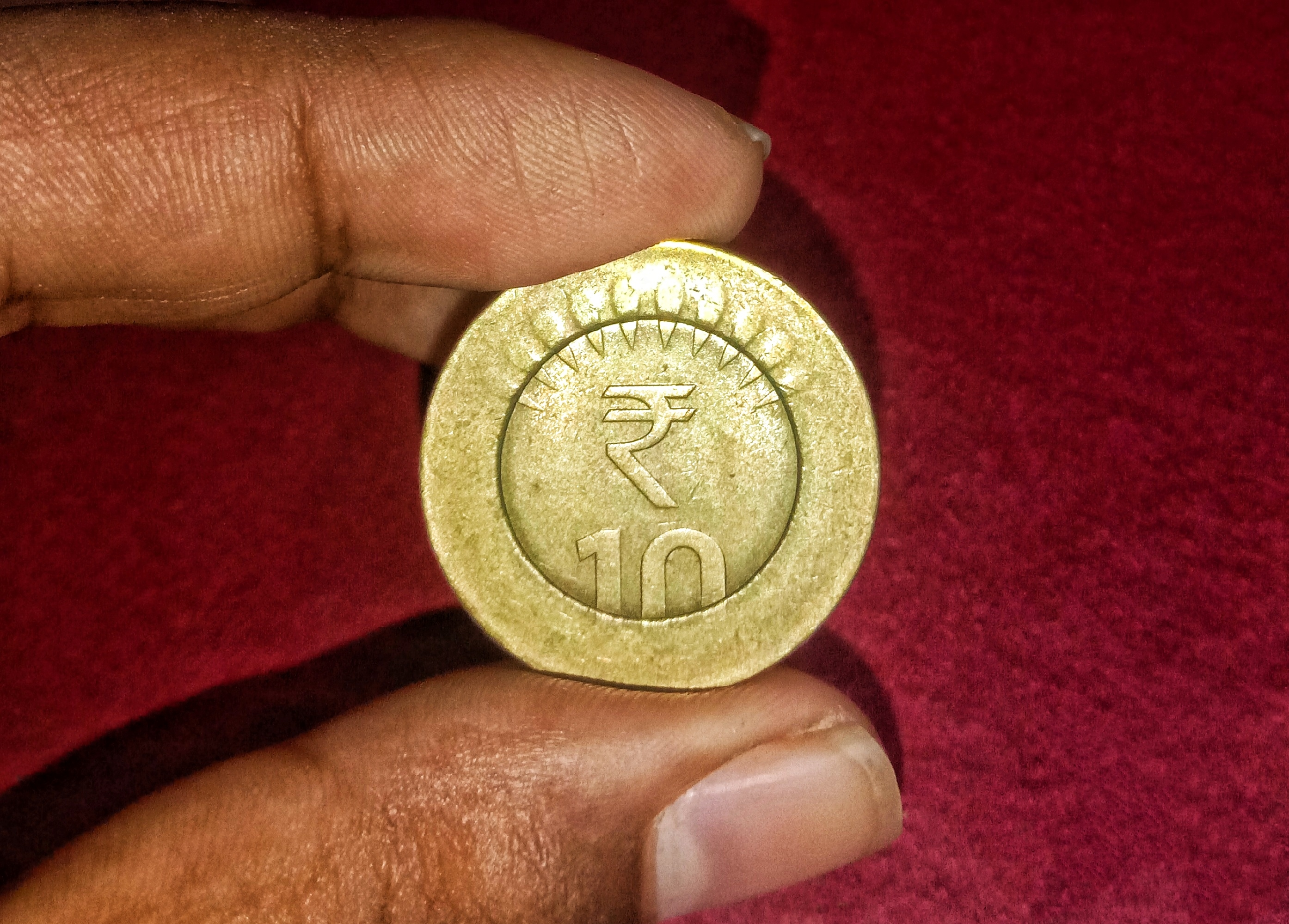
Reverse of a 10 Rupee coin of India in off metal strike (a mint-made error) in full nickel-brass, while the center should be made of nickel-silver to make it a bimetallic coin.

The third design of the ₹10 coin, minted since 2011 features the lettering "भारत" on left and "INDIA" on right on the outer rings, and the year of mint and mint mark below. At the center part of the coin's obverse is the Lion capital with the lettering "सत्यमेव जयते" below it. On the reverse it features 10 notches with the ₹ sign below it, and the number 10 below the ₹ sign. This is the most popular and widely used iteration of the 10 rupee coin.

=== 2019 design (Grain Series) ===
The fourth design of the ₹10 coin, minted since 2019, featured the Lion capital, the lettering "सत्यमेव जयते" in the center plug and the lettering "भारत" on left and "INDIA" on right on the outer ring. On the reverse side of the coin is the number 10 below the ₹ currency sign, the year of issue and eight stylized grain stalks. It was designed with the help of Eemon Roy, a student of National Institute of Design, Ahmedabad.

=== Evolution ===
Denomination	Image		Type	Metal	Shape	Diameter	Minted in Year
Denomination	Obverse	Reverse	Type	Metal	Shape	Diameter	Minted in Year
Rs 10 Ten rupees			Bimetallic	Center: Copper-Nickel Ring: Aluminium-Bronze	Circular	27 mm	2005 - 2007
Rs 10 Ten rupees			Bimetallic	Center: Copper-Nickel Ring: Aluminium-Bronze	Circular	27 mm	2008 - 2010
₹10 Ten rupees			Bimetallic	Center: Copper-Nickel Ring: Aluminium-Bronze	Circular	27 mm	2011 - 2018
₹10 Ten rupees			Bimetallic	Center: Copper-Nickel Ring: Aluminium-Bronze	Circular	27 mm	2019

=== Mintmark ===
The mintmark is featured at the bottom on the obverse of the ₹10 coin.

- ⧫ (small dot/diamond) = Mumbai
- ° (circular dot) = Noida
- ⋆ (star) = Hyderabad
- (no mintmark) = Kolkata

== Fake coin rumour ==
Indian ₹10 coin (2008 Reverse), original design, with 15 radiating lines and without the Indian rupee currency symbol (₹).

In July 2016, some shopkeepers in India were reported to be refusing to accept the ₹10 coin entirely, the result of a rumour circulating on social media. It was initially claimed that coins with a 15 notch reverse design lacking the '₹' symbol were fake, compared to the 10 notch version using the symbol introduced in 2011.

It was later clarified by the Reserve Bank of India (RBI) that the alleged "fake coin" was the earlier 2008 design, which predated the adoption of the '₹' symbol in 2010, and was still in legal circulation, along with the 2011 design and those refusing to accept it could face legal action.

In February 2018, the Reserve Bank of India began an awareness campaign of sending SMS text messages about the ₹10 coins with 10 and 15 radiating lines. Both are valid.

== See also ==
- Modern Indian coins
- Indian 10-rupee note
