= 2 naye paise =

Unit of currency that is 2/100 that of the Indian rupee

Two naye paise दो नए पैसे
- India
- Value: 2/100 Indian rupee
- Mass: 2.95 g (45.5 gr)
- Diameter: 18 mm (0.71 in)
- Thickness: 1.80 mm (0.071 in)
- Edge: Smooth
- Composition: Cupronickel
- Years of minting: 1957
- Mint marks: Mumbai = ⧫
- Circulation: Demonetized
- Catalog number: KM#11

Obverse
- Design: State Emblem of India with country name.

Reverse
- Design: Face value and year of minting

The Indian Two naye paise (Hindi: दो नए पैसे) (singular: Paisa) is a unit of currency equaling 2/100 of the Indian rupee. The symbol for paisa is p.

== History ==
Prior to 1957, the Indian rupee was not decimalised and the rupee from 1835 to 1957 AD was further divided into 16 annas. Each anna was further divided to four Indian pices and each pice into three pies till 1947 when the pie was demonetized. In 1955, India amended the "Indian Coinage Act" to adopt the metric system for coinage. Paisa coins were introduced in 1957, but from 1957 to 1964 the coin was called "Naya Paisa" (English: New Paisa). On 1 June 1964, the term "Naya" was dropped and the denomination was simply called "One paisa". Paisa coins were issued as a part of "The Decimal Series".

== Mintage ==
Two naye paise coins was minted from 1957 to 1963 at the India Government mint in Bombay (present day Mumbai) and borne symbol ⧫ (small dot/diamond) as mint mark. The coin has been demonetized.

=== Total mintage ===
Total 1,826,326,000 coins were minted from 1957 to 1964.

=== Composition ===
Two naye paise coins were minted from Cupronickel alloy in medallic orientation. The coins weighed 2.95 grams, had a diameter of 18 millimetres (0.71 in) and thickness of 1.8 millimetres (0.071 in). Scalloped with eight notches, the coins had smooth edge.

== Variants ==
Variants (1957-1964).
Image		Value	Technical parameters				Description			Year of minting		Monetary status
Obverse	Reverse	Value	Weight	Diameter	Thickness	Metal	Edge	Obverse	Reverse	First	Last	Monetary status
		2 naye paise	2.95 g	18 mm	1.8 mm	Cupronickel	Smooth	State Emblem of India & country name in Hindi and English.	Face-value and year.	1957	1964	Demonetized.

== See also ==
- Indian paisa
