= Indian 2-paisa coin =

Former denomination of the Indian Rupee

Two paisa
- India
- Value: 2 (2/100₹)
- Mass: 2.95 g
- Diameter: 18 mm (0.71 in)
- Thickness: 1.80 mm (0.071 in)
- Edge: Smooth
- Composition: Cupronickel
- Years of minting: 1957–1981
- Mint marks: Mumbai = ⧫
- Circulation: Demonetized (1979)
- Catalog number: KM#12

Obverse
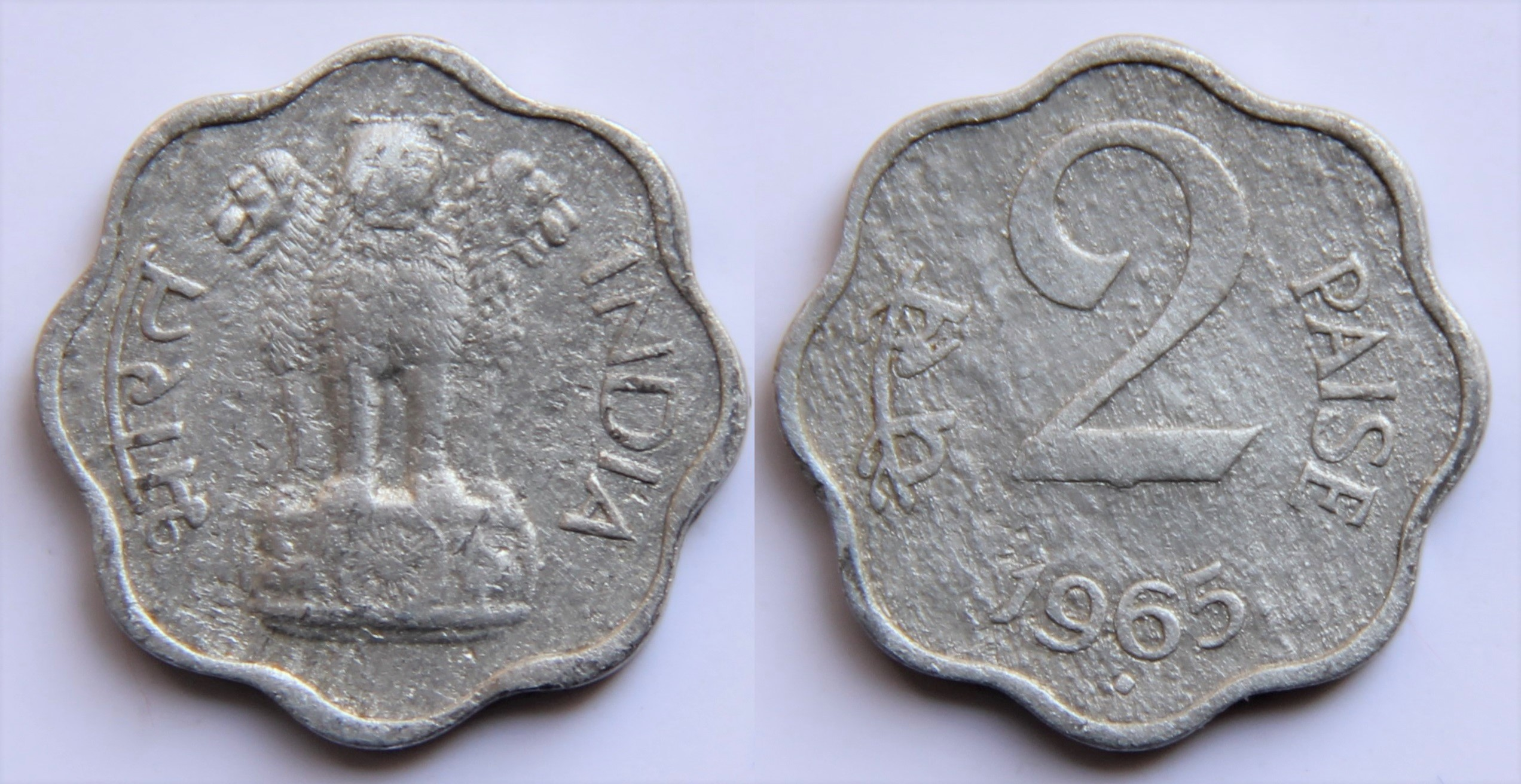
- Design: State Emblem of India with country name.

Reverse
- Design: Face value and year of minting

The Indian Two paise (Hindi: दो पैसे) (singular: Paisa), is a former denomination of the Indian Rupee. The 2 coin equals 1/50 of the Indian Rupee. The symbol for Paisa is.

== History ==
Prior to 1957, the Indian rupee was not decimalised and the rupee from 1835 to 1957 AD was further divided into 16 annas. Each anna was further divided to four Indian pices and each pice into three pies till 1947 when the pie was demonetised. In 1955, India amended the "Indian Coinage Act" to adopt the metric system for coinage. Paisa coins were introduced in 1957, but from 1957 to 1964 the coin was called "Naya Paisa" (English: New Paisa). On 1 June 1964, the term "Naya" was dropped and the denomination was simply called "One paisa". Paisa coins were issued as a part of "The Decimal Series".

== Mintage ==
Two paise coins was minted only in the year 1964 at the India Government mint in Bombay (present day Mumbai) and borne symbol ⧫ (small dot/diamond) as mint mark. The coin was demonetized in 1979.

=== Total mintage ===
Total 323,504,000 coins were minted in 1964.

=== Composition ===
Two paise coins were minted from Cupronickel alloy in medallic orientation. The coins weighed 2.95 grams, had a diameter of 18 millimetres (0.71 in) and thickness of 1.8 millimetres (0.071 in). Scalloped with eight notches, the coins had smooth edge.

== See also ==
- Indian paisa
