= Indian 10-paisa coin =

Coin of the Indian rupee

Ten paise
- India
- Value: 10 (1/10 ₹) Paise
- Mass: (1957-1967) 4.9 (1968-1971) 4.3 (1971-1982) 2.27 (1983-1993) 1.76 (1988-1998) 2 g
- Diameter: ((1957-1971) 0.905512 (1971-1982) 1.0200787 (1974-1982) 1.02362 (1983-1993) 0.90669291 (1988-1998) 0.629921 in)
- Thickness: (1957-1971) 0.0669291 (1971-1982) 0.07559055 (1983-1993) 0.07637795 (1988-1998) 0.05944882 in)
- Edge: smooth
- Shape: scalloped(1957-1993) round(1988-1998)
- Composition: cupronickel(1957-1967) nickel-brass(1968-1971) aluminum(1971-1993) stainless-steel(1988-1998)
- Years of minting: 1957–1998
- Mint marks: Mumbai = ⧫ Mumbai Proof issues = B Hyderabad = * Noida = ° Kolkata = No mint-mark
- Circulation: Demonetised in 2011, See Indian 25-paise coin

Obverse
- Design: State Emblem of India with country name.

Reverse
- Design: Face value and year

The Indian 10 coin is a former denomination of the Indian rupee. The 10 Paise coin equals 1/10 of a rupee. The last issue, minted in stainless steel, was first introduced into circulation in 1988.

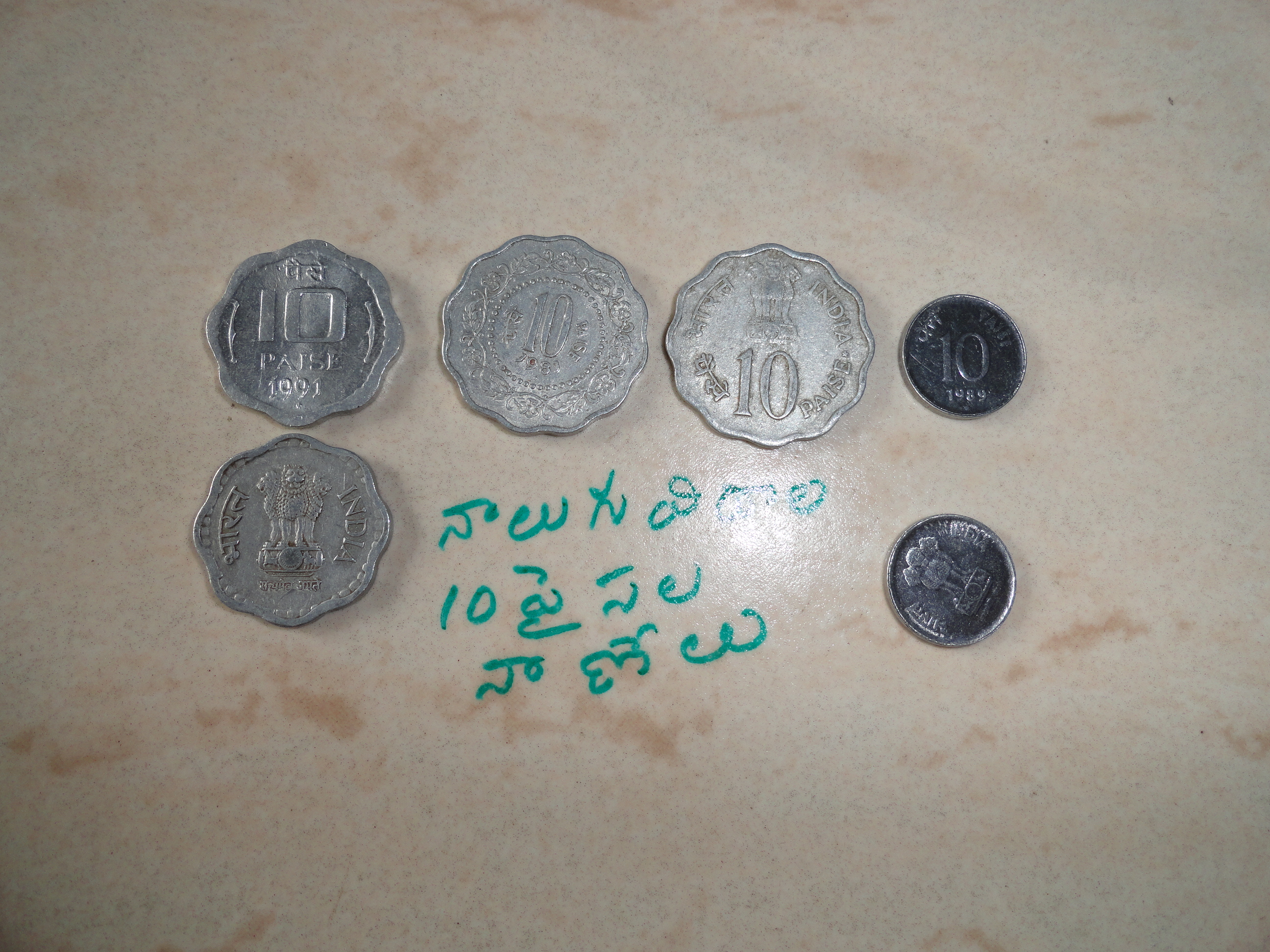
Various 10 paisa coins.
