= Indian 20-rupee coin =

Denomination of the Indian rupee

Twenty rupees
- India
- Value: ₹20
- Mass: 8.65 g
- Diameter: 27 mm
- Thickness: 2.15 mm
- Edge: 12-edged polygon (dodecagon)
- Composition: Outer ring – Nickel silver Center – Nickel-brass
- Years of minting: 2019 – present

Obverse
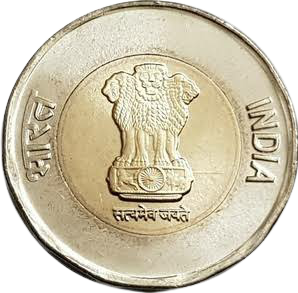
- Design: Lettering of "भारत" on left, "india" on right, Lion capital at centre with the lettering "सत्यमेव जयते" below it.
- Designer: Reserve Bank of India
- Design date: 2020

Reverse
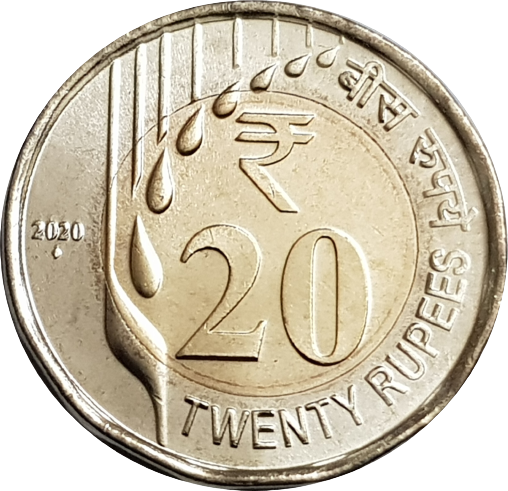
- Design: The number 20 below a ₹ currency sign at centre, eight stylized grain stalks on left, lettering of "बीस रुपये" and "TWENTY RUPEES" on right.
- Designer: Reserve Bank of India
- Design date: 2020

The Indian 20-rupee coin (₹20) is a denomination of the Indian rupee. The ₹20 coin is the highest-denomination circulation coin minted in India since its introduction in 2019. The release of the coin was supposed to be in March 2020, but it was shifted to May 2020 because of the COVID-19 lockdown. This is used alongside the 20 rupee banknote. This coin was released in May 2020 along with the new series of the rupee coins.

== Design ==
The 20 rupee coin has a dodecagonal (12-sided) shape, with a diameter of 27mm and weight of 8.65 grams. The outer ring is composed of 65% copper, 15% zinc and 20% nickel whereas the inner ring (centre piece) is composed of 75% copper, 20% zinc and 5% nickel. The coin was designed with the help of students of National Institute of Design, Ahmedabad.

=== Obverse ===
The obverse, minted since 2019, features the Lion Capital of Ashoka, the lettering "सत्यमेव जयते" in the center plug and the lettering "भारत" on left and "INDIA" on right on the outer ring.

=== Reverse ===
The reverse features the number 20 below the ₹ currency sign in the centre and eight stylized grain stalks on the left periphery. The right periphery bears the text "बीस रुपये" and "TWENTY RUPEES".

=== Mintmark ===
The mintmark is featured at the bottom on the obverse of the ₹20 coin.

- ⧫ (small dot/diamond) = Mumbai
- ° (circular dot) = Noida
- ⋆ (star) = Hyderabad
- (no mintmark) = Kolkata
