= Indian 1-paisa coin =

Indian coin

One Paisa
- India
- Value: 1 (1/100₹)
- Mass: 1.48 g (0.048 troy oz)
- Diameter: 16 mm (0.063 in)
- Thickness: 1.01 mm (0.04 in)
- Edge: Smooth
- Composition: Nickel-brass (1964); Aluminium (1965–1971)
- Years of minting: 1957–1981
- Mintage: 2,235,853,025
- Mint marks: Mumbai = ⧫ Mumbai Proof issues = B Hyderabad = * Noida = ° Kolkata = No mint-mark
- Circulation: Demonetized
- Catalog number: KM#9 & KM#10

Obverse

Reverse

The Indian One Paisa coin (Hindi: पैसा) is a former denomination of the Indian Rupee. The 1 coin equals 1/100 (one-hundredth) of the Indian Rupee. The symbol for paisa is. In 1955, India adopted metric system for coinage and amended the "Indian Coinage Act". Subsequently, one paisa coins were introduced on 1 April 1957. From 1957 to 1964, one paisa coin was called "Naya Paisa" (Hindi: नया पैसा) (English: New Paisa) and on 1 June 1964, the term "Naya" was dropped and the denomination was simply called "One paisa". One paisa coin has been demonetized and is no longer legal tender.

== History ==
Prior to 1957, the Indian rupee was not decimalised and the rupee from 1835 to 1957 AD was further divided into 16 annas. Each anna was further divided to four Indian pices and each pice into three pies till 1947 when the pie was demonetized. In 1955, India amended the "Indian Coinage Act" to adopt the metric system for coinage. Paisa coins were introduced in 1957, but from 1957 to 1964 the coin was called "Naya Paisa" (English: New Paisa). On 1 June 1964, the term "Naya" was dropped and the denomination was simply called "One paisa". One paisa coins were issued as a part of "The Decimal Series". One paisa coin was withdrawn from circulation and demonetized on 30 June 2011.

== Variants ==
Variants (1964-1981)
Image		Value	Technical parameters				Description			Year of minting		Monetary status
Obverse	Reverse	Value	Weight	Diameter	Thickness	Metal	Edge	Obverse	Reverse	First	Last	Monetary status
		1 Paisa	1.5 g	16 mm	1 mm	Bronze	Smooth	State Emblem of India & country name in Hindi and English.	Face-value and year.	1957	1961	
		1 Paisa	1.48 g	16 mm	1.01 mm	Nickel-brass	Smooth	State Emblem of India & country name in Hindi and English.	Face-value and year.	1959	1964	Demonetized.
		1 Paisa	0.75 g	17 mm	1.72 mm	Aluminium	Smooth	State Emblem of India & country name in Hindi and English.	Face-value and year.	1965	1981	Demonetized.

== See also ==
- Indian paisa
