= Indian 20-paisa coin =

Former denomination of the Indian rupee

Twenty paise
- India
- Value: 20 (1/5 ₹) Paise
- Mass: 2.2 g
- Diameter: 26 mm (1.02362 in)
- Thickness: 1.7 mm (0.0669291 in)
- Edge: Milled(1968-1971) smooth(1982-1997)
- Shape: round(1968-1971) hexagonal(1982-1997)
- Composition: nickel-brass(1968-1971) aluminum-bronze(1969) aluminum(1982-1997)
- Years of minting: 1968–1971; 1982-1997
- Mint marks: Mumbai = ⧫ Mumbai Proof issues = B Hyderabad = * Noida = ° Kolkata = No mint-mark
- Circulation: In-circulation

Obverse
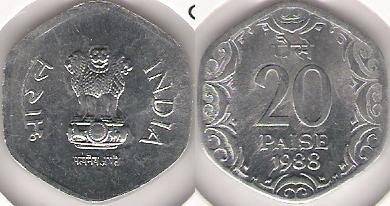
- Design: State Emblem of India with country name.

Reverse
- Design: Face value and year

The Indian 20 coin is a former denomination of the Indian rupee. The 20 Paise coin equals 1/5 of a rupee. Twenty paise coins were issued by the Government of India from 1968 to 1997. Twenty paise coins were declared invalid on 30 June 2011.

== Lotus coins ==
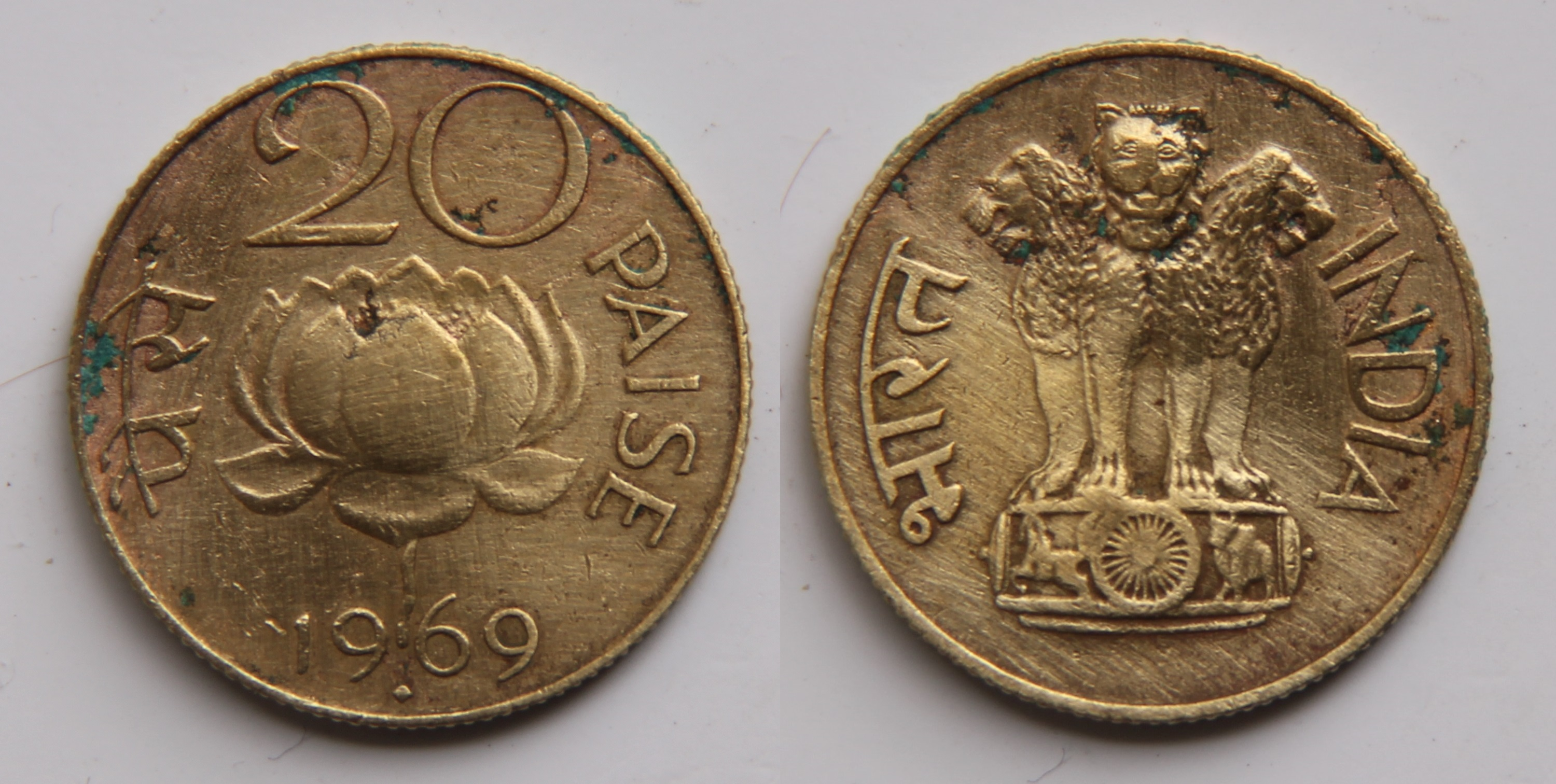
Year 1969 version 20 Paisa Bronze coin

The twenty paisa coins issued from 1968 to 1971 were made of nickel-brass alloy. The obverse of these coins had a lion symbol in the center and the words "India" in English and Hindi on both sides. The reverse of the coin had a blooming lotus in the center. The words "Paisa" in English and Hindi were engraved on the right and left sides of the lotus. Above the lotus was the number 20 and below it was the year of the coin and the mint mark. These coins were also known as lotus coins.

These coins weighed 4.6 grams, were 22 millimeters in diameter, and 1.75 millimeters thick. These coins were round in shape.

== Aluminum coins ==
Twenty paise coins were issued from 1982 to 1997 and were made of aluminium. They weighed 2.2 grams, were 26 millimetres in diameter and 1.7 millimetres thick. They were hexagonal in shape.
