= Indian 25-paisa coin =

Former denomination of the Indian rupee

Twenty-five paise
- India
- Value: 25 (₹ 1/4) Paise
- Mass: 2.83 g
- Diameter: 19.05 mm (0.75 in)
- Thickness: 1.55 mm (0.06102362 in)
- Edge: smooth
- Composition: Nickel (1957-1972) cupronickel (1972-1990); Stainless Steel (1988-2002)
- Years of minting: 1957–2002
- Mint marks: Mumbai = ⧫ Mumbai Proof issues = B Hyderabad = * Noida = ° Kolkata = No mint-mark
- Circulation: Demonetized
- Catalog number: KM#398, KM#374 and KM#70 to KM#55

Obverse
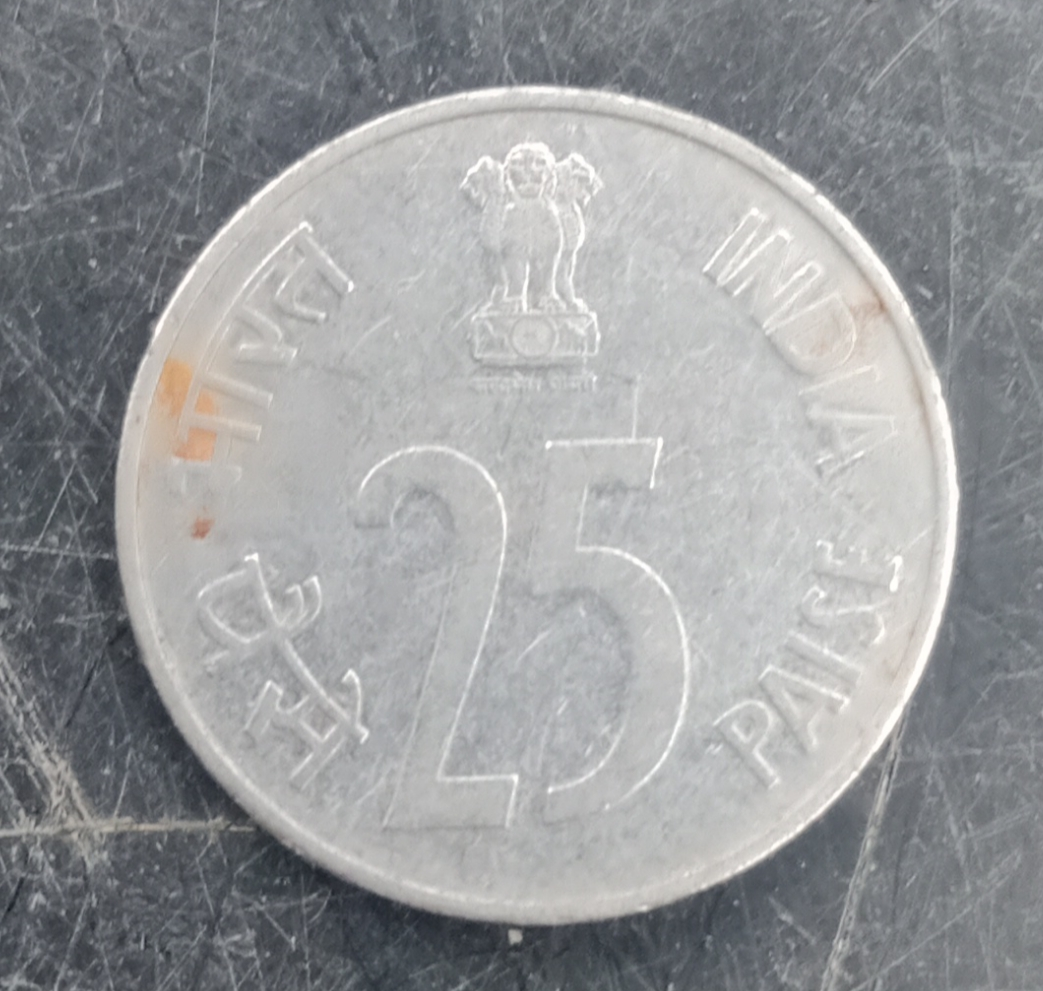
- Design: State Emblem of India with country name and the word 'paise' in English and Hindi.

Reverse
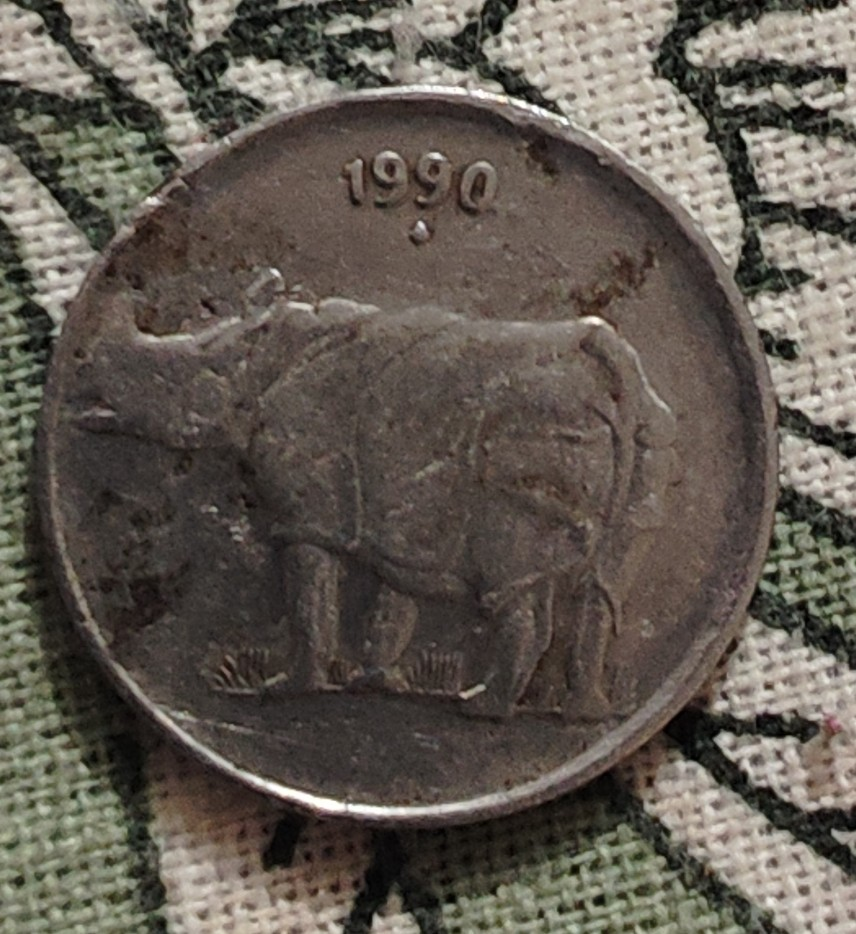
- Design: A rhino with year and mint.

The 25 coin, popularly called Chawanni is a former denomination of the Indian rupee. The 25 paisa coin was worth 1/4 of a rupee (1 rupee = 100 paise).

== Introduction and Demonetization ==
The 25 Paisa coin was introduced in 1957. Prior to this, the 25 paise coin was known as the "1/4 rupee", which was equivalent to 4 annas (1 rupee = 16 annas). On June 30, 2011, the 25 paisa and all lower denomination coins were officially demonetised.

== Features ==
- Ferritic Stainless Steel was used to mint the 25 paisa coin.
- The diameter of the coin is 19 mm.
- Weight of the coin is 2.83 g.
- In 1964-1983 the 25 paisa coin was minted in Copper-Nickel.
