= Indian 5-rupee coin =

Indian coin

Five rupees
- India
- Value: ₹5
- Mass: 6.80 g
- Diameter: 23 mm
- Edge: reeded
- Composition: Nickel-brass
- Years of minting: 1949 – present
- Circulation: Wide

Obverse
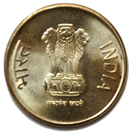
- Design: Lettering of "भारत" on left, "india" on right, Lion capital at centre with the lettering "सत्यमेव जयते" below it.
- Designer: RBI
- Design date: 2011

Reverse
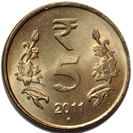
- Designer: RBI
- Design date: 2011

The Indian 5 rupee coin (₹5) is a denomination of the Indian rupee. It has been continuously minted and circulated since 1949, having passed through numerous iterations and designs. The ₹5 coin was the highest denominated coin in the country until the minting of the ₹10 in 2005.

== Design of the coin ==
The Lion Capital of Ashoka is minted on the obverse along with the denomination below. In some ₹5 coins, the denomination alone was minted on the obverse and the Lion Capital minted on the reverse side.

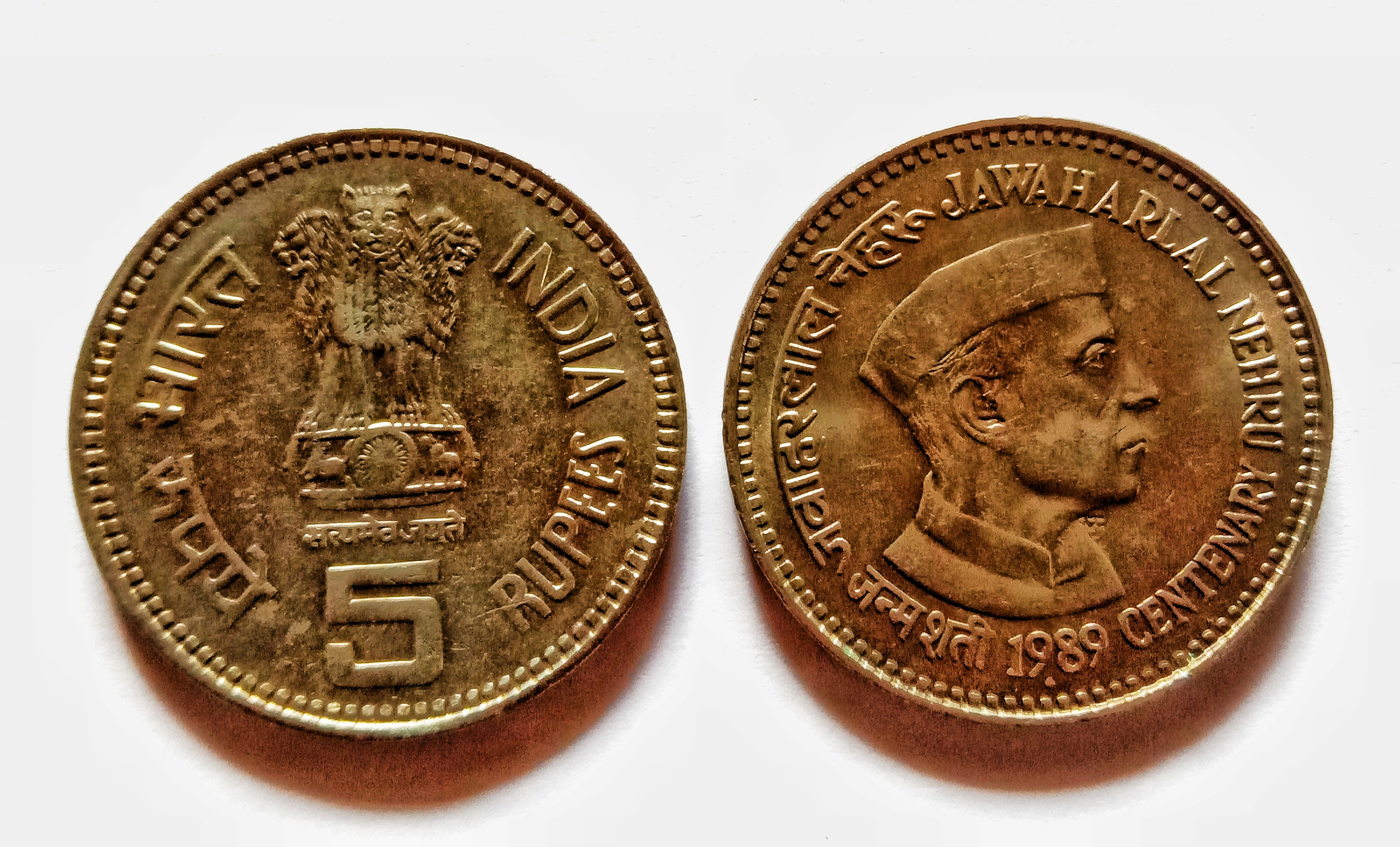
5 Rupees coin commemorating the birth centenary of Jawaharlal Nehru in 1989.

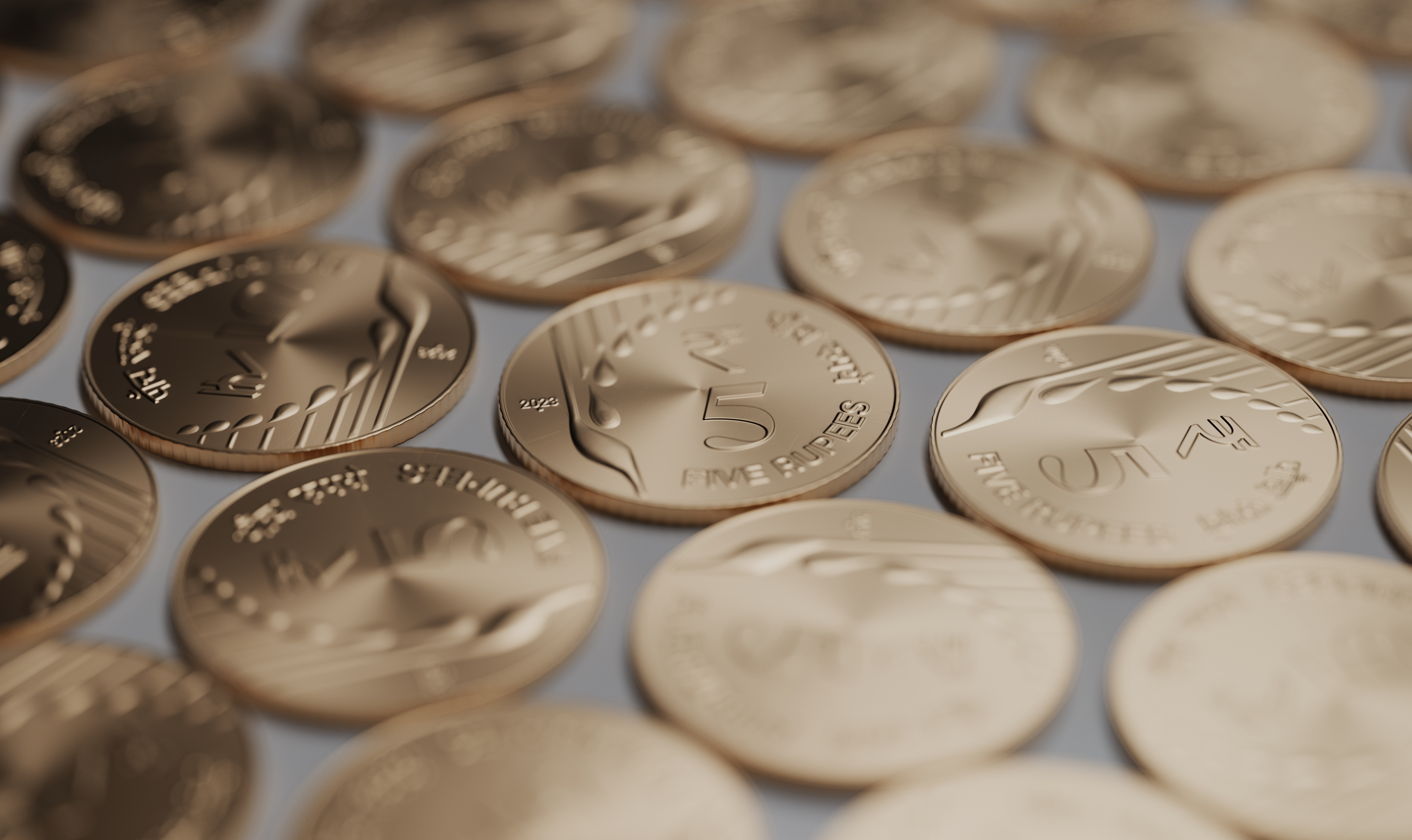
5Coins

The coins also are minted with the face of Indira Gandhi in her assassination and Jawaharlal Nehru during his 100th birthday anniversary.

=== Pre-decimalization ===
The earliest 5 rupee coins, dating back to the 1950s were minted in brass, with the lettering "GCD" on the obverse and a drawing of a building on the reverse. This issue was in limited circulation and is very rarely found today.

=== 1992 design (National Integration) ===
This issue was minted in cupro-nickel, with a diameter of 23mm and weight of 9g. The obverse features the Lion capital of Ashoka with the lettering "सत्यमेव जयते" below as well as the lettering "भारत" on left and "INDIA" on right. The reverse features the denomination and the date (sometimes accompanied by mint marks) flanked by a motif of lotus flowers. Some of these coins were issued by the Moscow Mint.

=== 2005 design (Unity in Diversity) ===
The 2005 coins were minted in stainless steel, with a diameter of 23mm and weight of 6g. The obverse features the Lion capital, denomination, lettering of the country, and the date at the bottom. The reverse features a cross with four dots representing "Unity in Diversity" and the lettering "पाँच रूपये" and "FIVE RUPEES" along the top left.

=== 2008 design (Connectivity & Technology) ===
The 2008 issue is largely similar to its predecessor in composition and design of the obverse. However the reverse features the denomination atop a motif resembling waves.

=== 2011 design (New rupee sign) ===
All issues after 2011 have been minted in nickel-brass. The 2011 issue has a diameter of 23mm and weight of 6g. The obverse features the Lion capital of Ashoka with the lettering "सत्यमेव जयते" below as well as the lettering "भारत" on left and "INDIA" on right. The reverse features the denomination below the ₹ symbol and the date flanked by a motif of lotus flowers.

=== 2019 design (Grain Series) ===
The 2019 issue has a diameter of 25mm and a weight of 6.74g. The obverse is largely the same, but the reverse features the number 10 below the ₹ currency sign, the year of issue and eight stylized grain stalks.

=== 2022 design (75th Year of Independence) ===
The 2022 issue is largely similar to its predecessor in composition and design of the obverse. However the reverse now features the motif of Azadi Ka Amrit Mahotsav (Platinum Jubilee of Independence) at the centre, the lettering "75th Year of Independence" on top, the date and mintmark on the left and the denomination at the bottom.
