= Indian 2-rupee coin =

Indian coin

Two rupees
- India
- Value: ₹2
- Mass: 4.07 g
- Diameter: 23 mm
- Edge: 50 wide serrations
- Composition: Ferritic stainless steel
- Years of minting: 1982 – present
- Circulation: Wide

Obverse
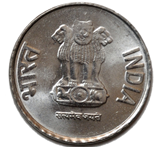
- Design: Lettering of "भारत" on left, "INDIA" on right, Lion capital at centre with the lettering "सत्यमेव जयते" below it.
- Designer: RBI
- Design date: 2011

Reverse
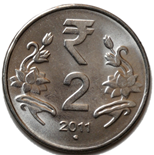
- Designer: RBI
- Design date: 2011

The Indian 2-rupee coin is a denomination of the Indian rupee. The 2 rupee coin was introduced in India in 1982. Until then, the Rs.2 was in circulation in banknotes. The old Rs.2 coin was minted with cupro-nickel metal. The new Rs.2 coin was minted in ferritic stainless steel.

== Old Rs.2 ==
- The old Rs.2 coin was of 26mm diameter.
- The weight of the coin is 6 grams.
- The shape is eleven-sided (hendecagonal) or cornered.

== Rs.2 coin (no rupee sign) ==
- The Rs.2 coin (no rupee sign) is of 27mm diameter.
- The weight of the coin is 5.62 grams.
- The shape is circular.

== Rs.2 coin (new rupee sign) ==
- The Rs.2 coin (new rupee sign) is of 25mm diameter.
- The weight of the coin is 4.5 grams.
- The shape is circular.

== See also ==
- Indian 2-rupee note
