= Coin orientation =

Relative orientation of two sides of a coin or medal

Coin orientation (or coin alignment or variations of these) is the relation of the vertical orientation of the images on the obverse and reverse sides of coins to one another. The two basic relations are called medallic orientation and coin orientation. Other orientations can occur in error coins when the images on the obverse or reverse dies are rotated from their intended orientations.

== Medallic orientation ==
Medallic orientation (or medal alignment, or variations of these) derives its name from medals tagged to a uniform. For a medal to display properly, when the obverse of the medal is right side up, a left or right turn must show the reverse also to be right side up. Thus, the tops of the obverse and reverse share the same position. In Britain, this is sometimes called "British turnover". British coinage, most other Commonwealth coinage, Japanese yen coinage, and Euro coinage have medallic orientation.

== Coin orientation ==
Coin alignment or coin orientation is present when the tops of the designs are aligned opposite of each other. The concept originated as a western style that was adopted by countries like Japan in the late 19th century. United States coins are among those with coin orientation.
