= Indian Coinage Act, 1906 =

Act of Imperial Legislative Council of India

Imperial Legislative Council
- Long title: An Act to consolidate and amend the law relating to Coinage and the Mint.
- Citation: Act No. 3 of 1906
- Territorial extent: India
- Enacted by: Imperial Legislative Council
- Enacted: 2 March 1906

Repeals
- Indian Coinage Act 1870; Indian Coinage and Paper Currency Act, 1899

Amended by
- List: Repealing and Amending Act, 1914; Indian Coinage (Amendment) Act, 1918; Indian Coinage (Amendment) Act, 1919; Indian Coinage (Amendment) Act, 1920; Indian Coinage (Amendment) Act, 1924; Indian Coinage (Amendment) Act, 1940; Indian Coinage (Amendment) Act, 1947; Indian Coinage (Amendment) Act 1955; Indian Coinage (Amendment) Act, 1964; Indian Coinage (Amendment) Act, 1968; Indian Coinage (Amendment) Act 1975; Coinage (Amendment) Act, 1985

Repealed by
- Coinage Act, 2011
- Status: Repealed

The Indian Coinage Act, 1906, is a law that authorises the India Government Mints to strike all legal coinage in India. Newly minted coins are placed into circulation by the Reserve Bank of India. At the time the Act was enacted during the British Raj, the Act mandated standards for the fineness of silver coins, but subsequent amendments lowered the silver content required for the coins.
