= India Government Mint, Noida =

Mint established in 1988

- Formation: 1 July 1988; 38 years ago
- Founder: Indian Finance ministry
- Founded at: Noida, Uttar Pradesh, India
- Type: Public sector undertaking
- Legal status: Mint
- Purpose: To mint coins for India and other countries.
- Headquarters: Janpath, Delhi, India
- Location: Sector-1, Noida, Uttar Pradesh
- Coordinates: 28°35′30.4656″N 77°18′46.3752″E
- Parent organization: SPMCIL
- Subsidiaries: None
- Website: igmnoida.spmcil.com/Interface/Home.aspx

The India Government Mint, Noida, is one of the four mints in India; based in Noida, in the state of Uttar Pradesh, the mint started production on 1 July 1988 and is the only India Government Mint established since India became an independent country in 1947. It produced the first stainless steel coins in India and aside from producing coins for its home country, it also produces coins for other countries.

== History ==
In 1984, the Government of India established a new mint in the city of Noida, Uttar Pradesh. With an estimated annual production capacity of 2,000 million coins, the new mint was established to cater to the increasing demand for coins in India. In January 1986 the project was started by the Department of Economic Affairs under the Ministry of Finance with a budget of ₹30 crore (equivalent to ₹446 crore or US$46 million in 2026). The mint was completed on time and began production on 1 July 1988. It produced the first stainless steel coins for India.

== Organisation ==
Since 13 January 2006, the India Government Mint at Noida has been a part of Security Printing & Minting Corporation of India Limited. It is headed by a board of directors.

== Mint mark ==
Coins minted at the India Government Mint, Noida carries its mint mark of a small or large dot (° or o).

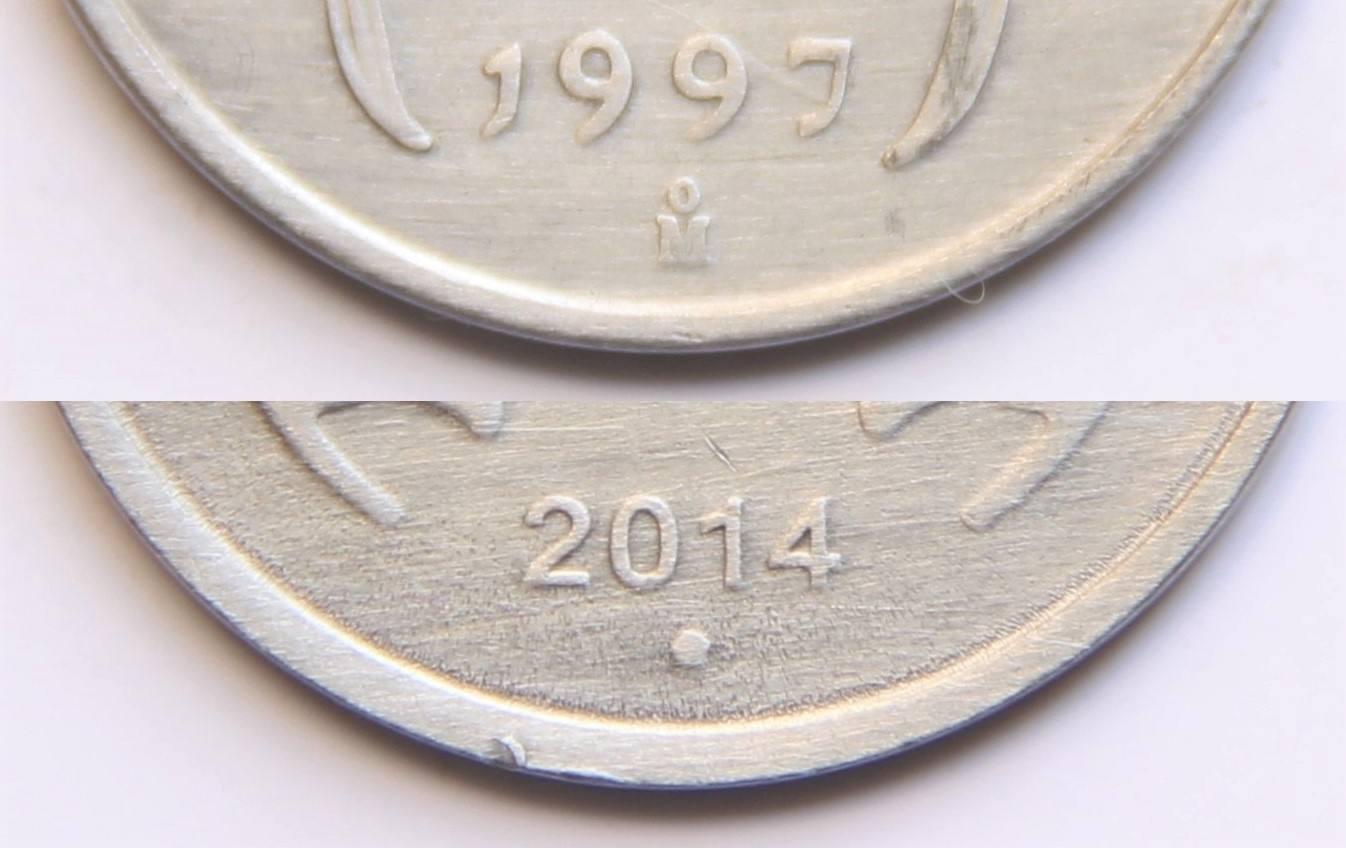
Noida Mint marks on rupee coins (The image at the top bears a mintmark of Mexico city, not Noida)

== Production ==
Aside from producing coins for India, the mint has also produced coins for Thailand and Dominican Republic. From April 2012, the mint introduced night-shift production. Before the November 2016 demonetization of INR500 and INR1000 banknotes, the mint produced nearly 40% of the total coins and had an annual target of producing coins worth ₹400 crore (US$42 million). This production was later increased due to shortage of liquid currency.
