= Indian 1-rupee coin =

Denomination of the Indian rupee

One rupee coin
- India
- Value: ₹1
- Mass: 3.09 g
- Diameter: 20 mm (0.79 in)
- Composition: Stainless steel
- Years of minting: 1950–present
- Mint marks: ⧫ = Mumbai; B = Mumbai Proof issue * = Hyderabad ° = Noida; No mint-mark = Kolkata

Obverse
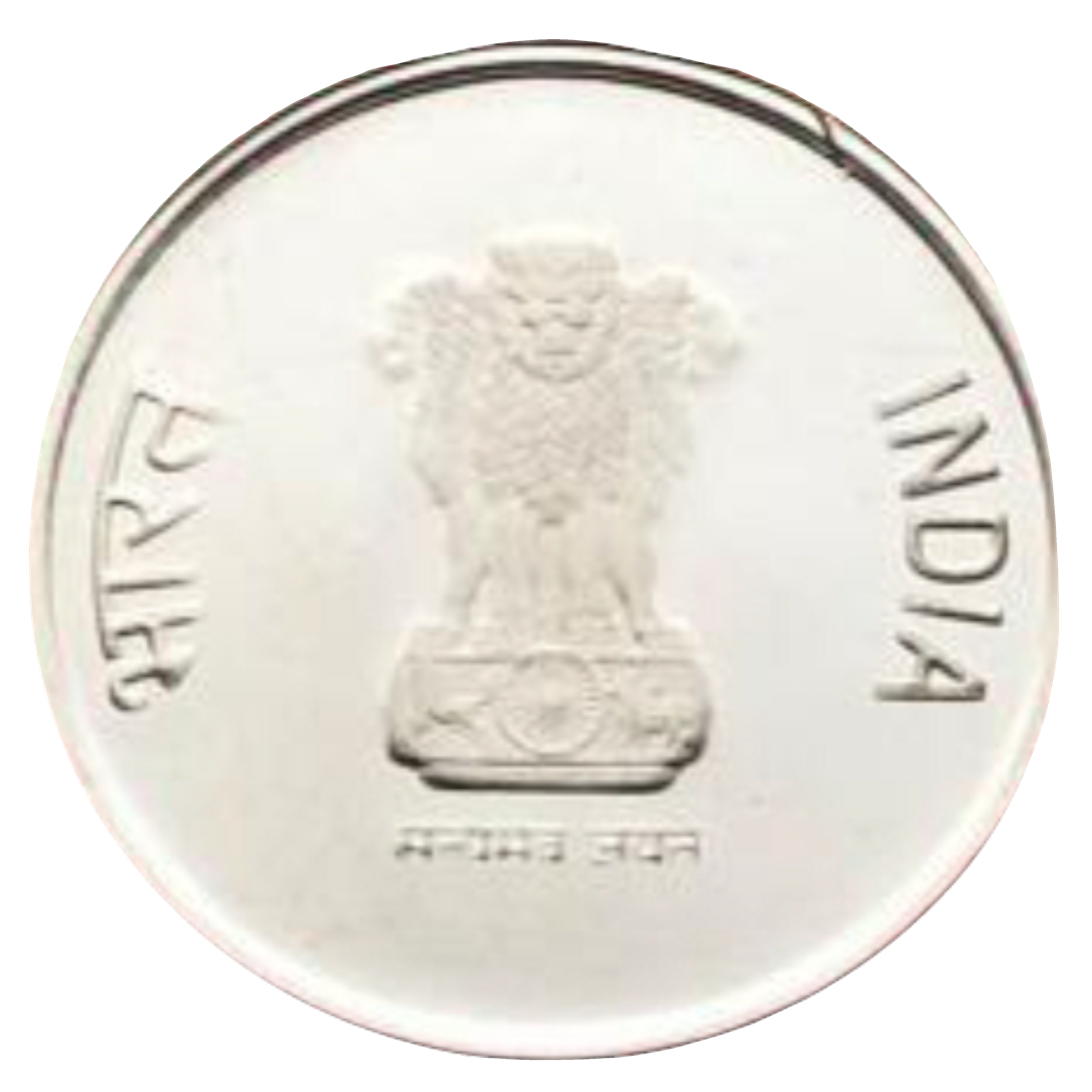
- Designer: Reserve Bank of India
- Design date: 2019
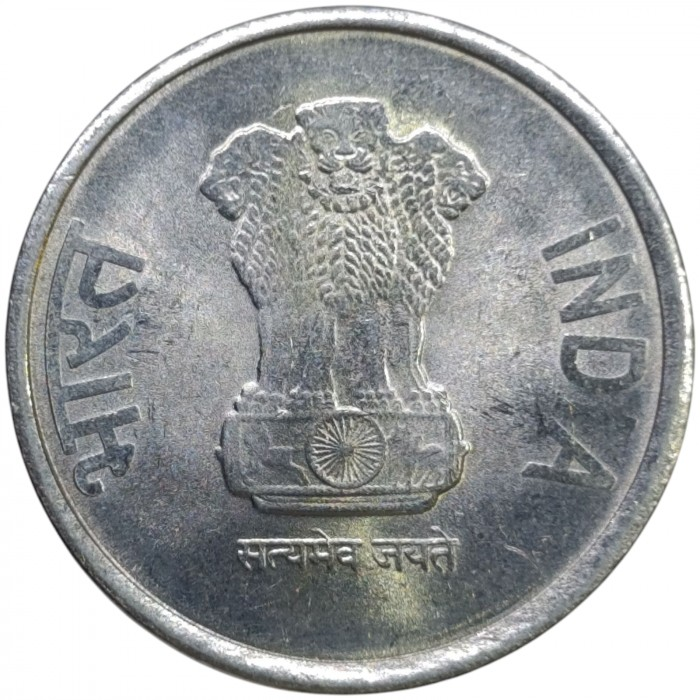
- Designer: Reserve Bank of India
- Design date: 2011
- Design discontinued: 2019
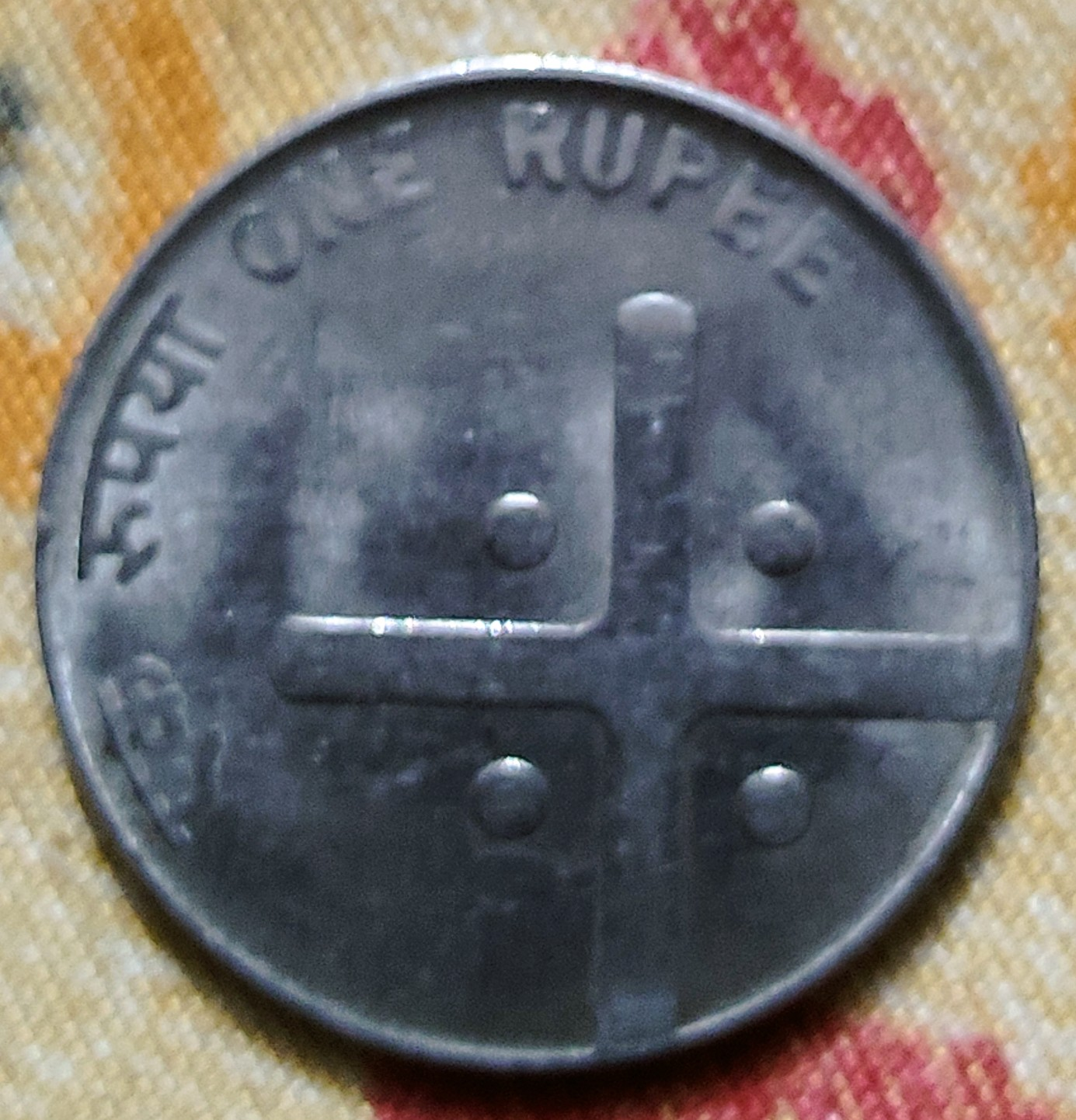
- Designer: National Institute of Design
- Design date: 2005
- Design discontinued: 2007

Reverse
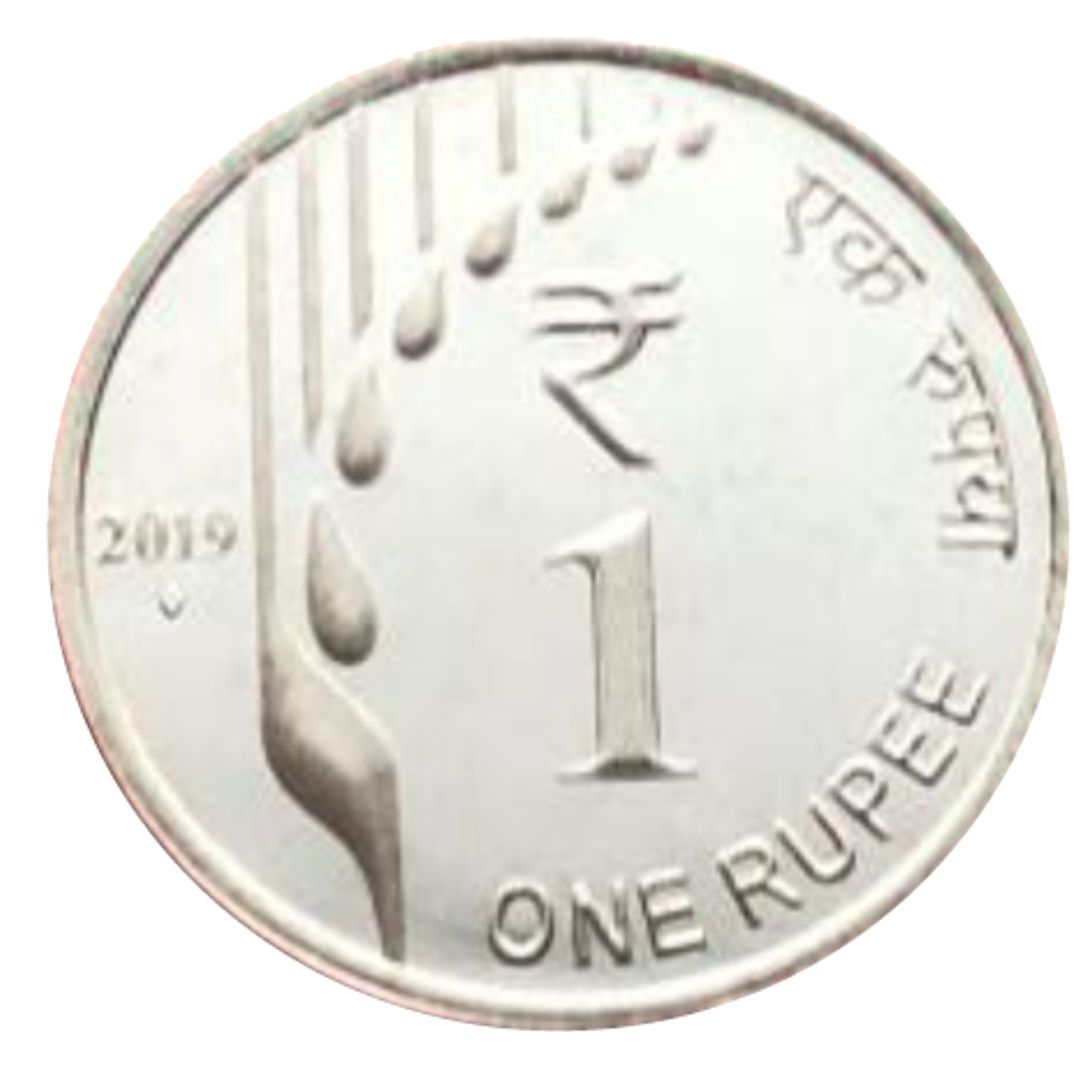
- Designer: Reserve Bank of India
- Design date: 2019
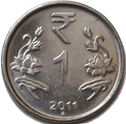
- Designer: Reserve Bank of India
- Design date: 2011
- Design discontinued: 2019
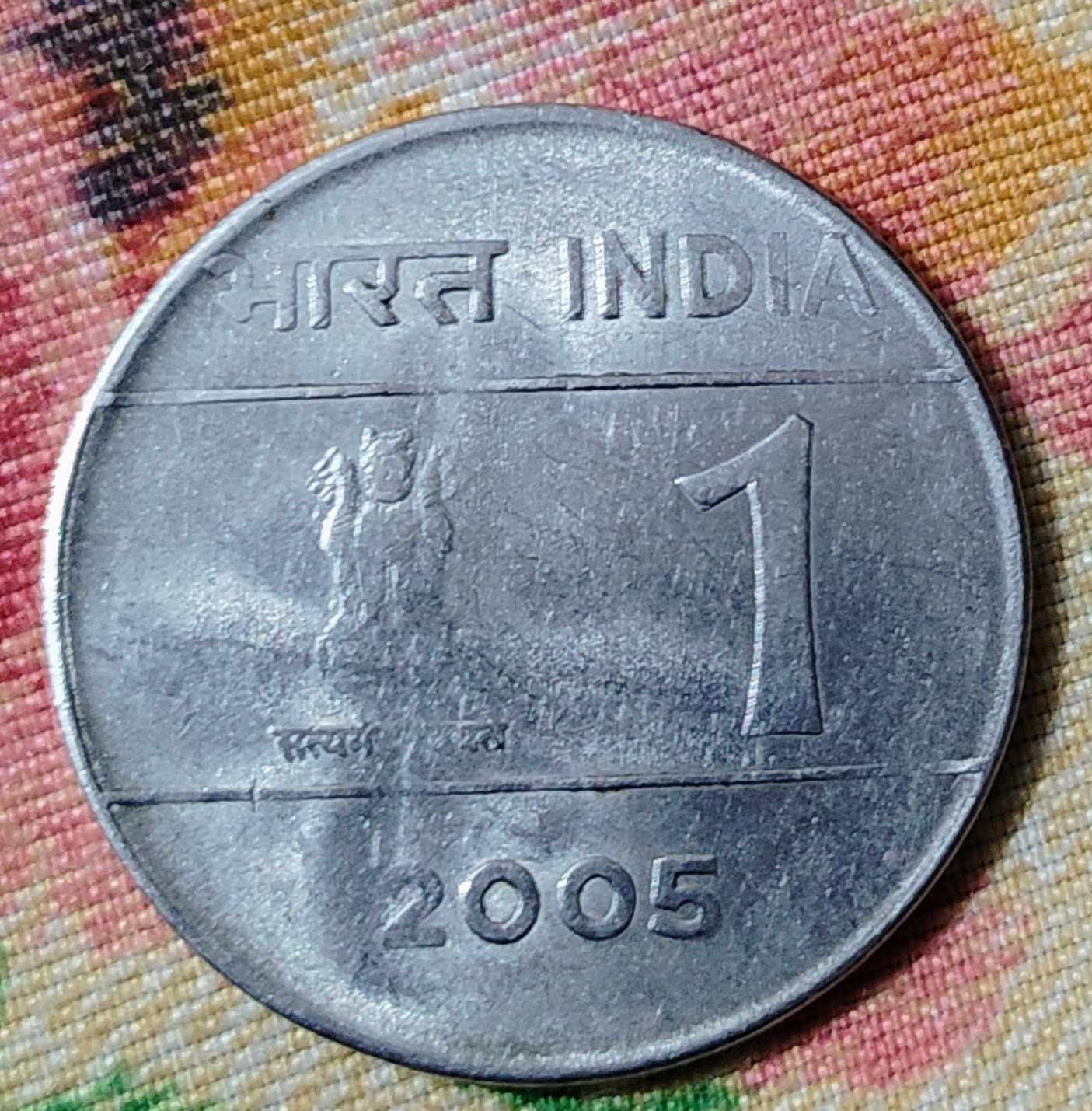
- Designer: National Institute of Design
- Design date: 2005
- Design discontinued: 2007

The Indian 1-rupee coin (₹1) is an Indian coin worth one Indian rupee and is made up of a hundred paisas. Currently, one rupee coin is the smallest Indian coin in circulation. Since 1992, one Indian rupee coins are minted from stainless steel. Round in shape, the one rupee coins weighs 3.76 grams (58.0 grains), has a diameter of 21.93-millimetre (0.863 in) and thickness of 1.45-millimetre (0.057 in). In independent India, one rupee coins were first minted in 1950 and are currently in circulation.

== History ==
=== Sur Empire ===
Sher Shah Suri, the founder of the Sur Empire ruled North India from 1540 to 1545 AD. During his reign, Suri issued pure silver coins in 1542 and named it Rupiya (from Sanskrit रौप्य, raupya, meaning silver). The denomination remained in usage through the Mughal, Maratha, East India company and British rules. The rupiya was retained by the East India company till 1835 and formed the basis of the British Raj currency till 1947. Each rupiya coin weighed 178 grains (11.5 grams). The sub-unit of rupyia were copper pieces and 40 copper pieces constituted as one rupiya. Sher Shah Suri named the copper pieces as Paisa.

1 Rupiya coin (Sher Shah Suri)
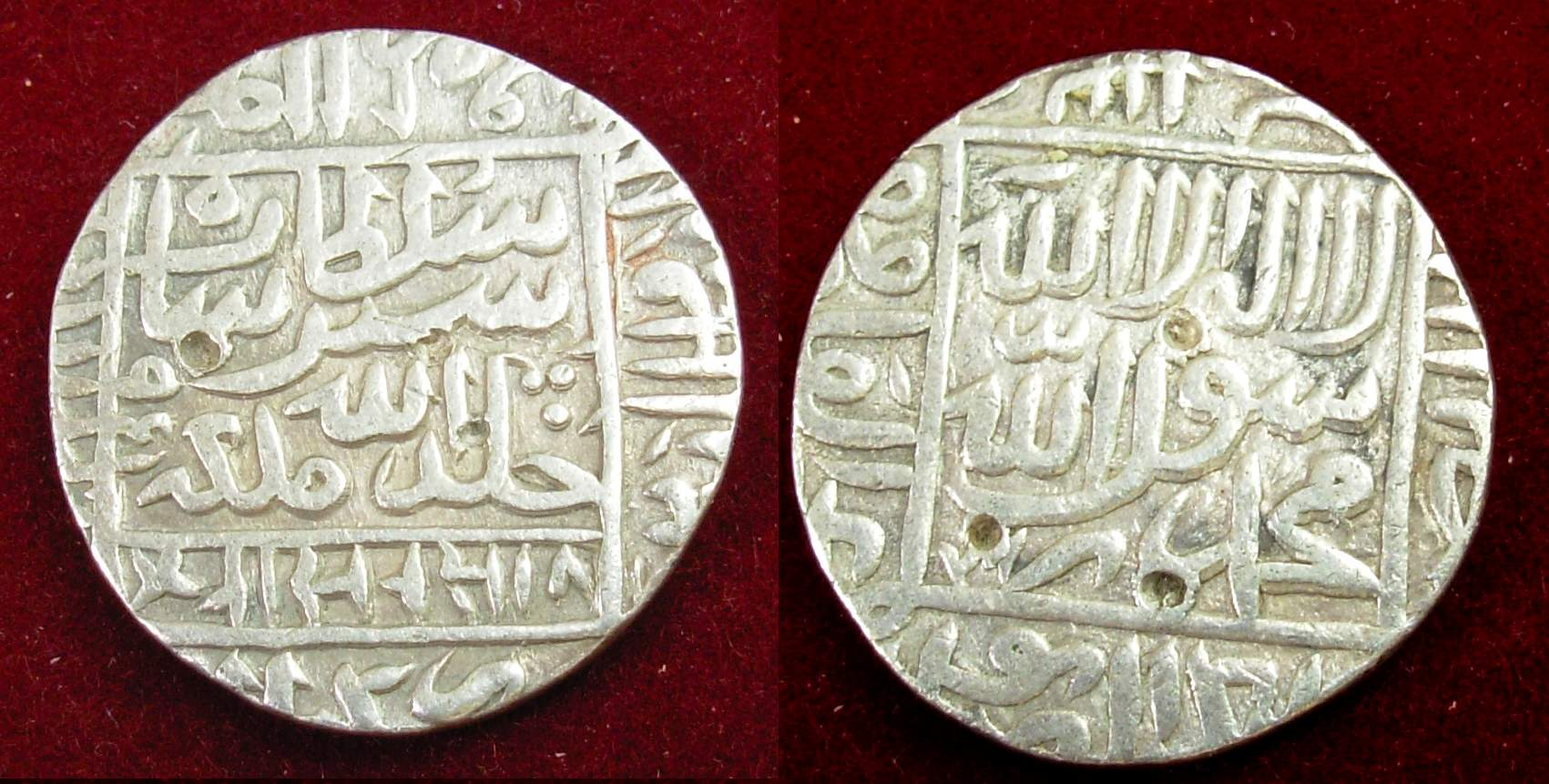
First side of the image: Obverse: Trace of Kalima, name of four Khalifas, Sher Shah Suri's name and pious wish "Khald Allah mulk".
Second side of the image: Reverse: Name of mint (some coins bore word "Jahapanah" instead of mint name) and date.
Coins were minted in different mints like Ujjain, Agra, Punduah, Chunar, Satgaon etc.

=== Danish, Dutch, French and Portuguese India ===
Each minted their own coinage, with Danish India using Fano; French India: Roupie and fanon till 1954; Portuguese India rupia till 1958, ...

=== British East India company ===
In 1717 AD, the East India Company obtained permission from the Mughal emperor Farrukhsiyar to coin Mughal style currency, at their Bombay factory. In 1835 AD, the Coinage Act of 1835 for uniform coinage came into force. Composed of 91.7% silver, the new one rupee coins weighed 11.66 grams (179.9 grains) and had a diameter of 30.55 millimetres (1.203 in). The reverse of all one rupee coins minted after 1835 and before 1862 AD bore "East India Company" instead of the Mughal Empire. The one rupee coins had bust of King William IIII (IV minted as IIII) and were first minted in 1835 AD. Rupee coins issued after 1840 bore the busts of Queen Victoria (1840 to 1901 AD).

The East India Company wanted to introduce the Pound sterling in India, due to the popularity of the Rupiya, the Pound sterling could not be introduced in India.

==== Madras Presidency ====
The Madras Presidency issued one rupee coins until 1815 AD. One rupee was equal to twelve fanams.

1 Rupee coin (Madras Presidency)
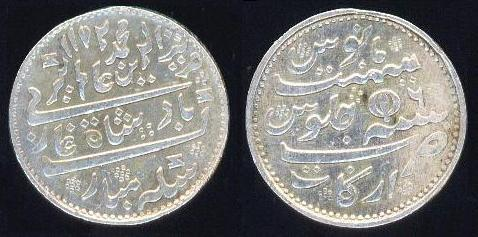
First side of the image: Obverse:
Second side of the image: Reverse:

=== British Raj (1858-1947) ===
The British Raj started in India in 1858 AD and lasted until Indian independence in 1947. In 1862, new one rupee coins were issued, were known as the Regal issue, bore the bust of Queen Victoria on the obverse and "India" minted on the reverse side. From 1862 to 1939 AD, one rupee coins were minted from 91.7% silver, weighed 11.66 grams (179.9 grains), had a diameter of 30.78 millimetres (1.212 in) and thickness of 1.9 millimetres (0.075 in). The obverse side of the coins featured the busts of Queen Victoria (1862 to 1901 AD), Edward VII (1903 to 1910 AD), George V (1911 to 1936 AD) and George VI (1938 to 1947 AD). Edward VIII was never featured on any one rupee coin since his reign (Jan-Dec 1936 AD) was short.

Due to World War I and II, there was a shortage of silver. As a result of the shortage, 0.917 silver one rupee coins were replaced by Quaternary silver alloy (0.500) in 1940. In 1947, the silver one rupee coin was replaced by nickel coins.

=== Princely States ===
Several Princely States issued their own currency, on the demise of the Mughal empire, with Hyderabad state issuing its own Hyderabadi rupee, between 1918 and 1959. As did: Alwar, Ambliara, Awadh, Bahawalpur, Bharatpur, Bikanir, Bund, Chuda, Dhar, Indergadh, Jaisalmer, Jaora, Junagadh, Kalat, Kutch, Mangrol, Mengani, Muli, Mysore, Nawanagar, Palitana, Rajkot, Ramgarh, Sailana, Sayala and several others.

=== One rupee coinage from 1835 to 1947 ===
One Rupee coins (1835 to 1947): East India Company and British Raj
Image		Technical parameters				Description			Year of minting		Known mintage	Comments
Obverse	Reverse	Weight	Diameter	Thickness	Metal	Edge	Obverse	Reverse	First	Last	Known mintage	
		11.66 g	30.5 mm	1.9 mm	Silver (0.917)	Reeded	Bust of King William IIII with his name.	Face value, country and date surrounded by wreath.	1835	1840	69,472,000	
		11.66 g	30.78 mm	1.9 mm	Silver (0.917)	Reeded	Bust of Queen Victoria surrounded by her name.	Face value, country and date surrounded by wreath.	1840	1901	2,454,825,107	
		11.66 g	30.6 mm	1.9 mm	Silver (0.917)	Reeded	Bust of Edward VII surrounded by his name.	Face value, country and date surrounded by wreath.	1903	1910	849,622,000	
		11.66 g	30.5 mm	1.9 mm	Silver (0.917)	Reeded	Bust of George V surrounded by his name.	Face value, country and date surrounded by wreath.	1911	1936	1,807,479,000	Coins minted in 1911 had nick name "pig rupee".
		11.66 g	30.5 mm	1.9 mm	Silver (0.917)	Reeded	Bust of George VI surrounded by his name.	Face value, country and date surrounded by wreath.	1938	1939	772,980,000	
		11.66 g	30.5 mm	1.9 mm	Silver (0.500)	Security	Bust of George VI surrounded by his name.	Face value, country and date surrounded by wreath.	1939	1945	772,980,000	
		11.8 g	28 mm	2.48 mm	Nickel	Security	Bust of George VI surrounded by his name.	Face value, country and date surrounded by wreath.	1947	1947	160,039,000	Only minted in 1947.

=== Independent India ===
On 15 August 1947, India obtained independence and the monetary system and coinage of the British Raj were retained. It was not until 15 August 1950 that India introduced new coins. Introduction of new coins (including one rupee coin) was done in following chronology and reasons;

- Motifs and symbol of sovereignty were adapted to represent Indian independence.
- Introduction of metric system and related impact on Indian coinage.
- Changes due to metallic value of coins.
- "Coinisation" of currency notes for cost-benefit.

== Subunits ==
From 1947 to 1957, the Indian rupee was not decimalised and was divided into 16 annas. Each anna was further divided to four Indian pices (from 1835 to 1947, each pice was divided into three Indian pies; till the pie was demonetized in 1947). Table below shows sub-units of one rupee (1835–present).

Denomination	Sub-unit	Sub-unit	Sub-unit	From	To	Comments
Rupee	Anna (1 Rupee=16 Anna)	Pice (1 Anna = 4 Pice)	Pie (1 Pice = 3 Pie)	1835	1947	Pie demonetized in 1947.
Rupee	Anna (1 Rupee=16 Anna)	Pice (1 Anna = 4 Pice)	-	1947	1950	The Frozen Series
Rupee	Anna (1 Rupee=16 Anna)	Pice (1 Anna = 4 Pice)	-	1950	1957	The Anna Series
Rupee	Paisa (1 Rupee = 100 Paisa)	-	-	1957	1964	Naya Paisa Series. Anna & Pice demonetized in 1957.
Rupee	Paisa (1 Rupee = 100 Paisa)	-	-	1964	Present	Except 50 paisa, all lower coins demonetized.
(1835–1947): 1 Indian rupee = 16 anna = 64 pice = 192 pie. (1947–1957): 1 Indian rupee = 16 anna = 64 pice. (1957–1964): 1 Indian rupee = 100 naye paise. (1964–present): 1 Indian rupee = 100 paise.

== Mintage ==
=== Mintage ===
As of 2020, one rupee coins are minted by the India Government Mints in Mumbai, Kolkata, Hyderabad and in Noida. All coins are circulated only through the Reserve Bank of India.

=== Mint marks ===
The following mint marks have been used on one rupee coins since 1947.

Mint	Mark	Description	Comments
Coins minted in Indian mints
Hyderabad	☆	Five-pointed star	
Kolkata		No mint-mark	Since this was the first Indian mint, coins minted in Kolkata don't carry a mark.
Mumbai	⧫	Diamond	
Mumbai	•	Small dot (solid)	
Mumbai	B	Letter B below year	
Mumbai	M	Letter M below year	On coins minted after 1996.
Noida	°	Small dot (hollow)	
Coins minted in foreign mints
Birmingham	H	Letter H below year	One rupee coins (KM# 79.1) in 1985 were also minted in Birmingham mint, United Kingdom.
Kremnica	mk	Letters "mk" in circle	One rupee coins (KM# 92.2) from 1998 to 2001 were also minted in the Kremnica mint, Slovakia.
Mexico	Mo	°M, letter "M" beneath circle	One rupee coins (KM# 92.2) in 1997 were also minted in the Mexican Mint.
Pretoria	M	Letter "M" in oval	One rupee coins (KM# 92.2) from 1998 to 2000 were also minted in the Pretoria mint, South Africa.
Royal Mint	•	Small dot	One rupee coins (KM# 79.1) in 1985 were also minted in Royal Mint in Llantrisant, United Kingdom.

== See also ==
- Indian 2-rupee note
- Indian 1-rupee note
