= 1 naya paisa =

Indian currency (1957–1963)

One Naya Paisa एक नया पैसा
- India
- Value: 1/100 Indian rupee
- Mass: 1.5 g (0.048 troy oz)
- Diameter: 16 mm (0.063 in)
- Thickness: 1.0 mm (0.04 in)
- Edge: Smooth
- Composition: Bronze (1957–1962); Nickel-brass (1962–1963)
- Years of minting: 1957–1963
- Mintage: 2,947,906,000
- Mint marks: Mumbai = ⧫ Mumbai Proof issues = B Hyderabad = * Noida = ° Kolkata = No mint-mark
- Circulation: Demonetized
- Catalog number: KM#8 & KM#8a

Obverse

Reverse

The Indian One Naya paisa (Hindi: एक नया पैसा) was a unit of currency equaling 1/100 (one-hundredth) of the Indian rupee. The symbol for paisa is p. In 1955, India adopted metric system for coinage and amended the "Indian Coinage Act". Subsequently, one paisa coins were introduced on 1 April 1957. From 1957 to 1964, one paisa coin was called "Naya Paisa" (Hindi: नया पैसा) (English: New Paisa) and on 1 June 1964, the term "Naya" was dropped and the denomination was simply called "One paisa". Naya paisa coin has been demonetized and is no longer a Legal tender.

== History ==
Prior to 1957, the Indian rupee was not decimalised and the rupee from 1835 to 1957 AD was further divided into 16 annas. Each anna was further divided into four Indian paisas and each paisa into two pies till 1947 when the pie was demonetized. In 1955, India amended the "Indian Coinage Act" to adopt the metric system for coinage. Paisa coins were introduced in 1957, but from 1957 to 1964 the coin was called "Naya Paisa" (English: New Paisa). On 1 June 1964, the term "Naya" was dropped and the denomination was simply called "One paisa". Naya paisa coins were issued as a part of "The Decimal Series". Naya paisa coin was withdrawn from circulation and demonetized on 30 June 2011.

== Variants ==
Variants (1957-1963).
Image		Value	Technical parameters				Description			Year of minting		Monetary status
Obverse	Reverse	Value	Weight	Diameter	Thickness	Metal	Edge	Obverse	Reverse	First	Last	Monetary status
		1 Naya; Paisa	1.5 g	16 mm	1.0 mm	Bronze	Plain	State Emblem of India & country name in Hindi and English.	Face-value and year.	1957	1962	Demonetized.
		1 Naya; Paisa	1.51 g	16 mm	1.1 mm	Nickel-brass	Smooth	State Emblem of India & country name in Hindi and English.	Face-value and year.	1962	1963	Demonetized.

== See also ==
- Indian paisa
