= Coins of British India =

Coinage used in British-ruled India

Indian rupee coin (1862)
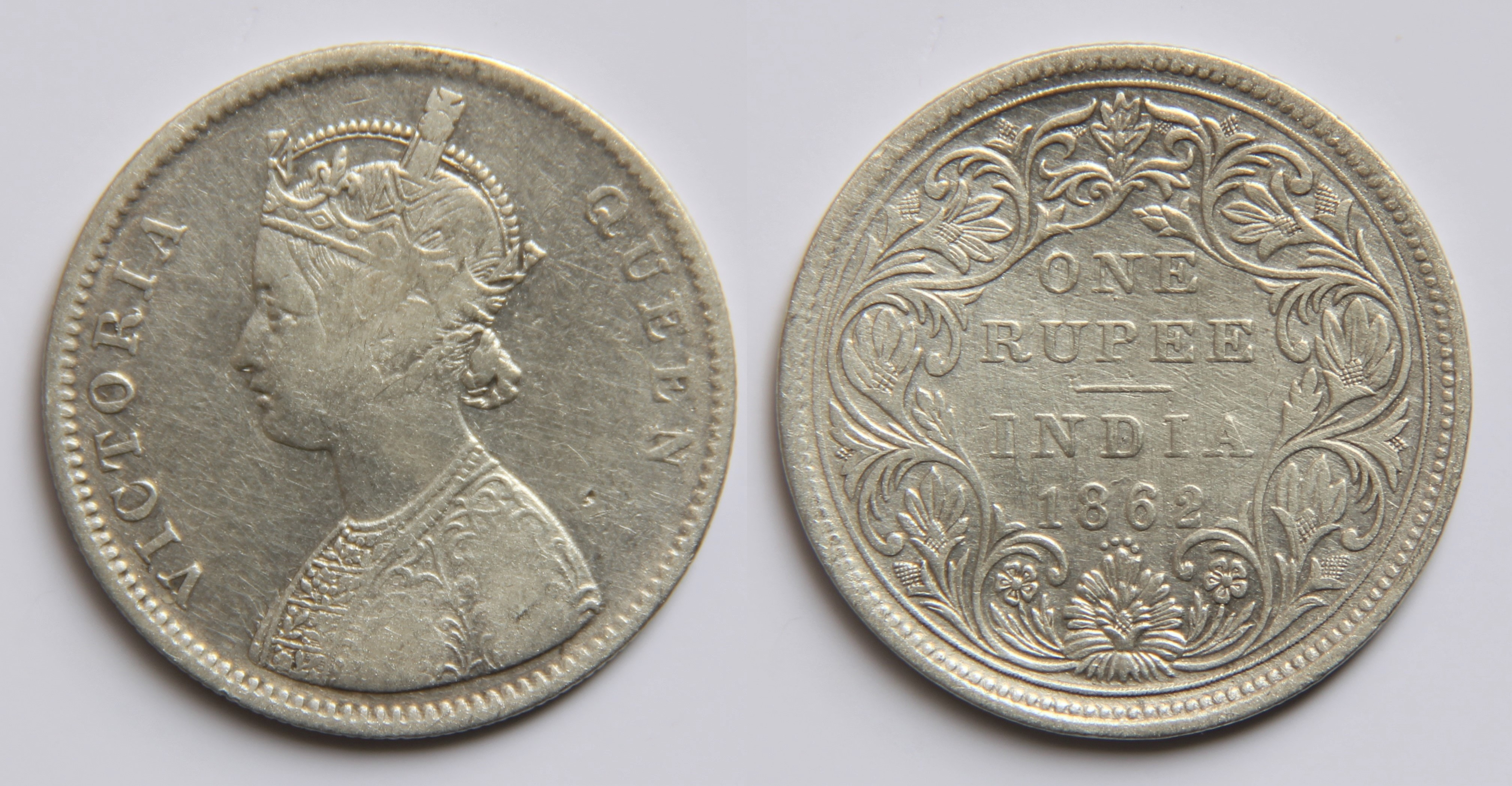
First side of the image: Obverse: Crowned bust surrounded by inscription Victoria Queen
Second side of the image: Reverse: Face value, country and date surrounded by wreath
Coin minted in 1862 and made of 91.7% silver
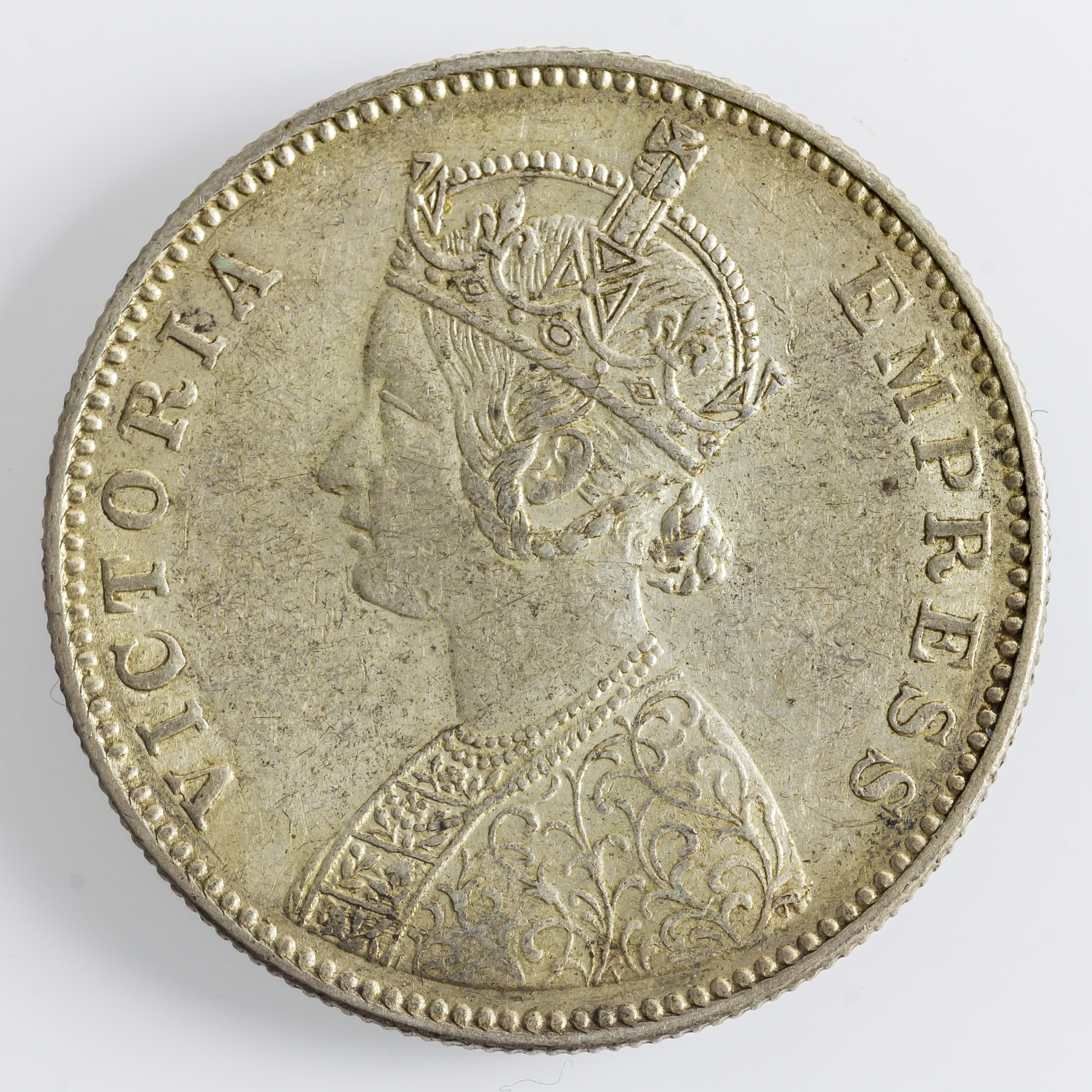
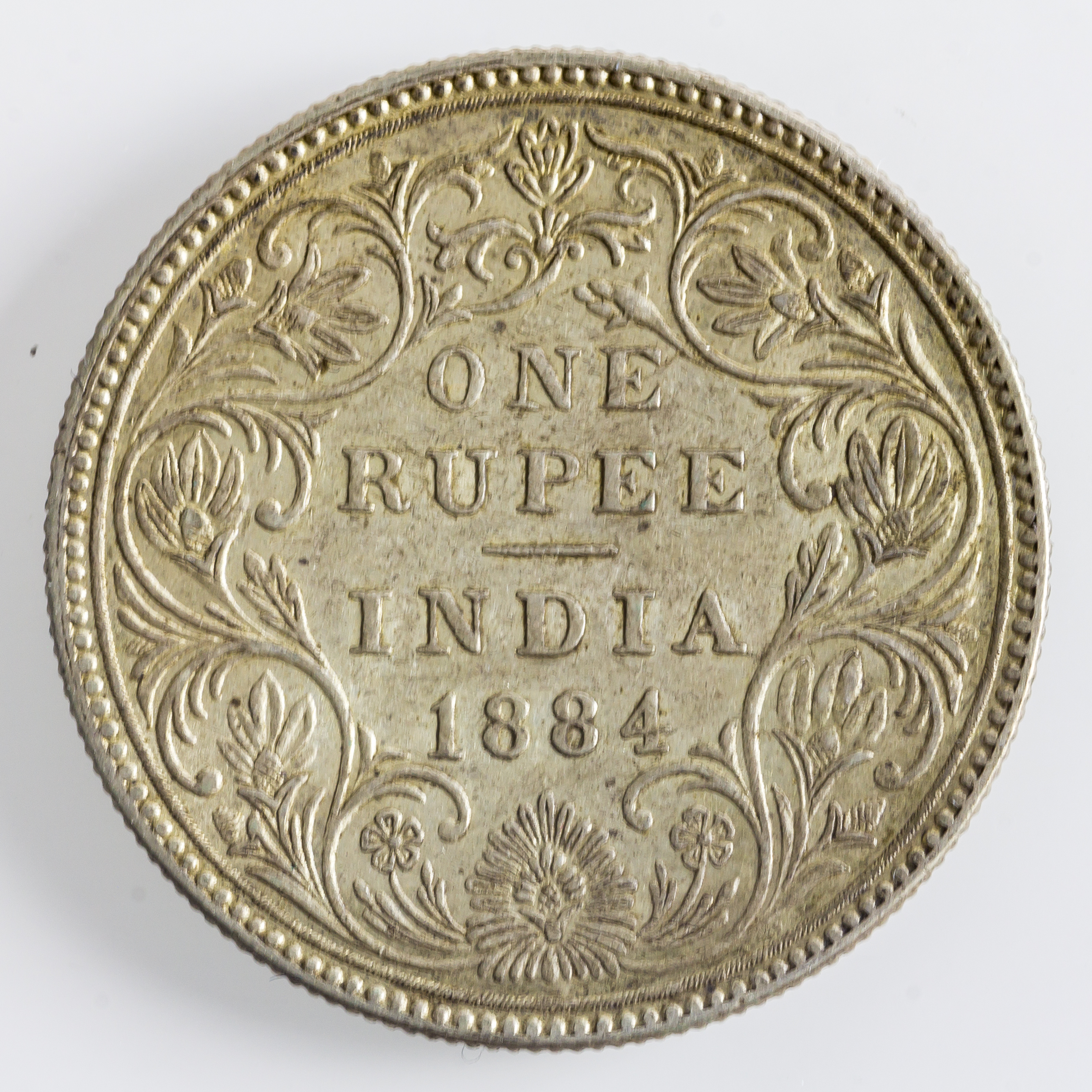
Royal title changed to Victoria Empress in 1877 (1884 coin shown here)

Coinage under British governance of the Indian subcontinent can be divided into two periods: East India Company (EIC) issues, pre-1858; and Imperial issues struck during the British Raj under the direct authority of the crown. The EIC issues can be further subdivided into two subcategories: the Presidency issues, which comprise separate Madras Presidency, Bombay Presidency, and Bengal Presidency issues; and uniform coinage for all British territories from 1835 to 1858. Imperial issues bear obverse portraits of Queen Victoria (dated 1862–1901), Edward VII (dated 1903–1910), George V (dated 1911–1936), and George VI (dated 1938–1947)

British trading posts in the Indian subcontinent were first established by the East India Company (EIC) early in the seventeenth century, which quickly evolved into larger colonies covering a significant part of the subcontinent. Early settlements or factories included Masulipatnam (1611) and Madras (1640) in the south, Surat (1612) in the west, and modern-day Kolkata (1698–99) in the east. These colonies gave rise to Madras Presidency, Bombay Presidency, and Bengal Presidency, and each Presidency had a separate coinage and monetary system. In time, the EIC adopted a unified system of coinage throughout the British possessions in India and the older Presidency system was discontinued. After the Indian Rebellion of 1857, control of EIC territories passed to the British Crown. Coinage issued after 1857 were under the authority of the monarch as India became part of the British Empire. With the Royal Titles Act 1876, Victoria took the title "Empress of India", so in 1877 coin inscriptions changed from Victoria Queen to Victoria Empress.

To minimise circulation of silver coinage and to discourage counterfeiting, all Victoria 1 rupee and half-rupee issues were demonetised from 1 April 1941, followed by Edward VII issues from 31 May 1942. Standard silver George V and VI issues were likewise demonetised from 1 May 1943. All rupee denominations in standard silver were demonetised from 7 June 1947.

There was a transition period after India gained independence on 15 August 1947, and the first set of republic India coins were issued in 1950. British India pice and anna issues remained legal tender until their demonetisation from 1960 through 1968; quarternary alloy George VI rupee denominations and cupro-nickel scalloped four-anna coins were demonetised from 1 April 1968. The final British-period coins were demonetised on 31 December 1984.

== East India Company ==
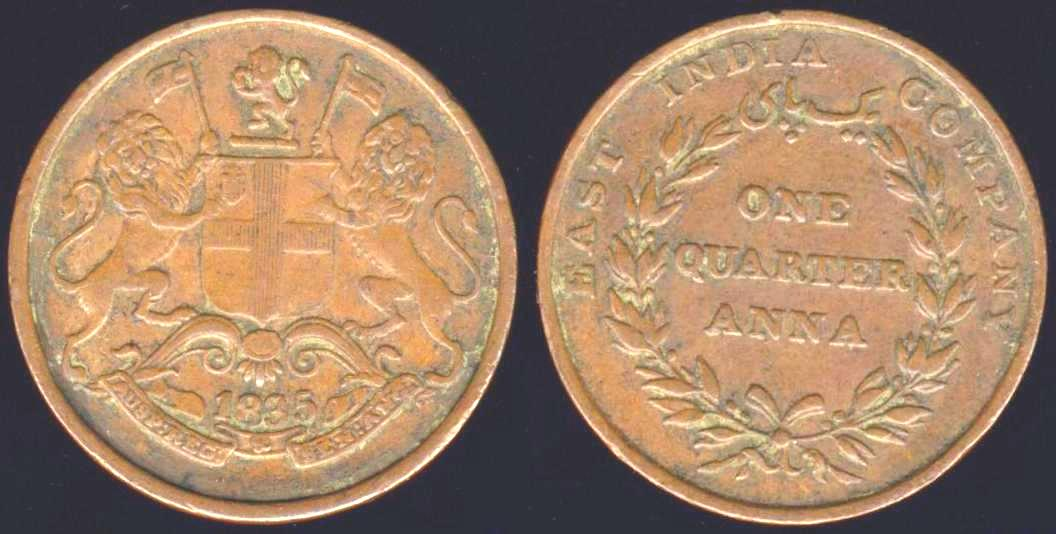
1835 East India Company quarter anna, part of the unified coinage introduced that year

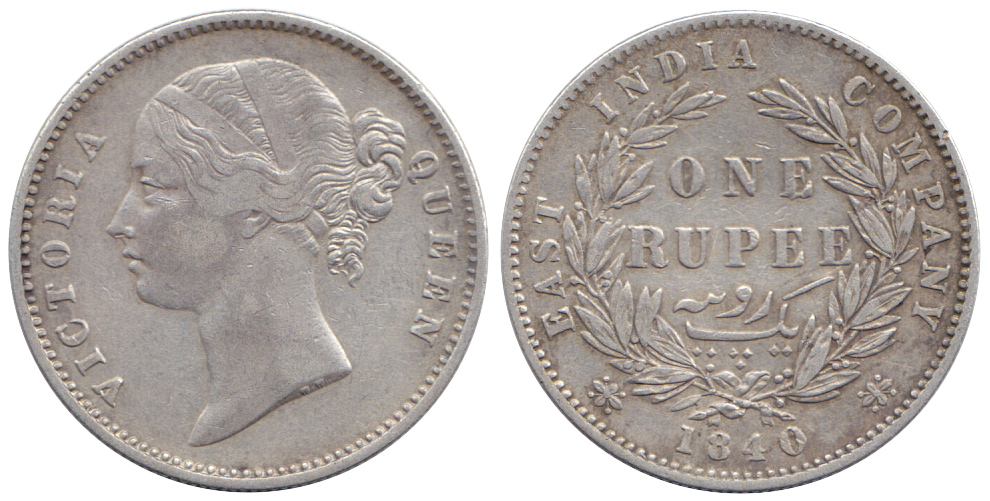
1840 East India Company rupee. It was minted in Bombay, Calcutta and Madras.

The English East India Company was granted a royal charter by Queen Elizabeth I which allowed trade monopoly with eastern countries including Sumatra, Java, and India. The territories governed by the East India Company were divided into three major administrative regions: Madras Presidency in the south, Bombay Presidency in the west, and Bengal Presidency in the east. Most of the north, however, for a long time continued to remain under the control of the Mughal emperor, and later, local rulers including the Marathas and Rajputs. Each of the three presidencies under East India Company governance issued their own coins until a unified coinage throughout all territories was introduced in 1835. Early presidency issues often imitated local issues and the Mughal design in order to gain wider acceptance by the native population.

Early European style coins were not popular outside jurisdiction of their respective settlements. In spite of having their own mints, the EIC either sent its bullion to the Mughal mints or forged the common coins of the contemporary Mughal Emperor. In 1717, the EIC obtained rights to strike coins in the name of the Mughal emperor Farrukhsiyar on the island of Bombay.

=== Madras Presidency ===
The major mints in the west responsible for issuing coins for the East India Company included Surat, Bombay (Mumbai or Munbai), and Ahmadabad. From 1621 till 1800, the English sent their precious metal bullion to the Surat mint, controlled by the Nawab, to be coined into local gold mohurs and silver rupees. As the Surat mint was unable to meet the required production rate, silver was also sent to the Ahmadabad mint in 1636. During later years, the Ahmadabad mint also struck rupees for the Bombay Presidency in the name of Muhammad Akbar II with the dates 1233–1241 AH (1817–1825 CE).

In December 1672, the East India Company started a mint in Bombay and European style gold, silver, copper, and tin coins were struck. The gold coin was named Carolina, the silver coin Anglina, the copper Copperoon, and the tin coin called the Tinny. The exchange rate was set at 11 Tiduckone Copperoon and 48 Copperoons to one Anglina. No gold coins (Carolinas) were struck until 1717. The obverse of the silver and copper coins showed inside an inner circle the arms of the Company, and within an outer circle the legend HON:SOC:ANG:IND:ORI, for Honorabilis Societas Anglicana Indiarum Orientalium, or Honourable English East India Company. The reverse of these coins had the inscription MON BOMBAY ANGLIC REGIMS A° 7° in the centre and another legend A DEO PAX & INCREMENTVM around it.

After issuing coins for the East India Company for a number of years, the Surat mint finally came under direct control of the Company in 1800. Gold mohurs, silver rupees, and fractional values were struck in the name of the Mughal emperor Shah Alam II bearing the frozen regnal year 46. The Surat mint was finally closed down in 1815. A number of privy marks consisting of dots, crescents, and crown-like symbols were used and are helpful in correct attribution of the striking period and mint.

=== Bengal Presidency ===
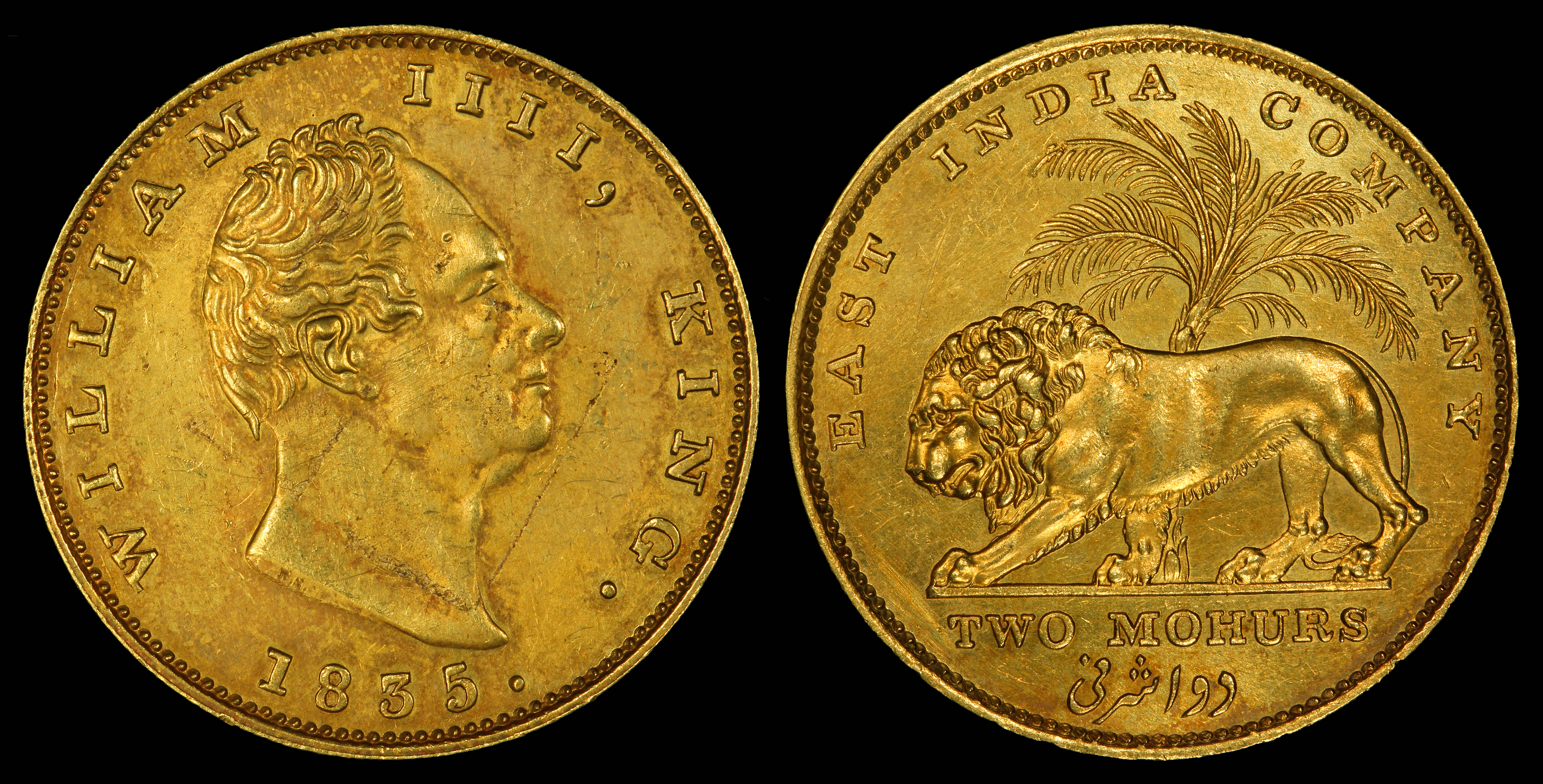
Double Mohur, 1835

In 1690 Job Charnock of the British East India Company established a trading post near what became Fort William (in present-day Kolkata). In 1757 the EIC gained the right to mint coinage in Bengal. The Company's Bengal Presidency became a regional territorial power after the 1764 Battle of Buxar. As an outcome of the Indian defeat at Buxar, Shuja-ud-Daula of Oudh and the Mughal Emperor Shah Alam II signed the Treaty of Allahabad, granting the East India Company rights to collect revenues from large parts of eastern India. Early Bengal Presidency issues were struck by mints under the name of the Mughal Emperor Alamgir II (r. 1754–1759), and later of Shah Alam II (r. 1760–1806).

The system of coinage values used (which eventually became an Indian standard until decimalisation on 1 April 1957) used the ratios:

- 1 pie = 1/3 pice = 1/12 anna
- 1 pice = 1/4 anna = 1/64 rupee
- 1 anna = 1/16 rupee
- 15 rupees (approximately) = 1 mohur

The Bengal Residency government ordered the coining of sikka rupees from 1793 for use as legal tender.

== Imperial coinage ==
After the Indian Rebellion of 1857–58, the administration of British India was transferred from the East India Company to the British Crown. From 1862 till Indian independence in 1947, circulation coins were minted under the direct authority of the Crown. The early imperial issued coins continued to bear a fixed date, for example, rupee coins with the year 1862. This practice was intended to discourage the prevalent 'batta' system, i.e., a heavy penalty imposed by money changers or 'shroffs' on coins bearing an older date to account for wear and weight loss, irrespective of the actual condition of the coin.

=== Victoria Queen and Empress ===
==== Gold coinage ====
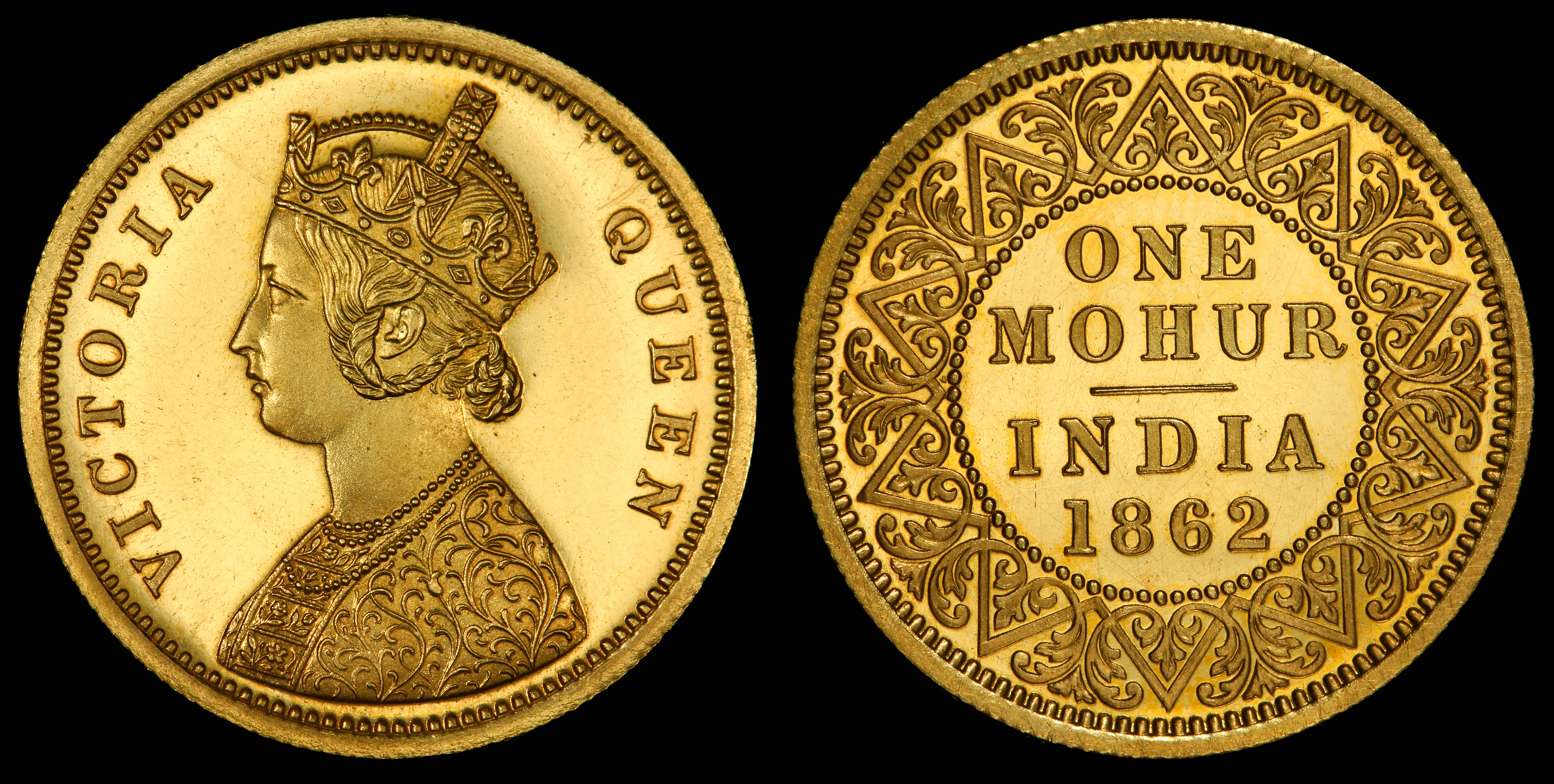
Victoria Queen one mohur, dated 1862, Calcutta mint.

Early gold coinage with Queen Victoria's crowned bust consisted of one mohur coins dated 1862. These coins were of the same weight (11.66 grams = one Tola) and fineness (0.9167) as the EIC issued mohurs. These coins, probably minted between 1866 and 1869, were trade coinage and not recognized as legal tender. A number of varieties (including proofs) are known with minor variations in the reverse and obverse decoration details. 'Victoria Queen' mohurs were also struck with the year 1875, as well as 1870 proof issues with a mature bust of Victoria.

In 1876, Victoria assumed the title of 'Empress of India' and, from 1877, the legend on the obverse of all coins was changed to 'Victoria Empress'. Gold mohurs with the new obverse legend were issued between 1877 and 1891. The mintage of these mohurs for any given date is relatively low, making them considerably scarce. Fractional values of the mohur (nominally valued at fifteen silver rupees) were also struck in denominations of ten and five rupees between 1870 and 1879. Except for a small number of ten and five rupees dated 1870, most of the fractional mohurs were proof issues. Varieties with both the younger and mature busts exist.

==== Silver coinage ====
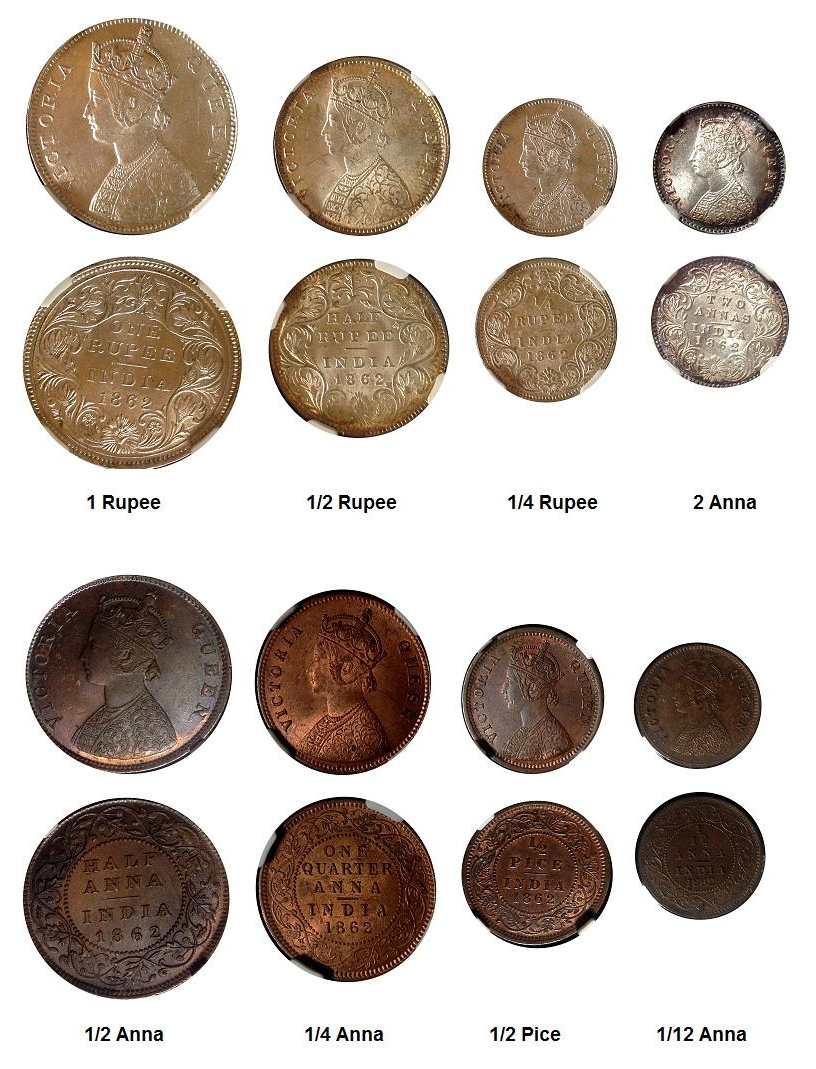
Type-set of Queen Victoria coins, silver and copper, all dated 1862. The one rupee coin, struck at the Bombay mint, has 2 dots below the top flower and 0 dots above the bottom flower (2/0).

Currency and proof issues of the 1862 dated rupee coins have a number of different obverse and reverse die varieties, which are helpful in identification of the mint. The design of the coin, however, remained largely unchanged. From 1863 till 1875, the Bombay mint introduced an unusual system of dots to date the coins. These dots occur on the reverse below the date, above the word 'ONE', or in both positions. From 1874, this practice was halted and coins began to be dated continuously. From this development, it may be inferred that by this time the 'batta' system must have all but disappeared. As with all other Victoria coinage, the title on the obverse was changed from 'Victoria Queen' to 'Victoria Empress' in 1877. Calcutta mint coins usually carry no mint mark or an incused 'C' at the bottom of the reverse. Bombay mint issues are usually marked by a raised bead below the date, or a raised/incused 'B' in the top or bottom flower, with some exceptions. Rupee coins with Victoria's bust were minted until her death in 1901.

Fractional denominations of half rupee, quarter rupee, and two annas were also issued under Victoria's reign. The dot-dating system was not used for these denominations, and is unique to the 1862 dated Bombay rupees. Similar to the rupee coins, the title of Queen was changed to Empress in 1877. The Bombay and Calcutta issues have mint identification marks similar to the rupee issues (no mark or 'C' incused for Calcutta, bead or raised/incused 'B' for Bombay). Different reverse and obverse die varieties are known for each denomination.

=== Edward VII ===
Indian rupee featuring bust of Edward VII
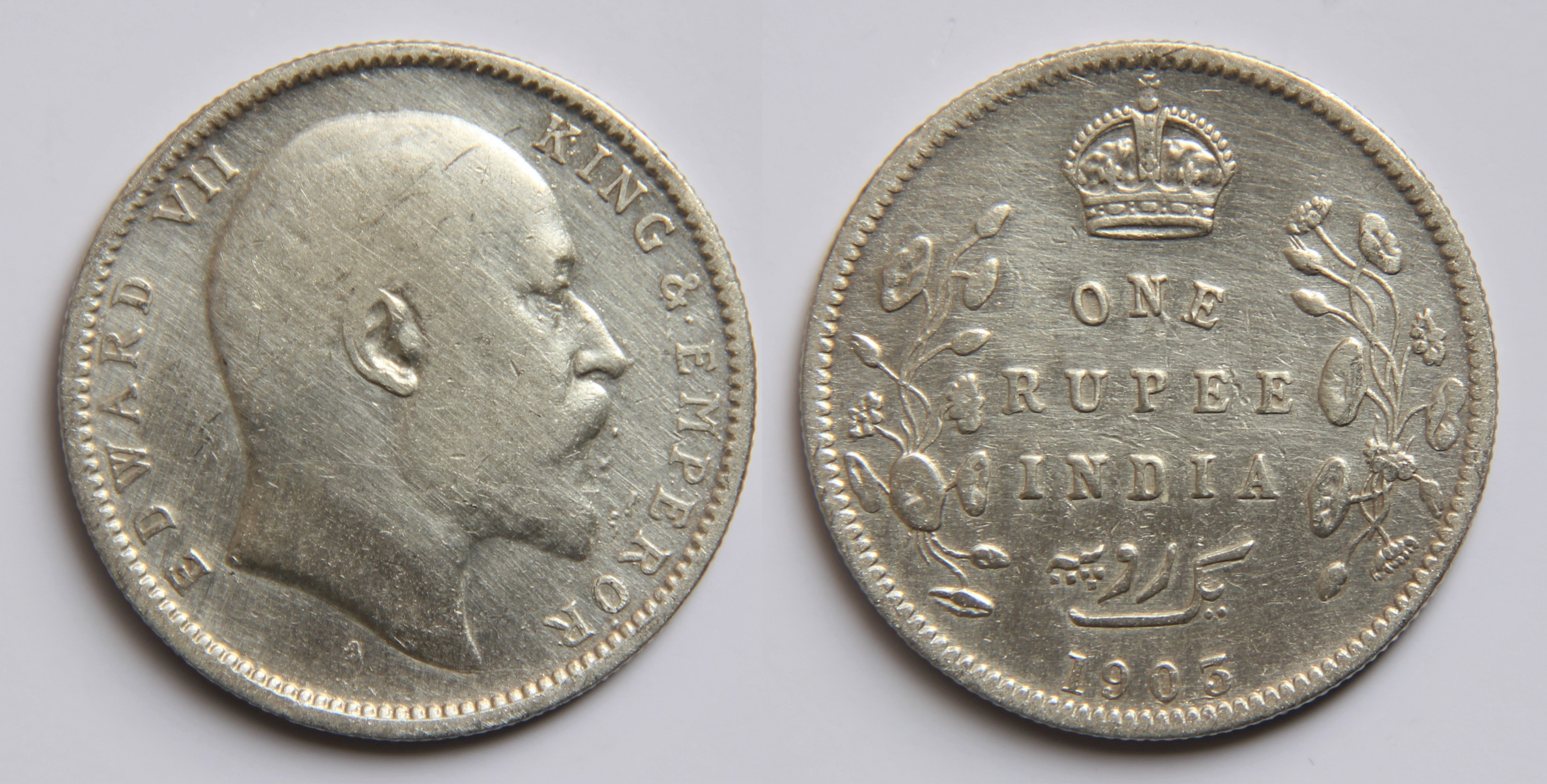
First side of the image: Obverse: Profile of Edward VII surrounded by his name
Second side of the image: Reverse: Face value, country and date. Spray of lotus flowers on each side and a crown above
Made of 91.7% silver. This particular coin was struck at the Kolkata mint.

Coins featuring the effigy of Edward VII were issued in denominations of 1/12 anna, 1/2 pice, 1/4 anna, 1 anna, 2 annas, 1/4 rupee, 1/2 rupee and 1 rupee.

All coins featured an uncrowned effigy of Edward VII by George William De Saules. This was a break from tradition, as only coins issued for use in the United Kingdom itself can show an uncrowned effigy, whereas colonies and Dominions could only use a crowned effigy of the King wearing the heraldic Tudor Crown, the Ermine Robe of State, and the Collar of the Order of Bath. The 1 anna coin was the only coin issued to use the crowned effigy, whereas patterns for a 1/2 anna piece and gold and silver patterns for 1 anna pieces featured the crowned effigy as well.

=== George V ===
Indian rupee featuring bust of George V
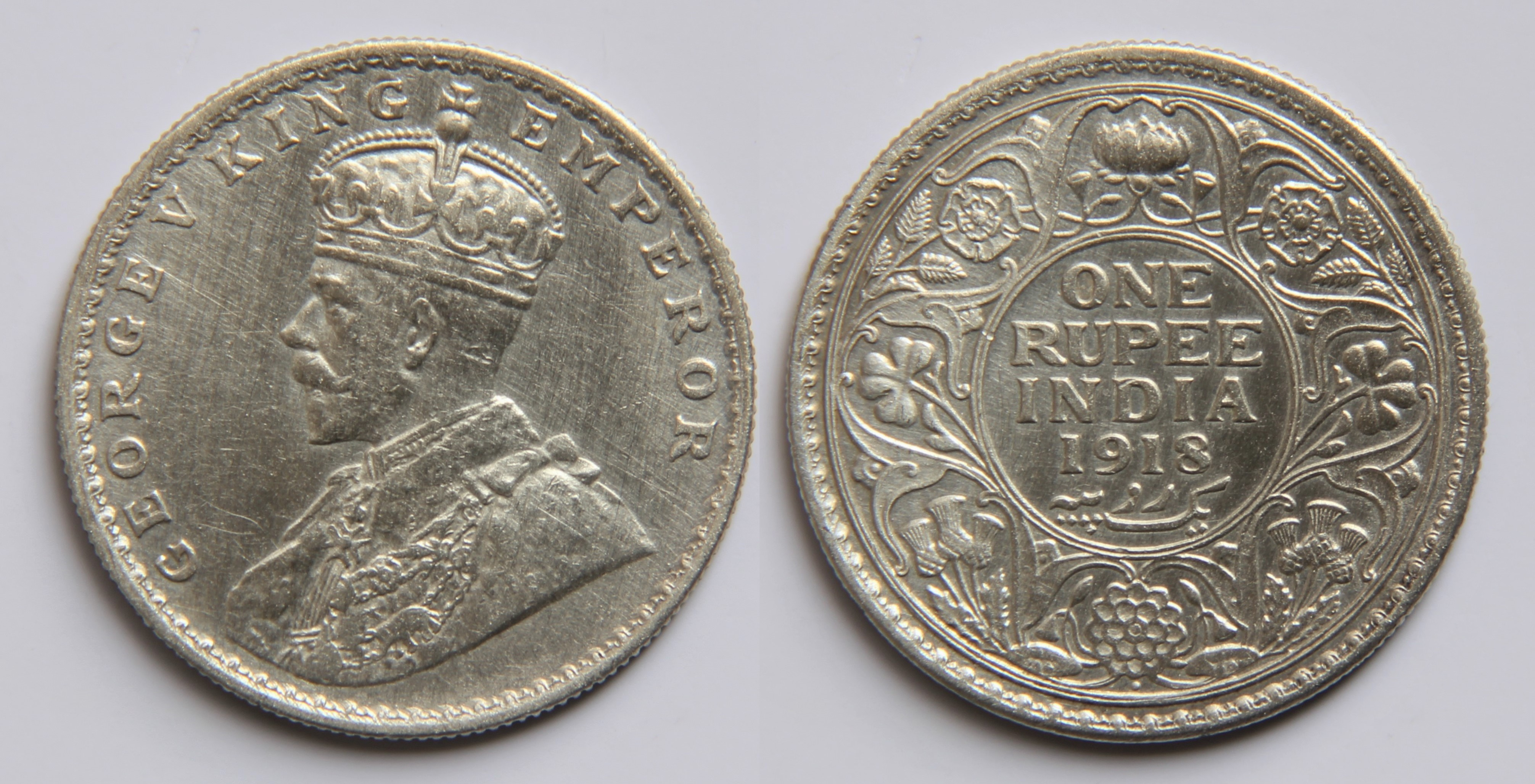
First side of the image: Obverse: Profile of George V surrounded by his name
Second side of the image: Reverse: Face value, country and date
Made of 91.7% silver

The effigy of George V by Bertram Mackennal used here, although used on other coins in many parts of the British Empire, is a slight variation to the regular design in that the Most Noble Order of the Garter collar on the King's robe is replaced by the Order of the Indian Empire. The modification caused controversy, in that a 1911 One Rupee coin, also known as the Pig Rupee, had to be redesigned to ensure that Muslims did not confuse the elephant on the King's collar for a pig.

=== Edward VIII ===
During the short reign of Edward VIII, no coins were issued in India bearing his portrait. Some Indian Princely States, such as of Kutch and Jodphur issued coins that bore his name in Indian Script. Several coins bearing the portrait of Edward VIII are sometimes offered for sale on online auction sites, but these "coins" are almost certainly modern productions and were never officially issued.

=== George VI ===
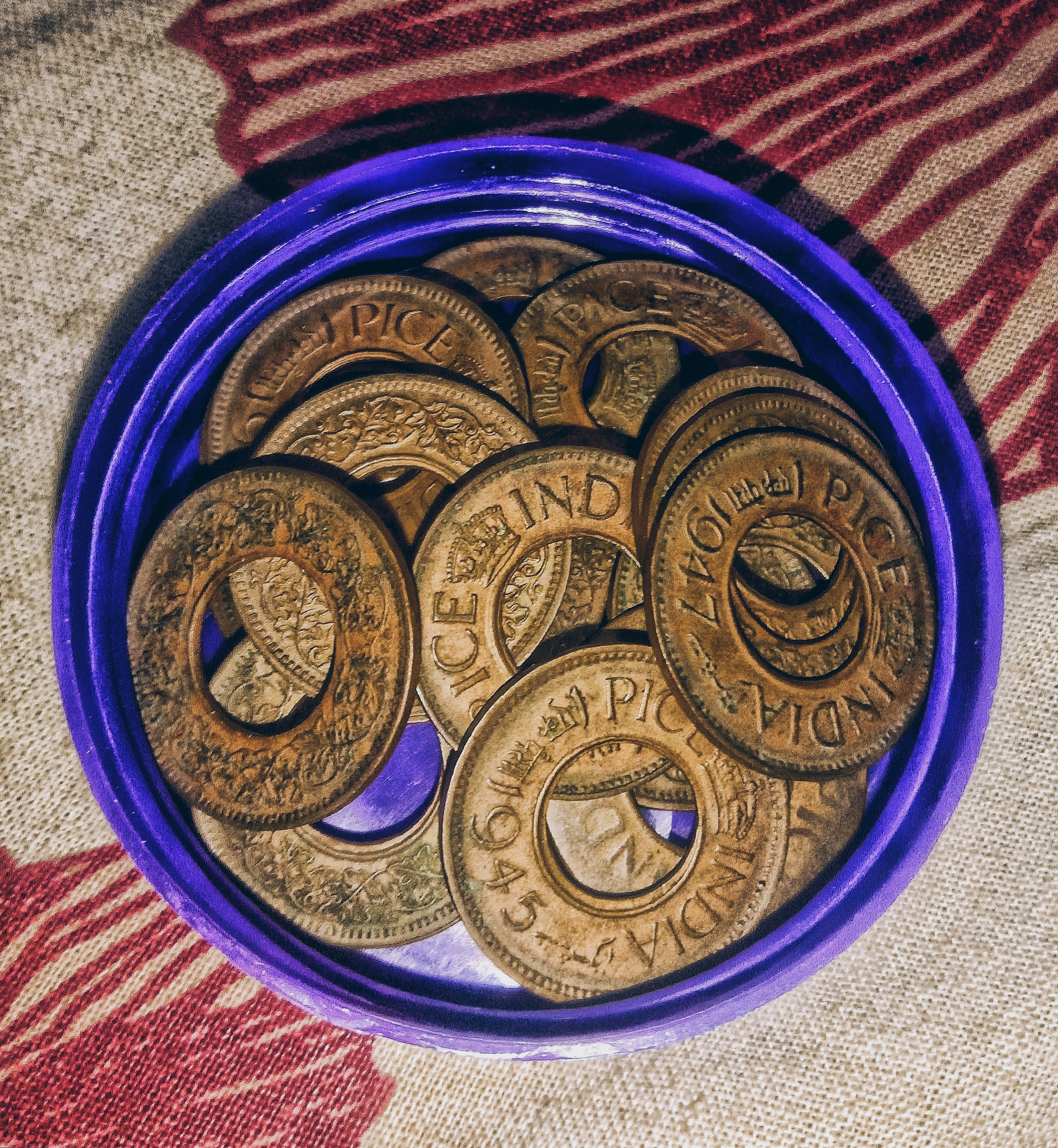
One pice coins from British India

1939 rupee change in silver content wartime measures

Coins of the following denominations were issued:

- 1/12 anna (1/3 pice)
- 1/2 pice
- 1/4 anna
- Pice (1/4 anna)
- 1/2 anna
- Anna
- 2 annas
- 4 annas (1/4 rupee)
- 1/4 rupee
- 8 annas (1/2 rupee)
- 1/2 rupee
- One rupee
- 5 rupees (1/3 mohur)
- 10 rupees (2/3 mohur)
- 15 rupees (mohur)
- 30 rupees (2 mohur)
- British gold sovereign, as an emergency war issue, in 1918.

There are many rare coins of this period which interest coin collectors. The 1939 rupee is the most expensive rupee, as after 1939 all silver coins effectively became less pure, due to the shortage of silver during World War II. The 1947 rupee, half rupee, quarter rupee and anna coins are also of special interest to collectors, since that was the last year British issued coins were circulated in India.

== Under INA ==
During World War II, the Indian National Army (INA), led by Subhas Chandra Bose, seized Mizoram, Manipur and parts of Nagaland from colonial British control with the help of Japanese forces. British Indian rupee and coins were banned and a Japanese rupee (1942–44) was introduced.

== See also ==
- History of Rupee
- Indian coinage
- Indian paisa
- Indian rupee
- Modern Indian coins
