= Postal orders of the Indian Field Force in Egypt =

Postal orders were prepared for, but not issued, by the Indian Field Force in Egypt in between 1883 and 1885. Only five extant examples of these unissued postal orders are recorded, all of the 1 Rupee denomination. These bear the serial numbers 00092, 00094, 00210, 00235, and 00238.

These are very similar to the Indian postal order issues of 1883–86, which have the British Coat-of-Arms at the top, but are inscribed 'Head Post Master, Indian Field Force, Egypt'. They have a 1 Rupee postage stamp affixed to the centre panel between the datestamp circles above the inscription 'Commission 6 pies'.
