= Indian paisa =

Subdivision of the Indian rupee

Paisa
- India
- Value: 0.01 Indian Rupee
- Edge: Plain
- Composition: 1957–2011
- Years of minting: 1957–2011

Obverse

Reverse

The Indian paisa (plural: paise) is a 1/100 (one-hundredth) subdivision of the Indian rupee. The paisa was first introduced on 1 April 1957 after decimalisation of the Indian rupee.

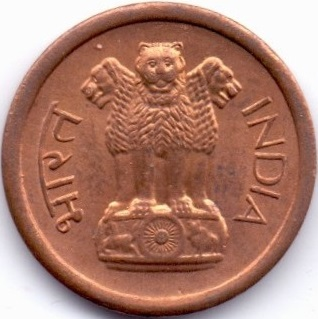

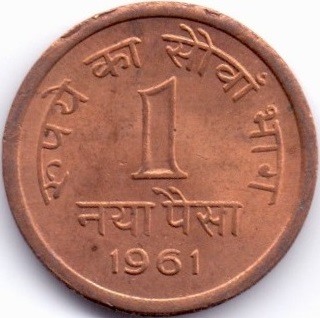
a one paisa coin

In 1955, the Government of India first amended the Indian Coinage Act and adopted the "metric system for coinage". From 1957 to 1964, the paisa was called naya paisa (transl. 'new paisa') to distinguish it from the old paisa/pice which was a 1/64 subdivision of the Indian Rupee. On 1 June 1964, the term "naya" was dropped and the denomination was named paisa. Paisa has been issued in 1, 2, 3, 5, 10, 20, 25, and 50 paise coins. The paisa currency was officially demonetized in 2011, thus as of 2026, coins of the denomination of 1 rupee are the lowest value in use.

== History ==
Prior to 1957, the Indian rupee was not decimalised and the rupee from 1835 to 1957 was further divided into 16 annas. Each anna was further divided to four Indian pices and each pice into three pies till 1947 when the pie was demonetised.

Denomination	Corresponding value	From	To	Comments
One Indian rupee	Sixteen Indian anna	1835	1947	
One Indian rupee	Sixteen Indian anna	1947	1950	
One Indian rupee	Sixteen Indian anna	1950	1957	
One Indian rupee	Hundred paise	1957	1964	Naya paisa series
One Indian rupee	Hundred paise	1964	Present	Except 50 paise, rest all paise, anna, pice and pies coins demonetised.
One Indian anna	Four Indian pice	1835	1947	
One Indian anna	Four Indian pice	1947	1950	
One Indian anna	Four Indian pice	1950	1957	Anna and pice demonetised in 1957.
One Indian pice	Three Indian pies	1835	1947	Pies demonetised in 1947.
One Indian rupee = 100 paise = 16 anna = 64 pice = 192 pies.

== Coins ==
=== Naya paisa series (1957–1964) ===
Naya paisa series
Value	Technical parameters				Description			Year of minting		Monetary status
Value	Weight	Diameter	Thickness	Metal	Edge	Obverse	Reverse	First	Last	Monetary status
1 naya paisa	1.5 g	16 mm	1 mm	Bronze	Plain	State Emblem of India and country name in Hindi and English.	Face-value and year.	1957	1962	Demonetised.
2 naya Paise	2.95 g	18 mm	1.80 mm	Cupronickel	Smooth	State Emblem of India and country name in Hindi and English.	Face-value and year.	1957	1963	Demonetised.
5 naya paise										
10 naya paise										
20 naya paise										
50 naya paise										

=== Paisa series (1964–2011) ===
Paisa – Aluminum series
Value	Technical parameters				Description			Year of minting		Monetary status
Value	Mass	Diameter	Thickness	Metal	Edge	Obverse	Reverse	First	Last	Monetary status
1 paisa	0.75 g	17 mm	1.72 mm	Aluminium	Smooth	State Emblem of India and country name in Hindi and English.	Face-value and year.	1965	1981	Demonetised.
2 paise	1.0 g	20 mm	1.58 mm	Aluminium	Smooth	State Emblem of India and country name in Hindi and English.	Face-value and year.	1965	1981	Demonetised.
3 paise	1.2 g	21 mm	2.0 mm	Aluminium	Smooth	State Emblem of India and country name in Hindi and English.	Face-value and year.	1964	1971	Demonetised.
5 paise	1.5 g	22.0 mm	2.17 mm	Aluminium	Smooth	State Emblem of India country name and face-value.	Year and "Save for development" lettering. Coin minted to commemorate FAO.	1977	1977	Demonetised.
10 paise	2.27 g	25.91 mm	1.92 mm	Aluminium	Smooth	State Emblem of India and country name in Hindi and English.	Face-value and year.	1971	1982	Demonetised.
20 paise	2.2 g	26 mm	1.7 mm	Aluminium	Smooth	State Emblem of India and country name in Hindi and English.	Face-value and year.	1982	1997	Demonetised.
25 paise	2.83 g	19.05 mm	1.55 mm	Aluminium	Smooth	State Emblem of India and country name in Hindi and English.	Face-value and year.	1957	2002	Demonetised.
50 paise	2.9 g	19 mm	1.5 mm	Aluminium	Smooth	State Emblem of India and country name in Hindi and English.	Face-value and year.	1957	2002	Demonetised.

=== Mint mark ===
- No mintmark = Kolkata
- ⧫ = Mumbai mint
- B = Mumbai Proof issues
- * = Hyderabad
- ° = Noida

== Demonetization ==
The paisa currency was announced to be withdrawn soon on 20 December 2010. The demonetization of the paisa currency came into effect on 30 June 2011, when the Reserve Bank of India ceased the circulation and minting of paisa coins.

== Symbol ==
Proposed symbol for Paisa

A symbol for the paisa ⟨⟩ was designed using the same concept as the symbol for rupee. However, the proposed symbol never appeared on any coin, as the Reserve Bank of India had stopped minting any paisa coins before this proposal.

== See also ==
- Paisa
- History of the rupee
