= India Government Mint, Hyderabad =

Mint established in 1803

- Predecessor: Royal Mint (Mint of Nizam)
- Formation: 1803; 223 years ago
- Founder: Nizam of Hyderabad
- Founded at: Sultan Sahi, Moghalpura, Hyderabad, India
- Merger of: Nizam of Hyderabad's mint
- Type: Public sector undertaking
- Legal status: Mint
- Purpose: To mint coins.
- Headquarters: Janpath, Delhi, India
- Location: IDA Phase-II, Cherlapally, Secunderabad, India
- Coordinates: 17°28′23″N 78°36′13″E
- Key people: VNR Nayudu (Chief General Manager)
- Parent organization: SPMCIL
- Subsidiaries: None
- Website: igmhyderabad.spmcil.com
- Formerly called: Royal Mint

India Government Mint, Hyderabad is one of the four mints in India. Based in Cherlapally, Secunderabad (twin city of Hyderabad) in the Indian state of Telangana, the mint was originally established in 1803 AD as the Royal Mint to serve as the mint for the Nizam of Hyderabad. The mint was founded by Mir Akbar Ali Khan Sikander Jah, Asaf Jah III and was originally situated at Sultan Sahi in Moghalpura suburb of Hyderabad city. In 1950, the mint was taken over by the Government of India, and in 1997 it was shifted to its present location at Cherlapally in Secunderabad. Indian 1, 2, 5 and 10 rupee coins are produced in this mint.

== History ==
Till early 19th century, mints were privately operated by wealthy businessmen (Sahus, Jagirdars and Omaras) in India. Licenses for minting coins were obtained by paying fees to the exchequer. The mints used to produce coins with the name of Emperor in Delhi. FIDVI, QITAAB (title) and lettering "Yar-E-Wafadar" (trusted follower) were added to the coins.

=== 1803–1858 ===
India Government Mint, Hyderabad was established in 1803 AD by Mir Akbar Ali Khan Sikander Jah, Asaf Jah III as a private mint and along with other private mints in the country. The mint produced Indian coins in the name of Emperor of India. Initially the mint was situated at Sultan Sahi in Moghalpura suburb of the Hyderabad city. The dies were made of steel but the private mints did not have a master die. The dies hence differed in size, production of coins was crude with only partial inscription appearing on coins frequently.

=== 1858–1903 ===
With the end of the Mughal empire in 1858 AD, all private mints (except Hyderabad, Kolkata and Mumbai) were abolished. Coins produced thereafter ceased to carry the name of Emperor of India. Instead, coins produced in the Hyderabad Royal Mint were inscribed with name of the dynasty, initials of Nizam of Hyderabad and the numeral 92 (of Islamic religious significance; represents sum of symbolic numbers of the letters in Prophets and messengers in Islam). These coins were called Halli Sicca coins (current coins). In 1985 AD, use of machinery was introduced in coin making and the machine made coins were called "Charkhi coins" (Charkhi means "wheel" in Hindi).

=== 1903–1950 ===
On 13 July 1903, a new mint was established in Saifabad, Hyderabad and the operations were shifted to the new location. In 1950, post "Federal Financial Integration", the mint was over-taken by the Government of India.

=== 1950–1997 ===
The Hyderabad mint operated in Saifabad from 1950 to 1997. On 20 August 1997, the mint was shifted to its present location at Cherlapally in the city of Secunderabad, India. The facility was established with annual production capacity of 700 million coins and 950 million planchets.

=== 1997 – present ===
India Government Mint in Hyderabad has been operating at the same location since 1997. As a result of the corporatisation, from 13 January 2006 the mint is functioning as one of the units of the Security Printing & Minting Corporation of India Limited (SPMCIL).

== Organization ==
Since 13 January 2006, the India Government Mint, Hyderabad functions as one of the units of the "Security Printing & Minting Corporation of India Limited". The mint is headed by a "general manager".

== Mint mark ==
Coins minted at the India Government Mint, Hyderabad carries the mint mark of a five-pointed star (*), symbolising that the coin was produced in the Hyderabad mint.

== Production ==
The India Government Mint in Hyderabad was planned with an estimated annual production capacity of annual production capacity of 700 million coins and 950 million planchets. Indian rupee coins (1, 2, 5 & 10) are produced in this mint.
