= Paisa =

Idiom and monetary unit

Paisa (also transliterated as pice, pesa, poysha, poisha and baisa) is a monetary unit in several countries. The word is also a generalised idiom for money and wealth. In India, Nepal, and Pakistan, the paisa currently equals 1/100 of a rupee. In Bangladesh, the paisa equals 1/100 of a Bangladeshi taka. In Oman, the baisa equals 1/1000 of an Omani rial.

== Etymology ==
The word paisa is from the Sanskrit term padāṁśa (पदांश, basic unit), meaning 'quarter part base', from pada (पद) "foot or quarter or base" and aṁśa (अंश) "part or unit". The pesa was also in use in colonial Kenya. The colloquial term for money in Burmese, paiksan (ပိုက်ဆံ), is derived from the Hindi term paisa (पैसा).

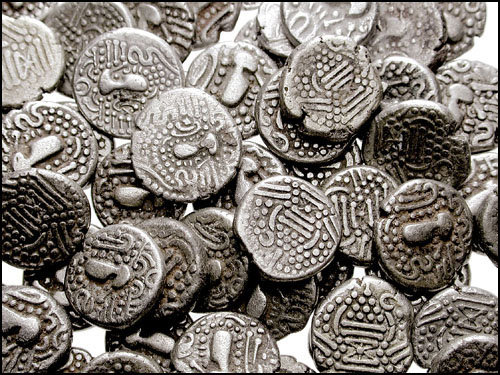
Chaulukyas. 9th–10th century. Lot of sixty-eight AR 'Gadhaiya Paise'

== History ==
Chaulukya coins were often called "Gadhaiya Paise" (9th–10th century CE). Until the 1950s in India and Pakistan (and before 1947 in British India), the paisa (back then spelled as pice in English) was equivalent to 3 pies, 1/4 of an anna, or 1/64 of a rupee. After the transition from a non-decimal currency to a decimal currency, the paisa equaled 1/100 of a rupee and was known as a naya paisa ("new paisa") for a few years to distinguish it from the old paisa(pice) that was 1/64 of a rupee.

== Terminology ==
In Punjabi, Hindi, Bengali, Afghan Persian, Urdu, Nepali and other languages, the word paisa often means money or cash. Medieval trade routes that spanned the Arabian Sea between India, the Arab regions and East Africa spread the usage of Indian subcontinent and Arabic currency terms across these areas. The word pesa as a reference to money in East African languages such as Swahili dates from that period. An example of this usage is the older day Kenyan mobile-phone-based money transfer service M-Pesa (which stands for "mobile pesa" or "mobile money").

== Usage ==
- Paisa = 1/100 of a Bangladeshi taka (no longer in circulation)
- Paisa = 1/100 of an Indian rupee (only 50 paisa coins are de facto valid but no longer in circulation)
- Paisa = 1/100 of a Nepalese rupee (no longer in circulation)
- Baisa = 1/1000 of an Omani rial
- Paisa = 1/100 of a Pakistani rupee (Officially demonetized from 1 October 2014)

== Gallery ==
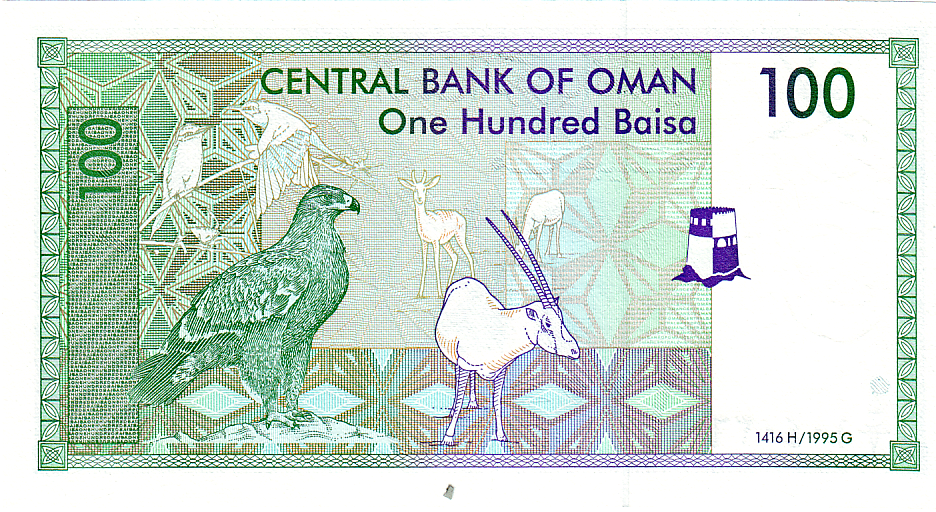
100 Omani Baisa note (reverse)

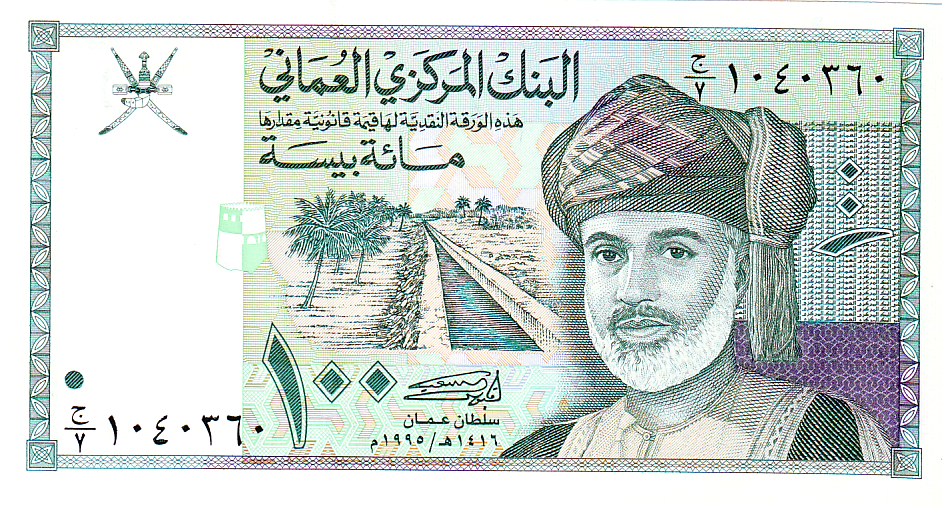
100 Omani Baisa note (1995)

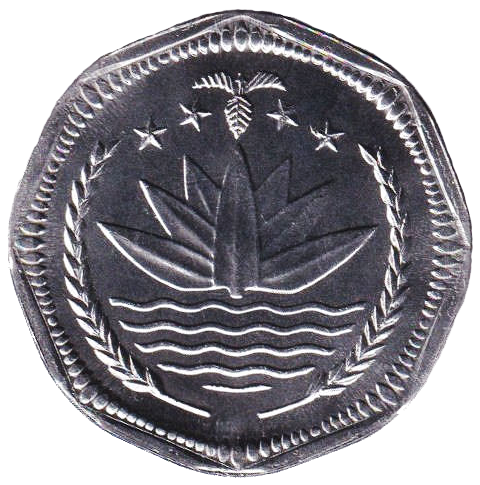
50 Bangladeshi Paisa (2001)

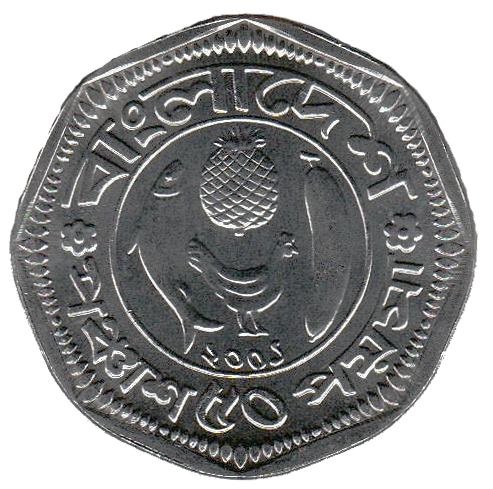
50 Bangladeshi Paisa (2001, reverse)

== See also ==
- Bangladeshi taka
- Indian paisa
- Eco-Pesa
- Peso
