= Anna (monetary subunit) =

British India currency unit, 1/16 of a rupee

1 Indian anna
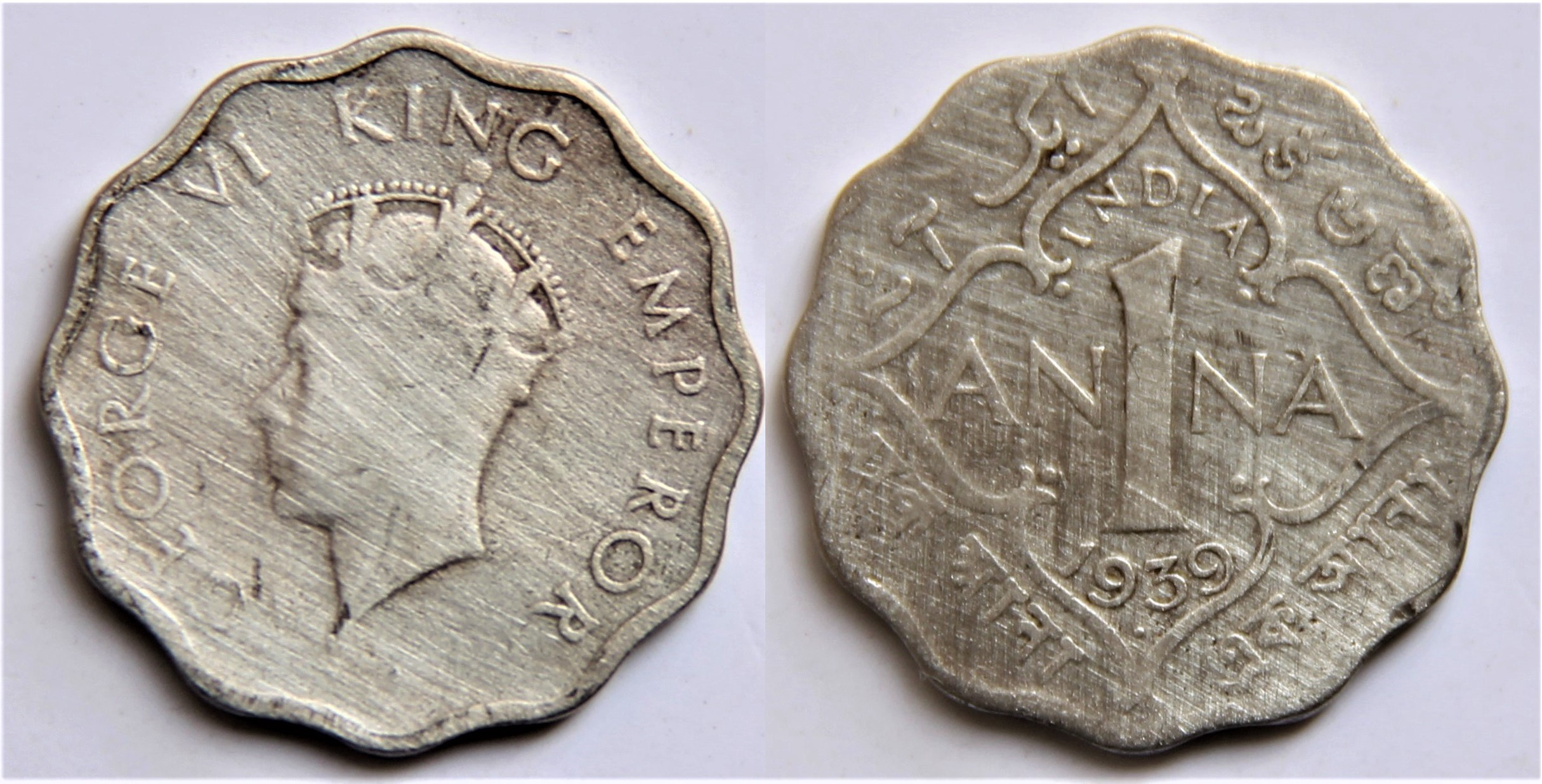
First side of the image: Obverse: Crowned bust of George VI, with lettering George VI King Emperor.
Second side of the image: Reverse: Year of minting and face value in numeral, English, Urdu, Bengali, Telugu and Devanagari scripts.
125,548,000 coins minted (1918 to 1940) in copper-nickel
One Quarter anna.
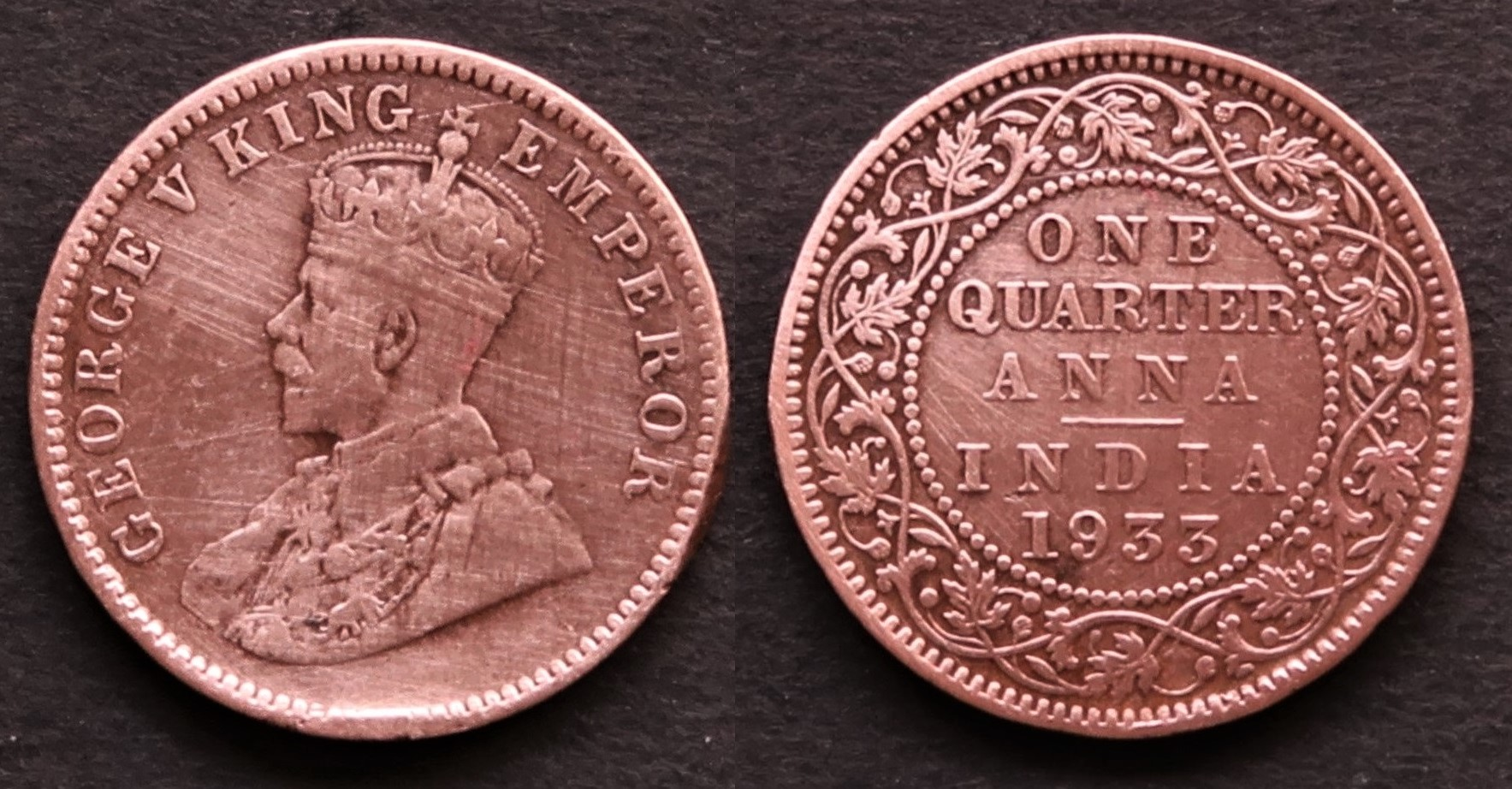
First side of the image: Obverse: King George V crowned head surrounded by lettering "GEORGE V KING EMPEROR" at the periphery.
Second side of the image: Reverse: Denomination and year surrounded by wreath. Lettering "ONE QUARTER ANNA INDIA 1933".
1,681,276,200 coins minted from 1912 to 1936.

An anna (or ānna) was a currency unit formerly used in British India, equal to 1/16 of a rupee. It was subdivided into four pices or twelve pies (thus there were 192 pies in a rupee). When the rupee was decimalised and subdivided into 100 (new) paise, one anna was therefore equivalent to 6 1/4 paise. The anna was demonetised as a currency unit when India decimalised its currency in 1957, followed by Pakistan in 1961. It was replaced by the 5-paise coin, which was itself discontinued in 1994 and demonetised in 2011. The term anna is frequently used to express a fraction of 1/16.

Anna is derived from the Sanskrit अन्न, meaning "grain".

There was a coin of one anna, and also half-anna coins of copper and two-anna pieces of silver. With the rupee having been valued at 1s 6d and weighing 180 grains as a 916.66 fine silver coin, the anna was equivalent to 1 1/8d (one penny and half a farthing). Hence the 2 anna silver coins were of low weight (22.5 grains = 1.46 g).

Anna-denominated postage stamps were issued during the British Raj by the government of British India as well as by several princely states, and after independence until decimalisation of the currency by India and Pakistan.

== Notation ==
The first number is the number of rupees, the second is the number of annas (1/16), the third is the number of paisas (1/64), and the fourth is the number of pies (1/192). Examples are given below.

- Rs 1-15-3-2 = Rs 1.9947
- Rs 1-8-3 = Rs 1.546
- Rs 1-4 = Rs 1.25

== Coins ==
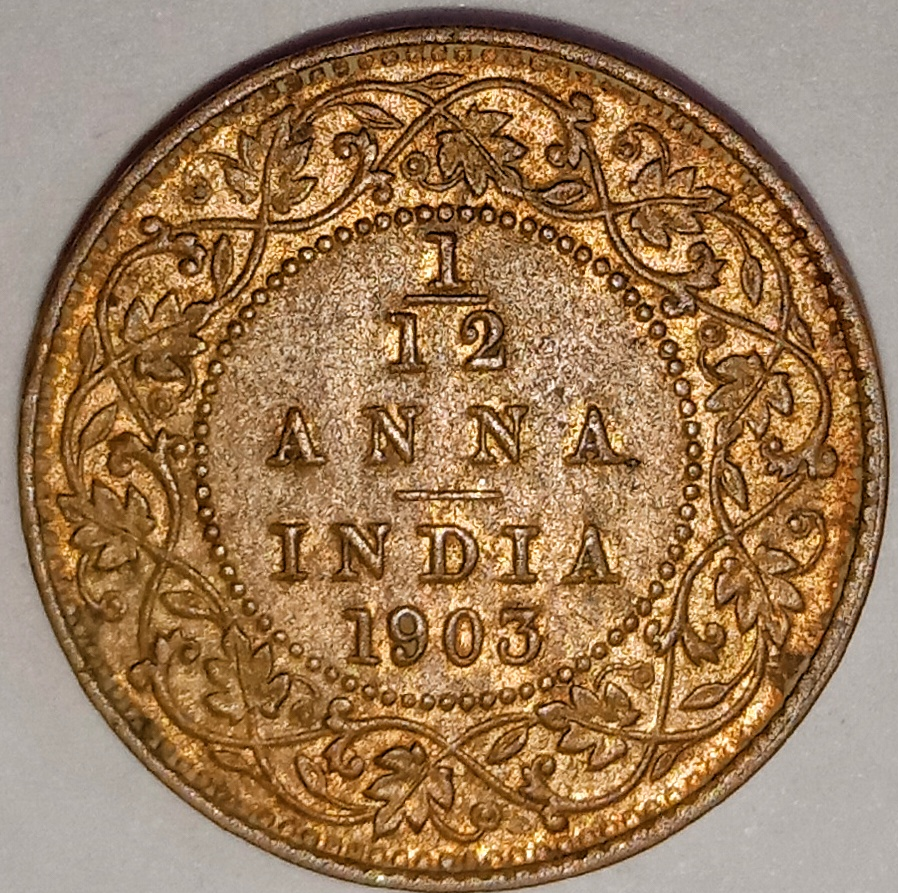
One Twelfth Anna (1/12 Anna) coin of 1903

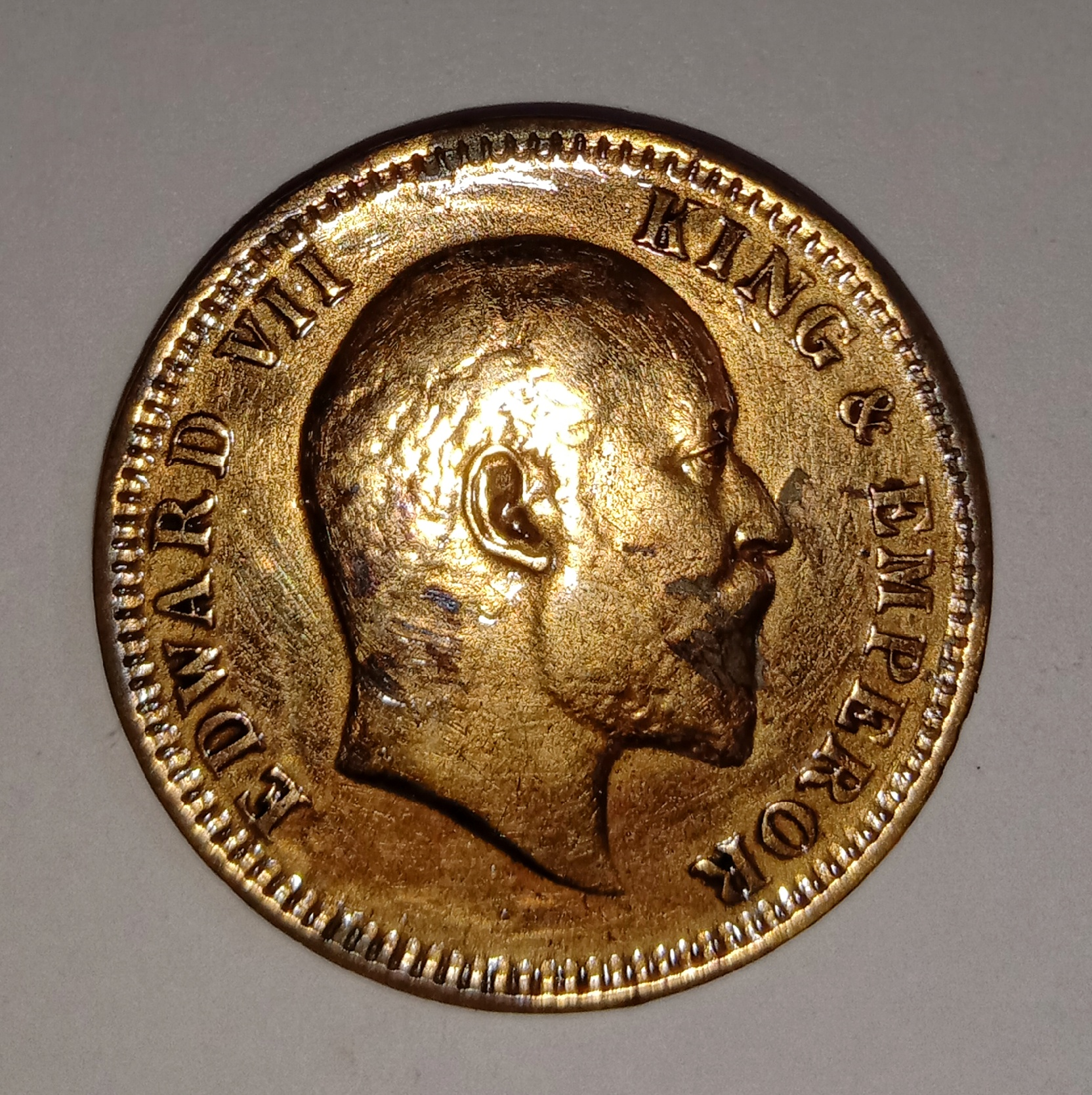
Obverse of the 1906 quarter anna, with the bust of Edward VII

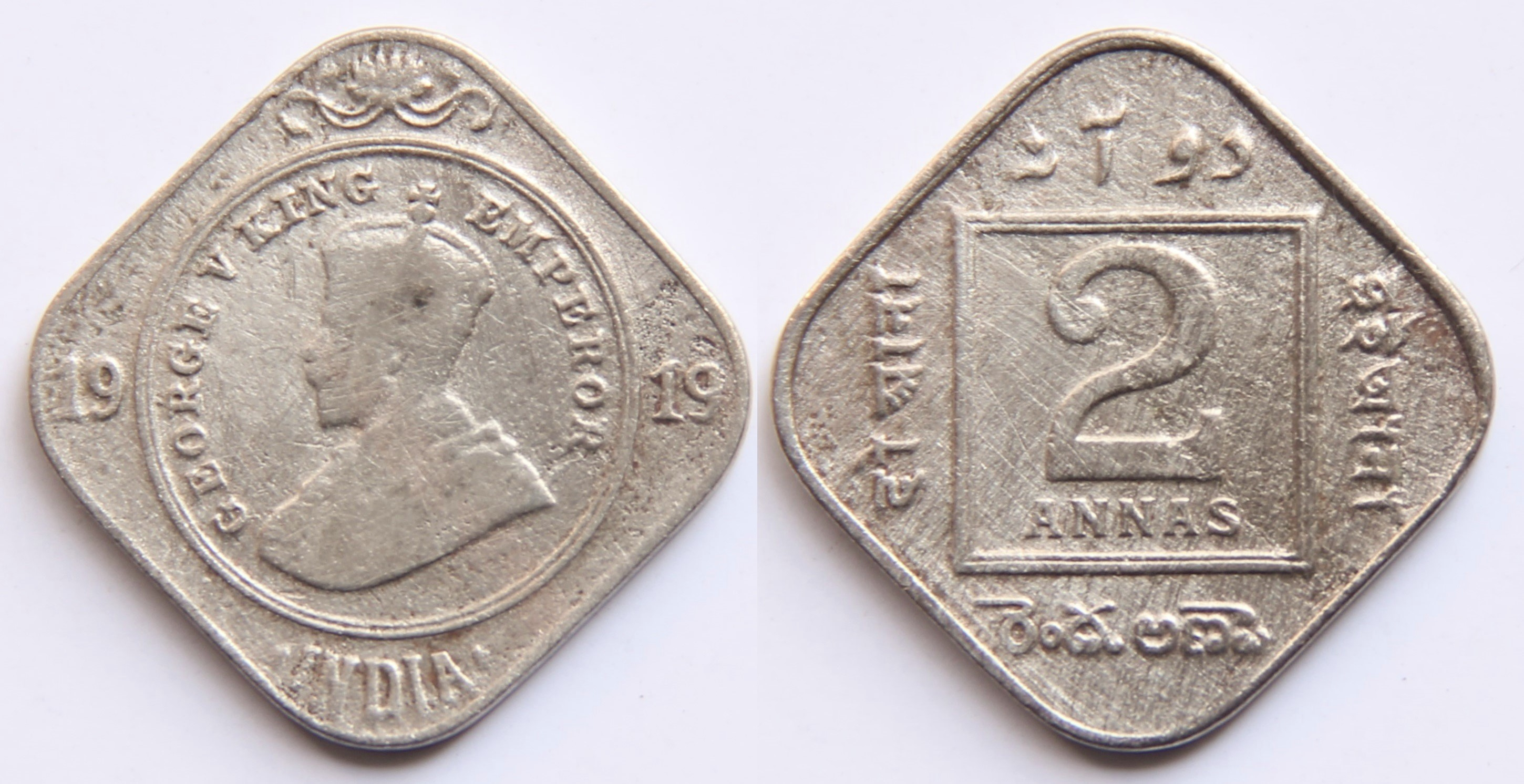
2 Indian annas (1919).

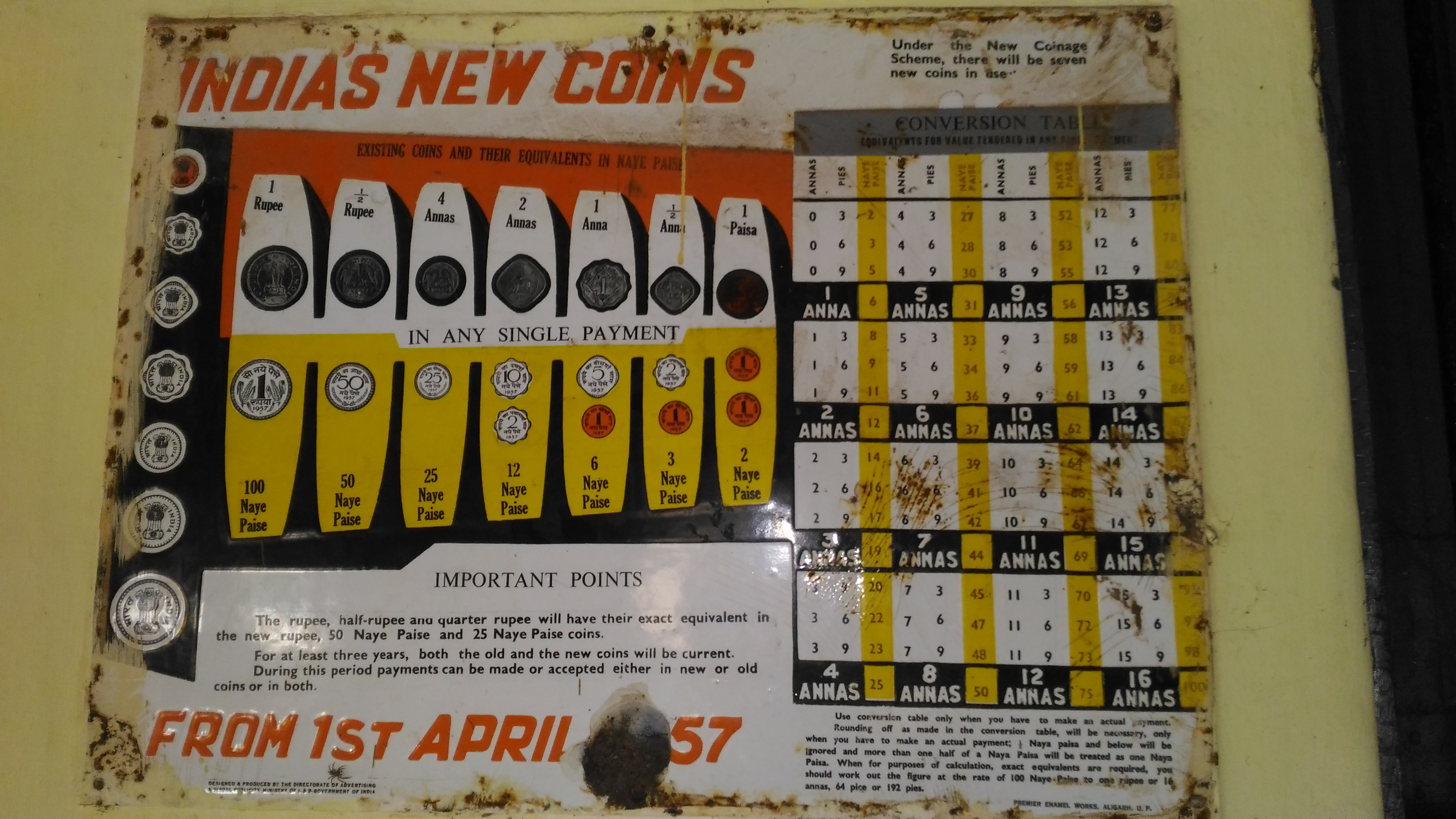
Annas - Paisa Conversion Table.

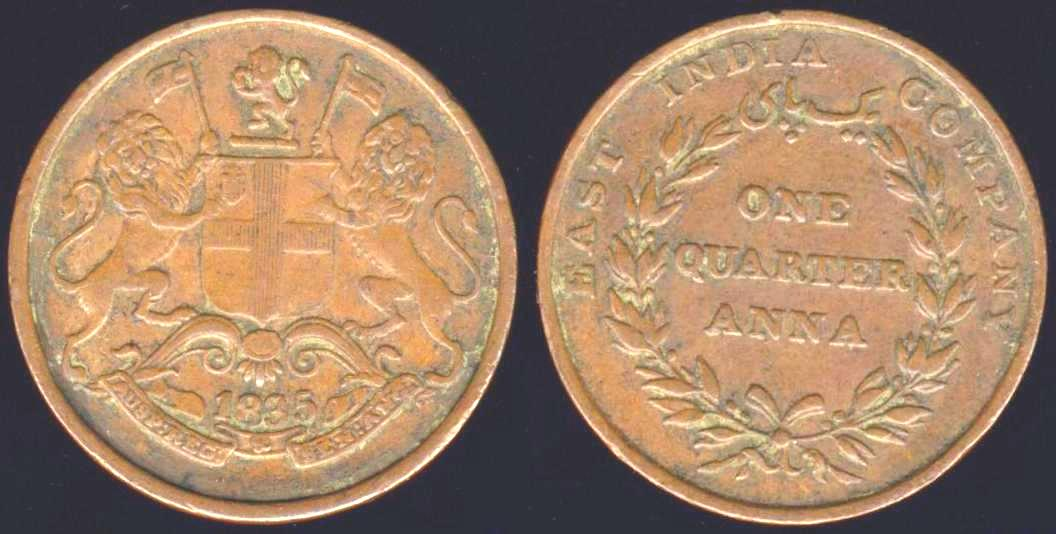
An 1835 quarter anna.

== Stamps ==
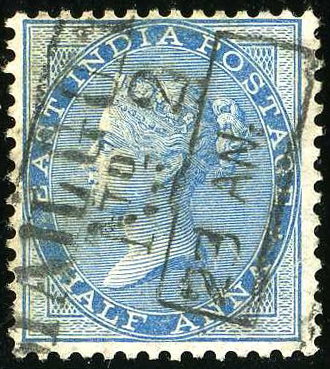
Half anna stamp of British India

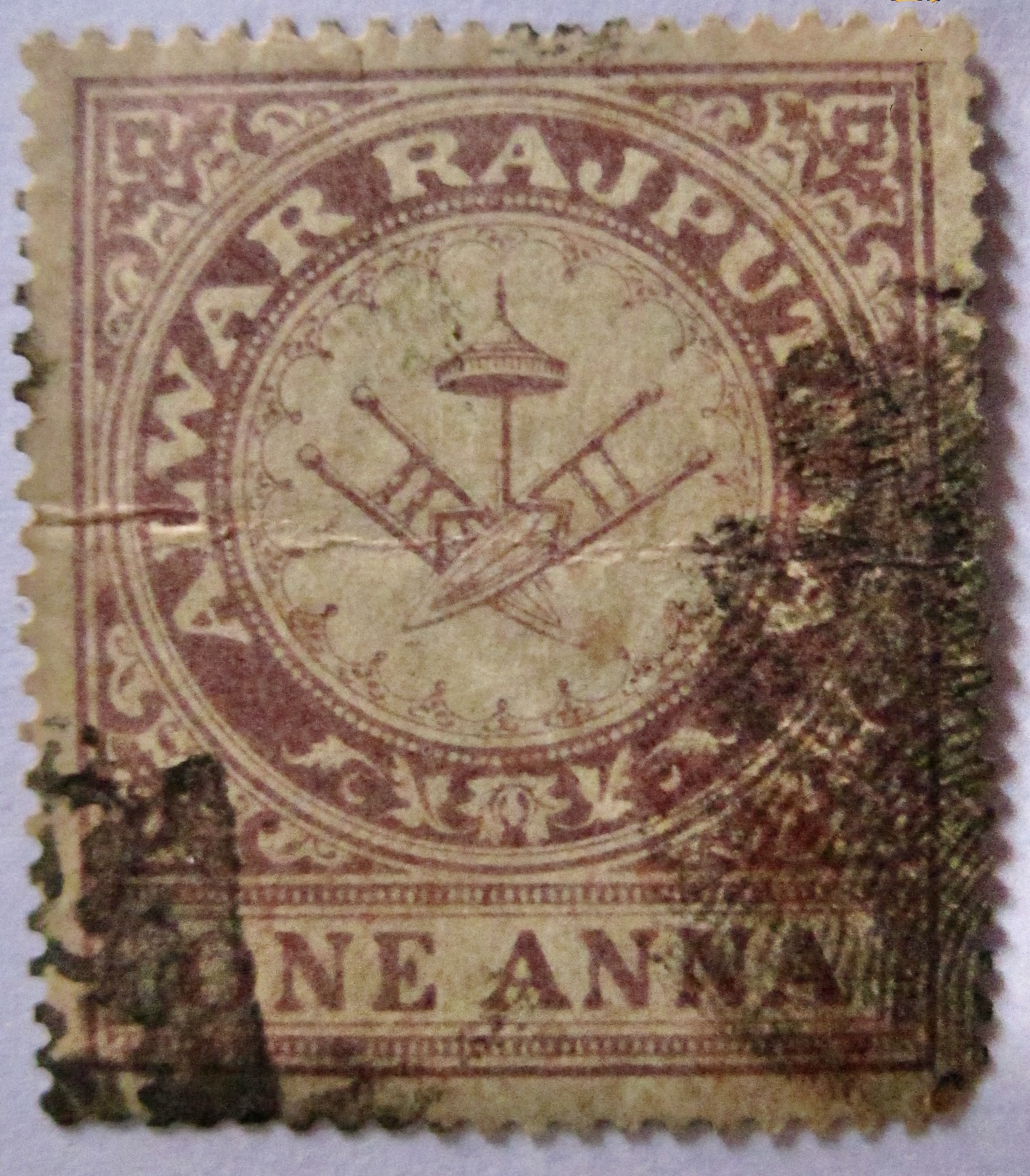
One anna stamp of Alwar

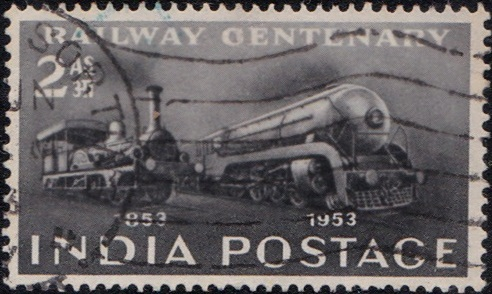
Two anna stamp of independent India

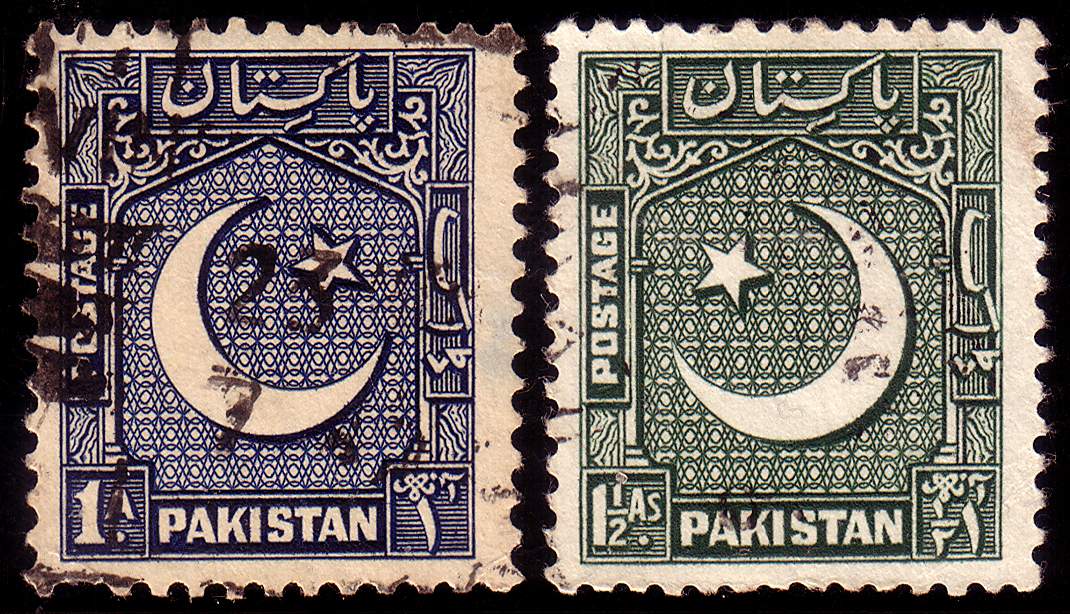
One anna and one and a half anna stamps of independent Pakistan

== See also ==
- Indian coinage
- British Indian coins
- History of the rupee
