= India Government Mint, Mumbai =

Mint opened in 1824

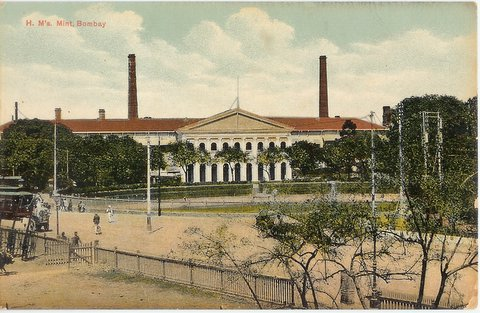
A postcard depicting the Mint.

The India Government Mint, Mumbai is one of the four mints in India and is in the city of Mumbai. The mint was established in 1824 by the then governor of the Bombay Presidency. Its main activity is the production of commemorative and development-oriented coins. The mint is opposite the Reserve Bank of India in the Fort area of South Mumbai.

Initially governed by the governor of the Bombay Presidency, it was transferred to the Government of India on 18 May 1876 through Finance Department Resolution 247. In 1918, a branch of the Royal Mint of London was set up to issue British sovereigns. In April 1919, after manufacturing 12.95 lakh (1.295 million) coins, it was shut down.

Besides coins, the mint produces medals for Ministry of Defence, Ministry of Home Affairs, educational institutions, social service institutions, badges etc. It is also a centre for the issuance of gold ingots in exchange of unrefined gold tendered by licensed dealers. The institution has a department that makes official weights and measures such as metric weights, capacity, and linear measures for state governments, laboratories and the Bureau of Indian Standards.

== Coins minted in Mumbai Mint ==
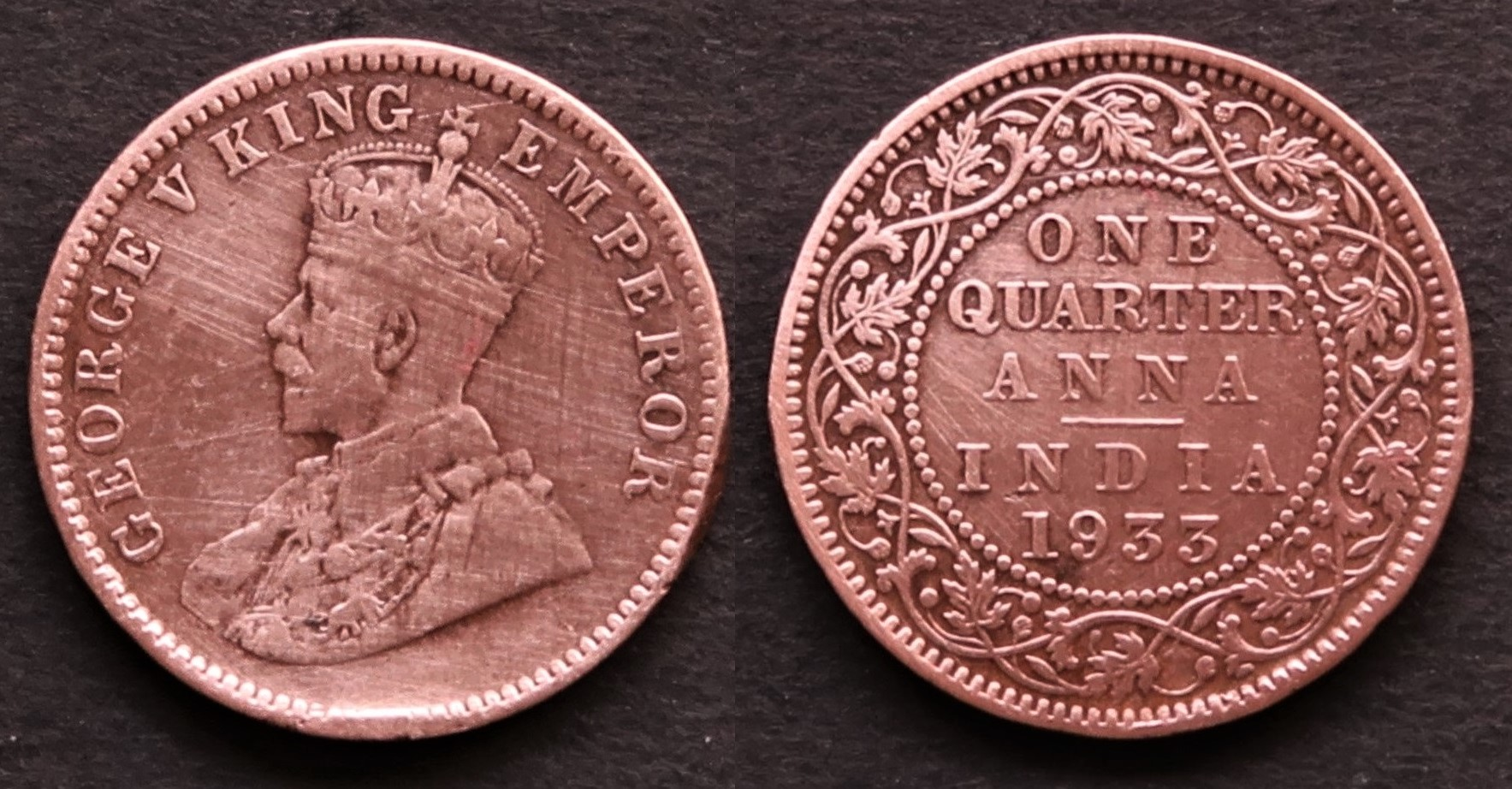
1933 One Quarter anna featuring George V on obverse and face value, country and year on reverse.

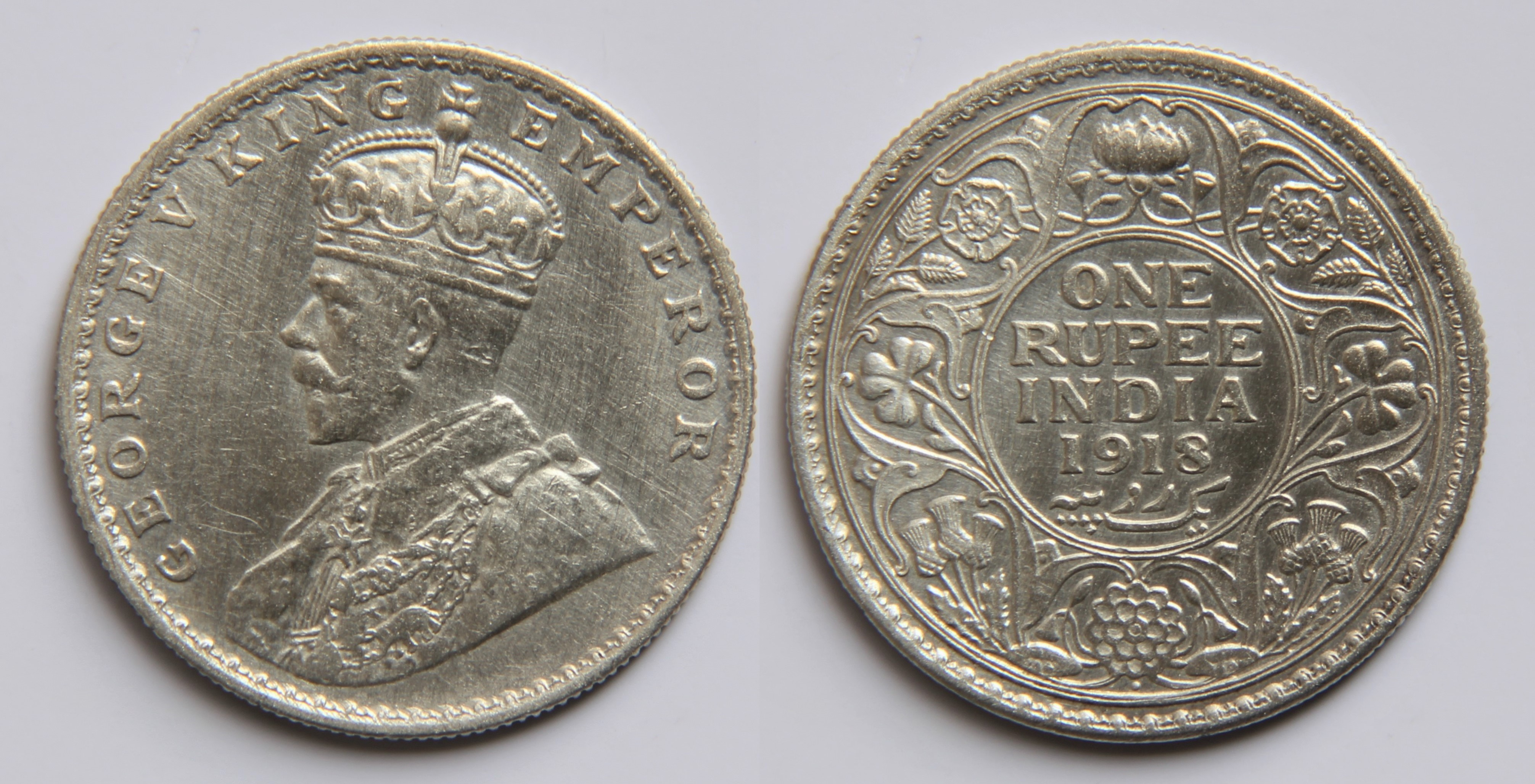
1918 Rupee featuring George V on obverse and face value, country and date on reverse.

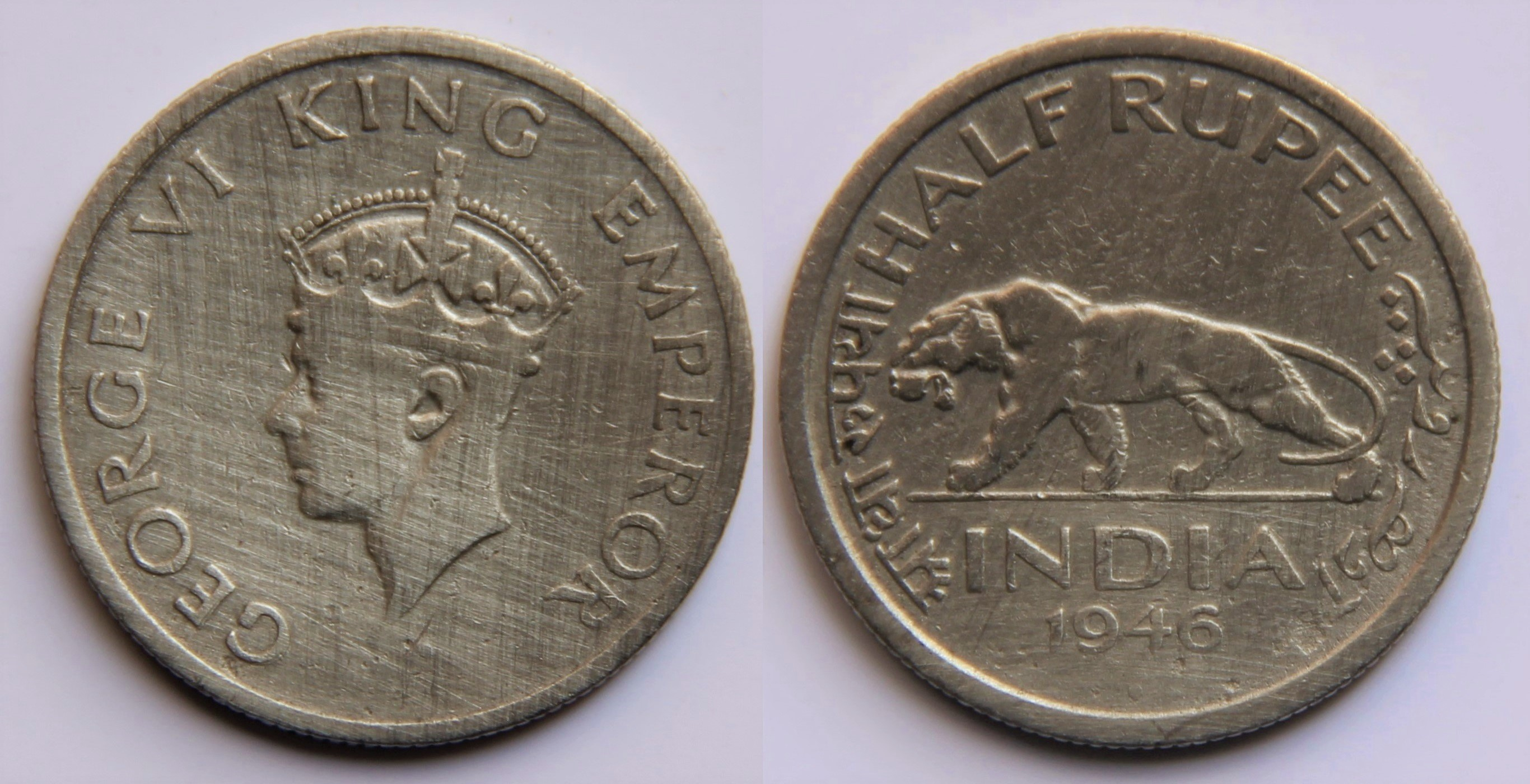
1946 half Rupee featuring George VI on obverse and Bengal tiger, year and country on reverse.

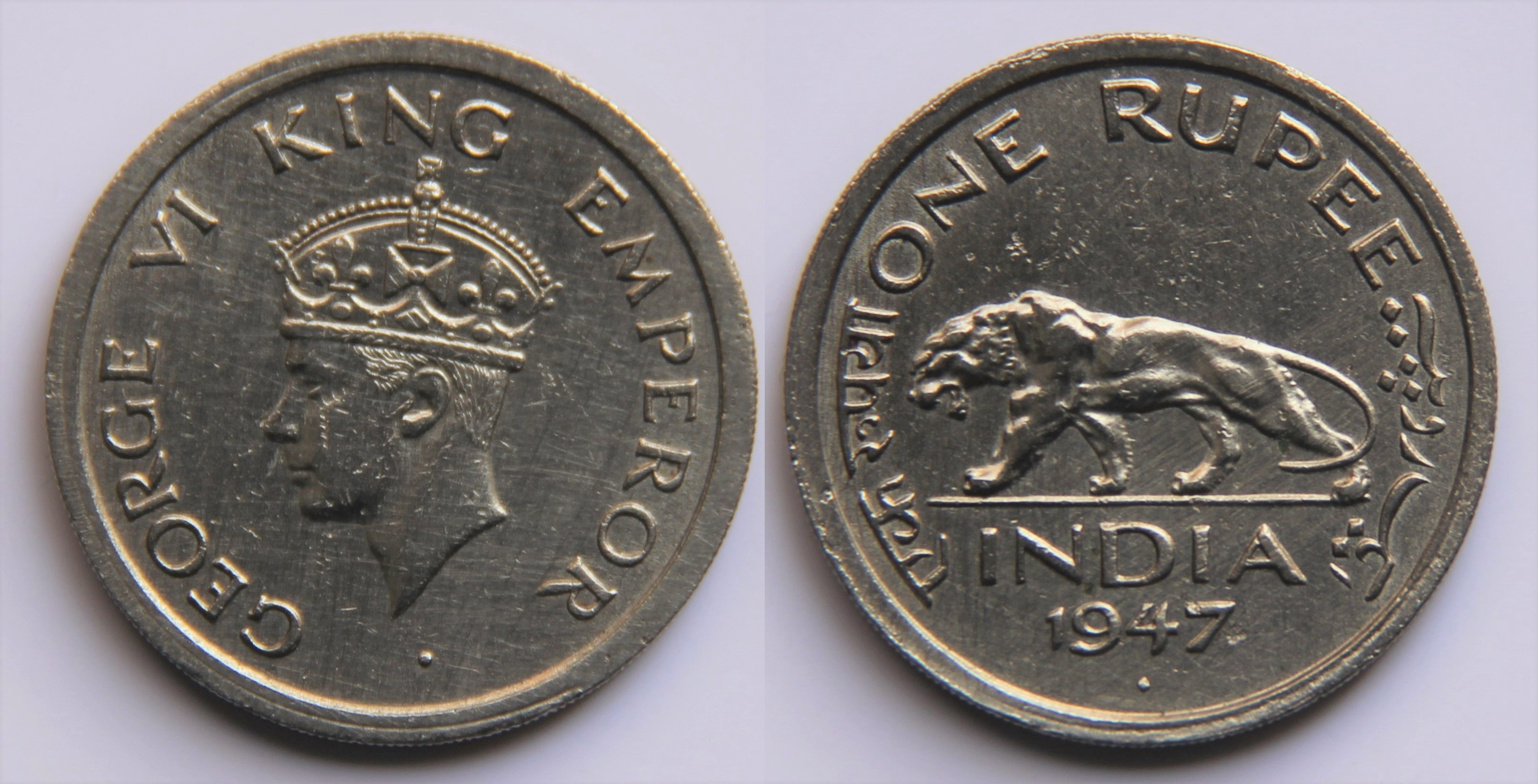
1947 Rupee featuring George VI on obverse and Bengal tiger, year and country on reverse.

== See also ==
- Indian rupee
- Indian coinage
- India Government Mint
- Kolkata Mint
