= Pie (monetary subunit) =

Unit of currency in British India

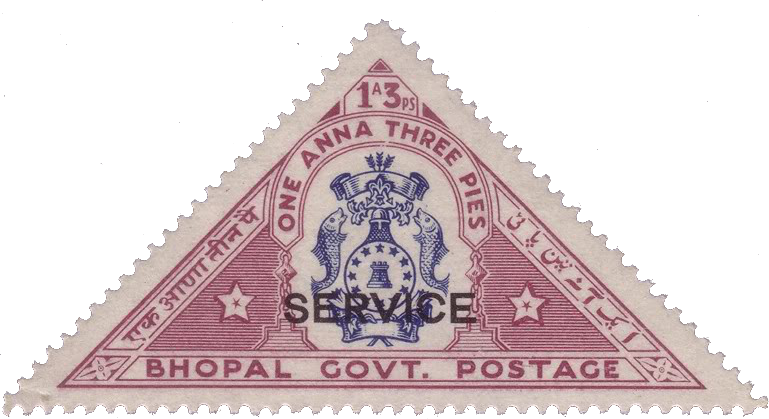
A Bhopal State postage stamp worth 1 anna and three pies

A pie (abbreviated as Ps) was a unit of currency in British India (now the independent nations of India, Burma, Pakistan and Bangladesh) until 1947. It was the smallest currency unit, equal to 1/3 of a pice, 1/12 of an anna or 1/192 of a rupee.

Unit	Value in pies
1 rupee	192
1 anna	12
1 paisa	3

== History ==
Shell currency had been used before coins became widespread, during the mid-nineteenth century, one pie was equivalent to about 12 cowry. The pie had been minted at Alipur, Calcutta but minting of the pie ended in 1942 the year before the Mint was shifted to Lahore, though it remained in circulation for a further five years. The British Indian government withdrew the pie from circulation in 1947 as it had become practically worthless due to inflation during WW2. (Note: Until 1966, India was a member of the sterling area, with the rupee pegged to the British pound sterling and having a value of 1s 6d, or 18 (old) pence; a pie was therefore worth 0.09 old pence or 3/8 of a farthing in 1947. In 1947, however, a single old penny had an estimated purchasing power of 14 new pence (in 2014 values). Therefore, a pie had a value of 1.3 pence in 2014. (Schedule of Par Values, Currencies of Metropolitan Areas, The Statesman's Year Book 1947, pg xxiii, Macmillan & Co.; measuringworth.com/ppoweruk/))

Pakistan, however, resumed minting the pie from 1951–1957, coins from 1951 were stuck in the name of King George VI, coins produced between 1952 and 1955 were struck in the name of Queen Elizabeth II while coins from 1956 and 1957 were struck in the name of the Islamic Republic of Pakistan. Pakistan's resumption of the pie was in part because the Pakistani rupee was valued higher than the Indian rupee from 1949 onwards, when India devalued its currency to maintain the exchange rate with the Pound Sterling. The pie was noted in official documents and legalisation during this time - for instance the Finance Act of 1957 notes the excise for motor spirit (i.e. petrol) being "One rupee, eight annas and nine pies Per Imperial gallon" - this was to be the rate until March 1958.

India demonetised all pie coins from 1 January 1959.

=== Postage ===
A 1949 stamp worth 9 pies from the Princely State of Bahawalpur

In 1854 postage stamps were introduced to British India, for a letter weighing 1/6 of a tola or less the cost was 6 pies, In 1866 postal rates were reduced (although not the minimum cost) so a letter weighing 1/4 of a tola or less cost 6 pies. In 1869 a letter weighing 1/2 of a tola or less cost 6 pies. Equivalent stamps were used in Princely States.

== Notation ==
Under the old currency system, each subunit of the Rupee was separated with a slash, the first number is the number of rupees, the second is the number of annas (1/16), the third is the number of pices (1/64), and the fourth is the number of pies (1/192). The table below shows four examples of currency notation and their decimal value:

Conversion of currency notation to Decimal Rupees
Notation	Rupees	Annas	Pices	Pies	Decimal value (Rs)
Rs 1/15/3/2	1	15	3	2	1.9947
Rs 1/8/3	1	8	3	—	1.546
Rs 1/4	1	4	—	—	1.25
Rs 1	1	—	—	—	1.00
