= Withdrawal of low-denomination coins =

Removal of low-denomination coins from production or circulation

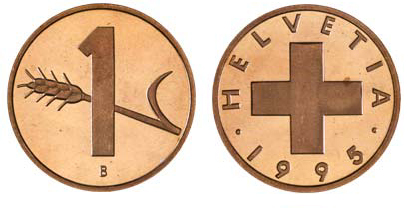
The Swiss 1 Rappen coin, last minted in 2006

The withdrawal of a country's lowest-denomination coins from circulation (usually a one-cent coin or equivalent) may either be through a decision to remove the coins from circulation, or simply through ceasing minting. This usually occurs after inflation or increased production costs for the coin. The coin being removed usually has a poor seigniorage, which means the coin costs as much if not more to produce than it is worth at face value.

== Reasons ==
This withdrawal may be due to the high cost of production, since the coin may be worth less than its cost of production. For example, Canada phased out its penny in 2012 at a production cost of 1.6 cents per penny, and the United States stopped minting its penny for circulation in 2025 at 3.69 cents per penny. Other reasons include low purchasing power and low utility. Often coins are withdrawn after their purchasing power has been eroded after decades of inflation. In Switzerland, the 1 Rappen coin had fallen into disuse by the early 1980s, but was still produced until 2006, albeit in ever decreasing quantities. Conversely, the British Treasury argued for the retention of the decimal halfpenny as late as 1983, on the grounds that its withdrawal would drive up inflation.

In some countries, such as New Zealand, withdrawn coins are declared to be no longer legal tender; in other countries, such as Australia, they remain legal tender indefinitely.

When the coin in question is no longer minted, cash transactions are rounded, typically through Swedish rounding.

Efforts have been made to end the routine use of pennies, and equivalents thereof, in several more countries, including the United States. In the U.S., pennies are no longer produced for circulation but continue to circulate. Businesses are permitted but not required to round cash transactions to the nearest five cents if pennies are unavailable at the time of transaction.

Countries in the eurozone have had different responses to the issue; according to James Debono writing for Malta Today, "scrapping the coins is considered unthinkable for Germany where both consumers and retailers are obsessed with precise pricing."

== Countries ==
Countries that have withdrawn or ended production of low-denomination coins, as well as some coins that were not the lowest denomination due to their cost of manufacture, include:

Country	Coin	Year of last minting	Withdrawal date	Legal tender?	Notes
Albania	5 qindarka	1988	1992	No	The 1 lek has not been officially withdrawn.
Albania	10 qindarka	1988	1992	No	The 1 lek has not been officially withdrawn.
Albania	20 qindarka	1988	1992	No	The 1 lek has not been officially withdrawn.
Albania	50 qindarka	1988	1992	No	The 1 lek has not been officially withdrawn.
Albania	1 Lek	2013	N/A	Yes	The 1 lek has not been officially withdrawn.
Albania	2 Lekë	1989	1992	No	The 1 lek has not been officially withdrawn.
Algeria	1 centime	1980s	1980s	No	
Algeria	2 centimes	1980s	1980s	No	
Algeria	5 centimes	1980s	1980s	No	
Algeria	10 centimes	1980s	1980s	No	
Algeria	20 centimes	1980s	1980s	No	
Algeria	50 centimes	1980s	1980s	No	
Algeria	1/4 dinars	2000	2000	Yes	
Algeria	1/2 dinars	2000	2000	Yes	
Argentina	1 centavo	2000	N/A	Yes	Not officially withdrawn.
Argentina	5 centavos	2011	N/A	Yes	Not officially withdrawn.
Argentina	10 centavos	2011	N/A	Yes	Not officially withdrawn.
Argentina	25 centavos	2010	N/A	Yes	Not officially withdrawn.
Argentina	50 centavos	2010	N/A	Yes	Not officially withdrawn.
Armenia	10 luma	2002	N/A	Yes	Not officially withdrawn.
Armenia	20 luma	2002	N/A	Yes	Not officially withdrawn.
Armenia	50 luma	2002	N/A	Yes	Not officially withdrawn.
Armenia	1 dram	2002	N/A	Yes	Not officially withdrawn.
Armenia	3 drams	2002	N/A	Yes	Not officially withdrawn.
Armenia	5 drams	2002	N/A	Yes	Not officially withdrawn.
Australia	1 cent	1991	1 February 1992	Yes	Legal tender for amounts not exceeding 20 cents; can be paid into bank accounts but sometimes refused.
Australia	2 cents	1991	1 February 1992	Yes	Legal tender for amounts not exceeding 20 cents; can be paid into bank accounts but sometimes refused.
Austria	1 groschen	1950	31 December 2001	No	As of 1 January 2002, with the introduction of the euro, the Austrian Schilling lost its function as a legal currency, but all legal tender coins at the time of the discontinuation of the Schilling are still convertible to Euros indefinitely.
Austria	2 groschen	1991	31 December 2001	No	As of 1 January 2002, with the introduction of the euro, the Austrian Schilling lost its function as a legal currency, but all legal tender coins at the time of the discontinuation of the Schilling are still convertible to Euros indefinitely.
Austria	5 groschen	1992	31 December 2001	No	As of 1 January 2002, with the introduction of the euro, the Austrian Schilling lost its function as a legal currency, but all legal tender coins at the time of the discontinuation of the Schilling are still convertible to Euros indefinitely.
Austria	20 groschen	1954	30 April 1959	No	As of 1 January 2002, with the introduction of the euro, the Austrian Schilling lost its function as a legal currency, but all legal tender coins at the time of the discontinuation of the Schilling are still convertible to Euros indefinitely.
Bahamas	1 cent	2015	2020	No	Production of the one-cent coin ended on 31 January 2020; one-cent coins remained as valid coins for use until 30 December 2020; were accepted for full redemption from the partner banks of the Central Bank of the Bahamas through 30 June 2021.
Bangladesh	1 poisha	2001	N/A	Yes	Legal tender for amounts not exceeding 50 poisha.
Bangladesh	5 poisha	2001	N/A	Yes	Legal tender for amounts not exceeding 50 poisha.
Bangladesh	10 poisha	2001	N/A	Yes	Legal tender for amounts not exceeding 50 poisha.
Bangladesh	25 poisha	2001	N/A	Yes	Legal tender for amounts not exceeding 50 poisha.
Bangladesh	50 poisha	2001	N/A	Yes	Legal tender for amounts not exceeding 50 poisha.
Belgium	1 centime	1914	7 May 1953	No	With the introduction of the euro on 1 January 2002, the 50-centime, 1-franc, 5-franc, 20-franc and 50-franc coins ceased to function as legal currencies; convertibility of coins ceased in December 2004.
Belgium	2 centimes	1919	7 May 1953	No	With the introduction of the euro on 1 January 2002, the 50-centime, 1-franc, 5-franc, 20-franc and 50-franc coins ceased to function as legal currencies; convertibility of coins ceased in December 2004.
Belgium	5 centimes	1943	1 January 1957	No	With the introduction of the euro on 1 January 2002, the 50-centime, 1-franc, 5-franc, 20-franc and 50-franc coins ceased to function as legal currencies; convertibility of coins ceased in December 2004.
Belgium	10 centimes	1946	1 January 1957	No	With the introduction of the euro on 1 January 2002, the 50-centime, 1-franc, 5-franc, 20-franc and 50-franc coins ceased to function as legal currencies; convertibility of coins ceased in December 2004.
Belgium	20 centimes	1963	26 November 1969	No	With the introduction of the euro on 1 January 2002, the 50-centime, 1-franc, 5-franc, 20-franc and 50-franc coins ceased to function as legal currencies; convertibility of coins ceased in December 2004.
Belgium	25 centimes	1975	4 July 1980	No	With the introduction of the euro on 1 January 2002, the 50-centime, 1-franc, 5-franc, 20-franc and 50-franc coins ceased to function as legal currencies; convertibility of coins ceased in December 2004.
Belgium	10 francs	1979	25 June 1985	No	With the introduction of the euro on 1 January 2002, the 50-centime, 1-franc, 5-franc, 20-franc and 50-franc coins ceased to function as legal currencies; convertibility of coins ceased in December 2004.
Brazil	1 centavo	2005	N/A	Yes	Not officially withdrawn.
Canada	1 cent	2012	4 February 2013	Yes	Cash transactions with sums ending in 1, 2, 6 or 7 cents are rounded down; those ending in 3, 4, 8 or 9 cents are rounded up. Non-cash transactions are still denominated to the cent.
Chile	1 centavo	1975	1979	No	1 and 5 peso coins ceased being produced in 2016 and were no longer legal tender on 1 November 2017; amounts are rounded to the nearest 10 pesos.
Chile	5 centavos	1976	1979	No	1 and 5 peso coins ceased being produced in 2016 and were no longer legal tender on 1 November 2017; amounts are rounded to the nearest 10 pesos.
Chile	10 centavos	1979	1984	No	1 and 5 peso coins ceased being produced in 2016 and were no longer legal tender on 1 November 2017; amounts are rounded to the nearest 10 pesos.
Chile	50 centavos	1979	1984	No	1 and 5 peso coins ceased being produced in 2016 and were no longer legal tender on 1 November 2017; amounts are rounded to the nearest 10 pesos.
Chile	1 peso	2016	1 November 2017	No	1 and 5 peso coins ceased being produced in 2016 and were no longer legal tender on 1 November 2017; amounts are rounded to the nearest 10 pesos.
Chile	5 pesos	2016	1 November 2017	No	1 and 5 peso coins ceased being produced in 2016 and were no longer legal tender on 1 November 2017; amounts are rounded to the nearest 10 pesos.
China	1 fen	2018	N/A	Yes	1, 2, and 5 fen coins have not been officially withdrawn. Amounts are rounded to the nearest 1 jiao (0.1 yuan or 10 fen).
China	2 fen	2000	N/A	Yes	1, 2, and 5 fen coins have not been officially withdrawn. Amounts are rounded to the nearest 1 jiao (0.1 yuan or 10 fen).
China	5 fen	2000	N/A	Yes	1, 2, and 5 fen coins have not been officially withdrawn. Amounts are rounded to the nearest 1 jiao (0.1 yuan or 10 fen).
China	2 jiao	1986	1 July 2000	No	1, 2, and 5 fen coins have not been officially withdrawn. Amounts are rounded to the nearest 1 jiao (0.1 yuan or 10 fen).
Colombia	1 centavo	1978	1978	No	Amounts are rounded to the nearest 50 pesos.
Colombia	5 centavos	1979	1979	No	Amounts are rounded to the nearest 50 pesos.
Colombia	10 centavos	1980	1983	No	Amounts are rounded to the nearest 50 pesos.
Colombia	20 centavos	1979	1983	No	Amounts are rounded to the nearest 50 pesos.
Colombia	50 centavos	1982	1983	No	Amounts are rounded to the nearest 50 pesos.
Colombia	1 peso	1985	1989	No	Amounts are rounded to the nearest 50 pesos.
Colombia	2 pesos	1988	1989	No	Amounts are rounded to the nearest 50 pesos.
Colombia	5 pesos	1993	1993	No	Amounts are rounded to the nearest 50 pesos.
Colombia	10 pesos	1994	2008	No	Amounts are rounded to the nearest 50 pesos.
Colombia	20 pesos	2008	2008	No	Amounts are rounded to the nearest 50 pesos.
Cook Islands	1 cent	1983	1993	No	Production of 1- and 2-cent coins ceased in 1983 and were demonetized in 1993; 5-cent coin demonetized on 30 April 2016, along with previous coin issues.
Cook Islands	2 cents	1983	1993	No	Production of 1- and 2-cent coins ceased in 1983 and were demonetized in 1993; 5-cent coin demonetized on 30 April 2016, along with previous coin issues.
Cook Islands	5 cents	1994	30 April 2016	No	Production of 1- and 2-cent coins ceased in 1983 and were demonetized in 1993; 5-cent coin demonetized on 30 April 2016, along with previous coin issues.
Costa Rica	5 céntimos	1979	1990	No	
Costa Rica	10 céntimos	1982	1990	No	
Costa Rica	25 céntimos	1989	1990	No	
Costa Rica	50 céntimos	1990	1990	No	
Costa Rica	1 colón	1998	1998	No	
Costa Rica	2 colones	1984	1998	No	
Costa Rica	5 colones	2016	2016	No	
Costa Rica	20 colones	1996	1996	No	
Croatia	1 lipa	2012	31 December 2022	No	From 2009 through 2022, 1 and 2 lipa coins were struck only as parts of the annual coin sets. With the introduction of the euro on 1 January 2023, the kuna ceased to be a legal tender currency.
Croatia	2 lipa	2012	31 December 2022	No	From 2009 through 2022, 1 and 2 lipa coins were struck only as parts of the annual coin sets. With the introduction of the euro on 1 January 2023, the kuna ceased to be a legal tender currency.
Cuba	1 centavo	2020	N/A	Yes	
Cuba	2 centavos	2010	N/A	Yes	
Cuba	5 centavos	2020	N/A	Yes	
Cuba	10 centavos	1961	13 March 1962	No	
Cuba	40 centavos	1998	July 2004	No	
Cyprus	1/2 cent	1 October 1992	1 December 2001	No	As of 1 January 2008, with the introduction of the euro, the Cypriot pound lost its function as a legal currency.
Czech Republic	10 haléřů	2003	31 October 2003	No	Exchangeable for five years from withdrawal, which ended in 2013.
Czech Republic	20 haléřů	2003	31 October 2003	No	Exchangeable for five years from withdrawal, which ended in 2013.
Czech Republic	50 haléřů	2008	31 August 2008	No	Exchangeable for five years from withdrawal, which ended in 2013.
Denmark	1 øre	1973	1 April 1973	No	Exchangeable at Danmarks Nationalbank for 3 years after withdrawal—now treated as scrap metal.
Denmark	2 øre	1973	1 April 1973	No	Exchangeable at Danmarks Nationalbank for 3 years after withdrawal—now treated as scrap metal.
Denmark	5 øre	1989	1 July 1989	No	Exchangeable at Danmarks Nationalbank for 3 years after withdrawal—now treated as scrap metal.
Denmark	10 øre	1989	1 July 1989	No	Exchangeable at Danmarks Nationalbank for 3 years after withdrawal—now treated as scrap metal.
Denmark	25 øre	2008	1 October 2008	No	Exchangeable at Danmarks Nationalbank for 3 years after withdrawal—now treated as scrap metal.
Dominican Republic	1 centavo	1989	1991	No	
Dominican Republic	5 centavos	1989	1991	No	
Dominican Republic	10 centavos	1991	2004	No	
Dominican Republic	25 centavos	1991	2004	No	
Dominican Republic	1/2 peso	1990	2004	No	
Egypt	5 piastres	2008	2008	Yes	
Egypt	10 piastres	2008	2008	Yes	
Egypt	20 piastres	2008	2008	Yes	
Estonia	5 senti	1 January 1997	2011	No	The 5 senti coin was discontinued in 1997, but remained legal tender. The 5 krooni coin was issued as a commemorative coin and thus rarely circulated. As of 1 January 2011, with the introduction of the euro, the Estonian kroon lost its function as a legal currency.
Estonia	5 krooni	1994	2011	No	The 5 senti coin was discontinued in 1997, but remained legal tender. The 5 krooni coin was issued as a commemorative coin and thus rarely circulated. As of 1 January 2011, with the introduction of the euro, the Estonian kroon lost its function as a legal currency.
Eurozone (select members)	1 and 2 cents	2002 (Finland)	2002 (Finland)	Yes	All cash purchases in noted member states are rounded to the nearest 5 cents. Non-cash transactions still denominated to the cent. 1 and 2 cent coins not officially withdrawn, still legal tender in said states, still legal tender in rest of Eurozone, and are still minted in small quantities for mint sets.
Eurozone (select members)	1 and 2 cents	2004 (Netherlands)	September 2004 (Netherlands)	Yes	All cash purchases in noted member states are rounded to the nearest 5 cents. Non-cash transactions still denominated to the cent. 1 and 2 cent coins not officially withdrawn, still legal tender in said states, still legal tender in rest of Eurozone, and are still minted in small quantities for mint sets.
Eurozone (select members)	1 and 2 cents	2015 (Ireland)	31 October 2015 (Ireland)	Yes	All cash purchases in noted member states are rounded to the nearest 5 cents. Non-cash transactions still denominated to the cent. 1 and 2 cent coins not officially withdrawn, still legal tender in said states, still legal tender in rest of Eurozone, and are still minted in small quantities for mint sets.
Eurozone (select members)	1 and 2 cents	2017 (Italy)	1 January 2018 (Italy)	Yes	All cash purchases in noted member states are rounded to the nearest 5 cents. Non-cash transactions still denominated to the cent. 1 and 2 cent coins not officially withdrawn, still legal tender in said states, still legal tender in rest of Eurozone, and are still minted in small quantities for mint sets.
Eurozone (select members)	1 and 2 cents	2019 (Belgium)	1 December 2019 (Belgium)	Yes	All cash purchases in noted member states are rounded to the nearest 5 cents. Non-cash transactions still denominated to the cent. 1 and 2 cent coins not officially withdrawn, still legal tender in said states, still legal tender in rest of Eurozone, and are still minted in small quantities for mint sets.
Eurozone (select members)	1 and 2 cents	2022 (Slovakia)	1 July 2022 (Slovakia)	Yes	All cash purchases in noted member states are rounded to the nearest 5 cents. Non-cash transactions still denominated to the cent. 1 and 2 cent coins not officially withdrawn, still legal tender in said states, still legal tender in rest of Eurozone, and are still minted in small quantities for mint sets.
Eurozone (select members)	1 and 2 cents	2024 (Estonia)	1 January 2025 (Estonia)	Yes	All cash purchases in noted member states are rounded to the nearest 5 cents. Non-cash transactions still denominated to the cent. 1 and 2 cent coins not officially withdrawn, still legal tender in said states, still legal tender in rest of Eurozone, and are still minted in small quantities for mint sets.
Fiji	1 cent	2006	13 November 2008	No	
Fiji	2 cents	2001	13 November 2008	No	
Finland	1 penni	1979	1979	No	As of 1 January 2002, with the introduction of the euro, the Finnish markka lost its function as a legal currency.
Finland	5 penniä	1990	1990	No	As of 1 January 2002, with the introduction of the euro, the Finnish markka lost its function as a legal currency.
Finland	20 penniä	1990	1990	No	As of 1 January 2002, with the introduction of the euro, the Finnish markka lost its function as a legal currency.
France	1 centime	1979	31 December 2001	No	The 1-centime coin fell out of use in the 1980s, but was still minted for annual coin sets from 1980 through 2001. As of 2002, the French franc is no longer a legal tender currency, but was still exchangeable for euros until 2012.
Georgia	1 tetri	1 January 2021	1 January 2021	No	1 and 2 tetri coins were discontinued as of 1 January 2021 and lost their status as legal tender. According to the new regulations on cash payments introduced by the National Bank of Georgia on 1 January 2019, 1 and 2 tetri are rounded to 0, and 3, 4, 6 and 7 tetri are rounded to 5.
Georgia	2 tetri	1 January 2021	1 January 2021	No	1 and 2 tetri coins were discontinued as of 1 January 2021 and lost their status as legal tender. According to the new regulations on cash payments introduced by the National Bank of Georgia on 1 January 2019, 1 and 2 tetri are rounded to 0, and 3, 4, 6 and 7 tetri are rounded to 5.
Greece	1 lepton	1879	1879	No	The 50 lepta, 1 drachma, and 2 drachma coins were rarely used but remained legal tender. As of 1 January 2002, with the introduction of the euro, the Greek drachma lost its function as a legal currency.
Greece	2 lepta	1878	1878	No	The 50 lepta, 1 drachma, and 2 drachma coins were rarely used but remained legal tender. As of 1 January 2002, with the introduction of the euro, the Greek drachma lost its function as a legal currency.
Greece	5 lepta	1971	1973	No	The 50 lepta, 1 drachma, and 2 drachma coins were rarely used but remained legal tender. As of 1 January 2002, with the introduction of the euro, the Greek drachma lost its function as a legal currency.
Greece	10 lepta	1978	1978	No	The 50 lepta, 1 drachma, and 2 drachma coins were rarely used but remained legal tender. As of 1 January 2002, with the introduction of the euro, the Greek drachma lost its function as a legal currency.
Greece	20 lepta	1978	1978	No	The 50 lepta, 1 drachma, and 2 drachma coins were rarely used but remained legal tender. As of 1 January 2002, with the introduction of the euro, the Greek drachma lost its function as a legal currency.
Greece	50 lepta	1986	2002	No	The 50 lepta, 1 drachma, and 2 drachma coins were rarely used but remained legal tender. As of 1 January 2002, with the introduction of the euro, the Greek drachma lost its function as a legal currency.
Greece	1 drachma	2000	2002	No	The 50 lepta, 1 drachma, and 2 drachma coins were rarely used but remained legal tender. As of 1 January 2002, with the introduction of the euro, the Greek drachma lost its function as a legal currency.
Greece	2 drachmes	2000	2002	No	The 50 lepta, 1 drachma, and 2 drachma coins were rarely used but remained legal tender. As of 1 January 2002, with the introduction of the euro, the Greek drachma lost its function as a legal currency.
Honduras	1 centavo	1998; 1974	1998	No	
Honduras	2 centavos	1998	1998	No	
Hong Kong	1 cent	1941	30 September 1995	No	Can be exchanged or paid into HSBC banks.
Hong Kong	5 cents	1980	1 January 1989	No	Can be exchanged or paid into HSBC banks.
Hungary	2 filler	1992	30 September 1992	No	Exchangeable at the Hungarian National Bank until 31 December 1993.
Hungary	5 filler	1992	30 September 1992	No	Exchangeable at the Hungarian National Bank until 31 December 1993.
Hungary	10 filler	1996	30 September 1996	No	Exchangeable until 31 December 1997.
Hungary	20 filler	1996	30 September 1996	No	Exchangeable until 31 December 1997.
Hungary	50 filler	1999	30 September 1999	No	Exchangeable until 30 September 2000.
Hungary	1 forint	2008	1 March 2008	No	Exchangeable for five years from the date of withdrawal.
Hungary	2 forint	2008	1 March 2008	No	Exchangeable for five years from the date of withdrawal.
Iceland	5 aurar	1985	1 October 2003	No	
Iceland	10 aurar	1990	1 October 2003	No	
Iceland	50 aurar	1990	1 October 2003	No	
India	1 paisa	1981	30 June 2011	No	On 30 June 2011, all coins in denominations of 25 paisa and below were officially demonetised.
India	2 paise	1979	30 June 2011	No	On 30 June 2011, all coins in denominations of 25 paisa and below were officially demonetised.
India	3 paise	1971	30 June 2011	No	On 30 June 2011, all coins in denominations of 25 paisa and below were officially demonetised.
India	5 paise	1994	30 June 2011	No	On 30 June 2011, all coins in denominations of 25 paisa and below were officially demonetised.
India	10 paise	1998	30 June 2011	No	On 30 June 2011, all coins in denominations of 25 paisa and below were officially demonetised.
India	20 paise	1997	30 June 2011	No	On 30 June 2011, all coins in denominations of 25 paisa and below were officially demonetised.
India	25 paise	2002	30 June 2011	No	On 30 June 2011, all coins in denominations of 25 paisa and below were officially demonetised.
India	50 paise	2016	N/A	Yes	On 30 June 2011, all coins in denominations of 25 paisa and below were officially demonetised.
Indonesia	1 rupiah	1970	N/A	Yes	
Indonesia	2 rupiah	1971	?	No	
Indonesia	5 rupiah	1979	15 November 1996	No	
Indonesia	10 rupiah	1979	15 November 1996	No	
Indonesia	25 rupiah	1996	31 August 2010	No	
Ireland	Halfpenny (decimal)	1986	1 January 1987	No	Irish pound coins were withdrawn in 2002 upon the introduction of the euro, but remain indefinitely convertible to euros at the Central Bank of Ireland.
Israel	1 agora	1990	1 January 2008	No	Exchangeable at the Bank of Israel and commercial banks for 3 years from withdrawal. Amounts are rounded to the nearest 10 agorot.
Israel	5 agorot	2007	1 January 2008	No	Exchangeable at the Bank of Israel and commercial banks for 3 years from withdrawal. Amounts are rounded to the nearest 10 agorot.
Italy	1 lira	1959	28 February 2002	No	The centesimo (below 1 lira) coins were withdrawn in 1947. 1- and 2-lire coins were minted from 1968 for collectors’ use only; 5-, 10-, and 20-lire coins fell out of use throughout the 1990s. All lira-denominated coins were withdrawn in 2002 with the introduction of the euro and exchangeable until 2011.
Italy	2 lire	1959	28 February 2002	No	The centesimo (below 1 lira) coins were withdrawn in 1947. 1- and 2-lire coins were minted from 1968 for collectors’ use only; 5-, 10-, and 20-lire coins fell out of use throughout the 1990s. All lira-denominated coins were withdrawn in 2002 with the introduction of the euro and exchangeable until 2011.
Italy	5 lire	2001	28 February 2002	No	The centesimo (below 1 lira) coins were withdrawn in 1947. 1- and 2-lire coins were minted from 1968 for collectors’ use only; 5-, 10-, and 20-lire coins fell out of use throughout the 1990s. All lira-denominated coins were withdrawn in 2002 with the introduction of the euro and exchangeable until 2011.
Italy	10 lire	2001	28 February 2002	No	The centesimo (below 1 lira) coins were withdrawn in 1947. 1- and 2-lire coins were minted from 1968 for collectors’ use only; 5-, 10-, and 20-lire coins fell out of use throughout the 1990s. All lira-denominated coins were withdrawn in 2002 with the introduction of the euro and exchangeable until 2011.
Italy	20 lire	2001	28 February 2002	No	The centesimo (below 1 lira) coins were withdrawn in 1947. 1- and 2-lire coins were minted from 1968 for collectors’ use only; 5-, 10-, and 20-lire coins fell out of use throughout the 1990s. All lira-denominated coins were withdrawn in 2002 with the introduction of the euro and exchangeable until 2011.
Jamaica	1 cent	2012	15 February 2018	No	
Jamaica	5 cents	1994	1994	No	
Jamaica	10 cents	2012	15 February 2018	No	
Jamaica	20 cents	1990	1990	No	
Jamaica	25 cents	2012	15 February 2018	No	
Jamaica	50 cents	1990	1990	No	
Japan	1 rin	1892	1953	No	All rin and sen coins were eventually demonetized at the end of 1953 when the Japanese government passed a law abolishing subsidiary coinage in favor of the yen.
Japan	5 rin	1919	1953	No	All rin and sen coins were eventually demonetized at the end of 1953 when the Japanese government passed a law abolishing subsidiary coinage in favor of the yen.
Japan	1/2 sen	1892	1953	No	All rin and sen coins were eventually demonetized at the end of 1953 when the Japanese government passed a law abolishing subsidiary coinage in favor of the yen.
Japan	1 sen	1945	1953	No	All rin and sen coins were eventually demonetized at the end of 1953 when the Japanese government passed a law abolishing subsidiary coinage in favor of the yen.
Japan	2 sen	1892	1953	No	All rin and sen coins were eventually demonetized at the end of 1953 when the Japanese government passed a law abolishing subsidiary coinage in favor of the yen.
Japan	5 sen	1946	1953	No	All rin and sen coins were eventually demonetized at the end of 1953 when the Japanese government passed a law abolishing subsidiary coinage in favor of the yen.
Japan	10 sen	1946	1953	No	All rin and sen coins were eventually demonetized at the end of 1953 when the Japanese government passed a law abolishing subsidiary coinage in favor of the yen.
Japan	20 sen	1948	1953	No	All rin and sen coins were eventually demonetized at the end of 1953 when the Japanese government passed a law abolishing subsidiary coinage in favor of the yen.
Japan	50 sen	1948	1953	No	All rin and sen coins were eventually demonetized at the end of 1953 when the Japanese government passed a law abolishing subsidiary coinage in favor of the yen.
Kazakhstan	2 tiyin	2001	31 December 2012	No	
Kazakhstan	5 tiyin	2001	31 December 2012	No	
Kazakhstan	10 tiyin	2001	31 December 2012	No	
Kazakhstan	20 tiyin	2001	31 December 2012	No	
Kazakhstan	50 tiyin	2001	31 December 2012	No	
Kenya	5 cents	1991	31 December 2011	No	
Kenya	10 cents	1994	31 December 2011	No	
Kenya	25 cents	1973	31 December 2011	No	
Kenya	50 cents	2009	N/A	Yes	
Kyrgyzstan	1 tyiyn	N/A	N/A	Yes	Not officially withdrawn; was minted in limited numbers as part of a new series of coins for general circulation for collectors.
Lebanon	1/2 piastre	1941	1941	No	
Lebanon	1 piastre	1955	1955	No	
Lebanon	2 1/2 piastres	1955	1955	No	
Lebanon	5 piastres	1975	1975	No	
Lebanon	10 piastres	1975	1975	No	
Lebanon	25 piastres	1980	1980	No	
Lebanon	50 piastres	1980	1980	No	
Lebanon	1 pound	1986	1986	No	
Malaysia	1 sen	2008	1 April 2008	Yes	
Mexico	5 centavos	2002	2002	Yes	Not officially withdrawn; minting of coin ceased.
Moldova	1 ban	2017	N/A	Yes	Not officially withdrawn; only the production of the coins was stopped.
Mongolia	1 möngö	1981	1992	No	
Mongolia	2 möngö	1981	1992	No	
Mongolia	5 möngö	1981	1992	No	
Mongolia	10 möngö	1981	1992	No	
Mongolia	15 möngö	1981	1992	No	
Mongolia	20 möngö	1981	1992	No	
Mongolia	50 möngö	1981	1992	No	
Morocco	1 santim	2001	N/A	Yes	Not officially withdrawn.
Morocco	5 santimat	2010	N/A	Yes	Not officially withdrawn.
Netherlands	1/2 cent	1948	1948	No	With the introduction of the euro on 1 January 2002, the 5-cent, 10-cent, 25-cent, 1-guilder, 2 1/2-guilder, and 5-guilder coins ceased to function as legal currencies and ceased to be convertible into euros in 2007.
Netherlands	1 cent	1983	1983	No	With the introduction of the euro on 1 January 2002, the 5-cent, 10-cent, 25-cent, 1-guilder, 2 1/2-guilder, and 5-guilder coins ceased to function as legal currencies and ceased to be convertible into euros in 2007.
Netherlands	2 1/2 cents	1948	1948	No	With the introduction of the euro on 1 January 2002, the 5-cent, 10-cent, 25-cent, 1-guilder, 2 1/2-guilder, and 5-guilder coins ceased to function as legal currencies and ceased to be convertible into euros in 2007.
Netherlands	1/2 guilder	1930	1930	No	With the introduction of the euro on 1 January 2002, the 5-cent, 10-cent, 25-cent, 1-guilder, 2 1/2-guilder, and 5-guilder coins ceased to function as legal currencies and ceased to be convertible into euros in 2007.
New Zealand	1 cent	1987	30 April 1990	No	Exchangeable at the Reserve Bank of New Zealand, but amounts over $5 must be paid into a New Zealand bank account.
New Zealand	2 cents	1987	30 April 1990	No	Exchangeable at the Reserve Bank of New Zealand, but amounts over $5 must be paid into a New Zealand bank account.
New Zealand	5 cents	2004	1 November 2006	No	Exchangeable at the Reserve Bank of New Zealand, but amounts over $5 must be paid into a New Zealand bank account.
Nigeria	1/2 kobo	2007	28 February 2007	No	1/2- to 25-kobo coins were withdrawn from circulation with effect from 28 February 2007.
Nigeria	1 kobo	2007	28 February 2007	No	1/2- to 25-kobo coins were withdrawn from circulation with effect from 28 February 2007.
Nigeria	5 kobo	2007	28 February 2007	No	1/2- to 25-kobo coins were withdrawn from circulation with effect from 28 February 2007.
Nigeria	10 kobo	2007	28 February 2007	No	1/2- to 25-kobo coins were withdrawn from circulation with effect from 28 February 2007.
Nigeria	25 kobo	2007	28 February 2007	No	1/2- to 25-kobo coins were withdrawn from circulation with effect from 28 February 2007.
North Macedonia	50 deni	1993	1 January 2013	No	Exchangeable at banks from 1 January to 31 March 2013; exchangeable only at the National Bank of North Macedonia thereafter.
Norway	1 øre	1972	1975	No	Norges Bank was obliged to redeem 50-øre coins until 2022.
Norway	2 øre	1972	1975	No	Norges Bank was obliged to redeem 50-øre coins until 2022.
Norway	5 øre	1992	1985	No	Norges Bank was obliged to redeem 50-øre coins until 2022.
Norway	10 øre	1992	1993	No	Norges Bank was obliged to redeem 50-øre coins until 2022.
Norway	25 øre	1985	1985	No	Norges Bank was obliged to redeem 50-øre coins until 2022.
Norway	50 øre	2012	1 May 2012	No	Norges Bank was obliged to redeem 50-øre coins until 2022.
Organisation of Eastern Caribbean States (OECS)	1 cent	2013	July 2015	No	1- and 2-cent coins were withdrawn from circulation from July 2015, and remained legal tender until 30 July 2020.
Organisation of Eastern Caribbean States (OECS)	2 cents	2011	July 2015	No	1- and 2-cent coins were withdrawn from circulation from July 2015, and remained legal tender until 30 July 2020.
Pakistan	1 paisa	1979	1 October 2014	No	On 1 October 2014, all coins in denominations of 50 paisa and below were officially demonetised.
Pakistan	2 paisa	1976	1 October 2014	No	On 1 October 2014, all coins in denominations of 50 paisa and below were officially demonetised.
Pakistan	5 paisa	1996	1 October 2014	No	On 1 October 2014, all coins in denominations of 50 paisa and below were officially demonetised.
Pakistan	10 paisa	1996	1 October 2014	No	On 1 October 2014, all coins in denominations of 50 paisa and below were officially demonetised.
Pakistan	25 paisa	1996	1 October 2014	No	On 1 October 2014, all coins in denominations of 50 paisa and below were officially demonetised.
Pakistan	50 paisa	1996	1 October 2014	No	On 1 October 2014, all coins in denominations of 50 paisa and below were officially demonetised.
Panama	1/2 centesimo	1907	1930	No	
Panama	1 1/4 centesimo	1940	1970	No	
Panama	2 1/2 centesimo	1976	1976	No	
Papua New Guinea	1 toea	2006	19 April 2007	No	
Papua New Guinea	2 toea	2006	19 April 2007	No	
Paraguay	1 céntimo	1950	1966	No	
Paraguay	5 céntimos	1947	1966	No	
Paraguay	10 céntimos	1953	1966	No	
Paraguay	15 céntimos	1953	1966	No	
Paraguay	25 céntimos	1953	1966	No	
Paraguay	50 céntimos	1953	1966	No	
Paraguay	1 guaraní	1993	17 January 2014	No	
Paraguay	5 guaraníes	1993	17 January 2014	No	
Paraguay	10 guaraníes	1996	17 January 2014	No	
Peru	1 céntimo	2010	1 January 2019	Yes	
Peru	5 céntimos	2018	1 January 2019	Yes	
Philippines	1/2 centavo	1908	1908	No	
Philippines	10 centavos	2017	N/A	Yes	Not officially withdrawn.
Philippines	20 centavos	2017	1945	No	
Philippines	50 centavos	1994	1998	No	
Philippines	2 pesos	1994	1998	No	
Portugal	1 centavo	1922	1922	No	With the introduction of the euro on 1 January 2002, the 1, 2.5, 5, 10, 20, 25, 50, 100, 200 escudo coins ceased to function as legal currencies.
Portugal	2 centavos	1921	1921	No	With the introduction of the euro on 1 January 2002, the 1, 2.5, 5, 10, 20, 25, 50, 100, 200 escudo coins ceased to function as legal currencies.
Portugal	4 centavos	1927	1919	No	With the introduction of the euro on 1 January 2002, the 1, 2.5, 5, 10, 20, 25, 50, 100, 200 escudo coins ceased to function as legal currencies.
Portugal	5 centavos	1927	1927	No	With the introduction of the euro on 1 January 2002, the 1, 2.5, 5, 10, 20, 25, 50, 100, 200 escudo coins ceased to function as legal currencies.
Portugal	10 centavos	1979	1979	No	With the introduction of the euro on 1 January 2002, the 1, 2.5, 5, 10, 20, 25, 50, 100, 200 escudo coins ceased to function as legal currencies.
Portugal	20 centavos	1974	1974	No	With the introduction of the euro on 1 January 2002, the 1, 2.5, 5, 10, 20, 25, 50, 100, 200 escudo coins ceased to function as legal currencies.
Portugal	50 centavos	1979	1979	No	With the introduction of the euro on 1 January 2002, the 1, 2.5, 5, 10, 20, 25, 50, 100, 200 escudo coins ceased to function as legal currencies.
Portugal	2.5 escudos	1985	2001	No	With the introduction of the euro on 1 January 2002, the 1, 2.5, 5, 10, 20, 25, 50, 100, 200 escudo coins ceased to function as legal currencies.
Portugal	25 escudos	1986	2001	No	With the introduction of the euro on 1 January 2002, the 1, 2.5, 5, 10, 20, 25, 50, 100, 200 escudo coins ceased to function as legal currencies.
Russia	1 kopeck	2014	N/A	Yes	Not officially withdrawn. Have been produced in limited quantities for mint sets since 2024.
Russia	5 kopecks	2014	N/A	Yes	Not officially withdrawn. Have been produced in limited quantities for mint sets since 2024.
Russia	10 kopecks	2015	N/A	Yes	Not officially withdrawn. Have been produced in limited quantities for mint sets since 2024.
Russia	50 kopecks	2015	N/A	Yes	Not officially withdrawn. Have been produced in limited quantities for mint sets since 2024.
Samoa	1 sene	1996	2011	No	
Samoa	2 sene	1996	2011	No	
Samoa	5 sene	2010	2011	No	
Serbia	1 para	1994	1 May 2003	No	The Serbian dinar replaced the Yugoslav dinar in 2003.
Serbia	5 para	1996	1 May 2003	No	The Serbian dinar replaced the Yugoslav dinar in 2003.
Serbia	10 para	1998	1 May 2003	No	The Serbian dinar replaced the Yugoslav dinar in 2003.
Serbia	50 para	2007	1 January 2008	No	The Serbian dinar replaced the Yugoslav dinar in 2003.
Singapore	1 cent	2002	N/A	Yes	Not officially withdrawn.
Slovakia	10 halierov	2003	31 December 2003	No	As of 1 January 2009, with the introduction of the euro, the Slovak koruna lost its function as a legal currency.
Slovakia	20 halierov	2003	31 December 2003	No	As of 1 January 2009, with the introduction of the euro, the Slovak koruna lost its function as a legal currency.
Slovenia	10 stotinov	2006	31 December 2006	No	As of 1 January 2007, with the introduction of the euro, the Slovenian tolar lost its function as a legal currency.
Slovenia	20 stotinov	2006	31 December 2006	No	As of 1 January 2007, with the introduction of the euro, the Slovenian tolar lost its function as a legal currency.
Solomon Islands	1 cent	2010	2012	No	
Solomon Islands	2 cents	2010	2012	No	
Solomon Islands	5 cents	2010	2012	No	
South Africa	1 cent	2002	1 April 2002	Yes	
South Africa	2 cents	2002	1 April 2002	Yes	
South Africa	5 cents	2012	1 April 2012	Yes	
South Korea	1 won	1991	N/A	Yes	1- and 5-won coins have not been officially withdrawn and have been produced in limited quantities for the Bank of Korea's official annual coin sets since 1992. Amounts are rounded to the nearest 10 won.
South Korea	5 won	1991	N/A	Yes	1- and 5-won coins have not been officially withdrawn and have been produced in limited quantities for the Bank of Korea's official annual coin sets since 1992. Amounts are rounded to the nearest 10 won.
Spain	1 céntimo	1913	1913	No	The céntimo coins lost their legal tender status in 1983. With the introduction of the euro on 1 January 2002, the 1, 2, 5, 10, 25, 50, 100, 200, and 500 peseta coins lost their legal tender status.
Spain	2 céntimos	1912	1912	No	The céntimo coins lost their legal tender status in 1983. With the introduction of the euro on 1 January 2002, the 1, 2, 5, 10, 25, 50, 100, 200, and 500 peseta coins lost their legal tender status.
Spain	5 céntimos	1953	1953	No	The céntimo coins lost their legal tender status in 1983. With the introduction of the euro on 1 January 2002, the 1, 2, 5, 10, 25, 50, 100, 200, and 500 peseta coins lost their legal tender status.
Spain	10 céntimos	1959	1959	No	The céntimo coins lost their legal tender status in 1983. With the introduction of the euro on 1 January 2002, the 1, 2, 5, 10, 25, 50, 100, 200, and 500 peseta coins lost their legal tender status.
Spain	20 céntimos	1870	1870	No	The céntimo coins lost their legal tender status in 1983. With the introduction of the euro on 1 January 2002, the 1, 2, 5, 10, 25, 50, 100, 200, and 500 peseta coins lost their legal tender status.
Spain	25 céntimos	1937	1937	No	The céntimo coins lost their legal tender status in 1983. With the introduction of the euro on 1 January 2002, the 1, 2, 5, 10, 25, 50, 100, 200, and 500 peseta coins lost their legal tender status.
Spain	50 céntimos	1983	1983	No	The céntimo coins lost their legal tender status in 1983. With the introduction of the euro on 1 January 2002, the 1, 2, 5, 10, 25, 50, 100, 200, and 500 peseta coins lost their legal tender status.
Spain	2 pesetas	1984	2001	No	The céntimo coins lost their legal tender status in 1983. With the introduction of the euro on 1 January 2002, the 1, 2, 5, 10, 25, 50, 100, 200, and 500 peseta coins lost their legal tender status.
Sri Lanka	1 cent	1994	N/A	Yes	Not officially withdrawn.
Sri Lanka	2 cents	1978	N/A	Yes	Not officially withdrawn.
Sri Lanka	5 cents	1991	N/A	Yes	Not officially withdrawn.
Sri Lanka	10 cents	1991	N/A	Yes	Not officially withdrawn.
Sri Lanka	25 cents	2009	N/A	Yes	Not officially withdrawn.
Sri Lanka	50 cents	2009	N/A	Yes	Not officially withdrawn.
Sweden	1 öre	1971	30 June 1972	No	Payable into bank accounts for several months after withdrawal; now treated as scrap metal.
Sweden	2 öre	1971	30 June 1972	No	Payable into bank accounts for several months after withdrawal; now treated as scrap metal.
Sweden	5 öre	1984	30 June 1985	No	Payable into bank accounts for several months after withdrawal; now treated as scrap metal.
Sweden	25 öre	1984	30 June 1985	No	Payable into bank accounts for several months after withdrawal; now treated as scrap metal.
Sweden	10 öre	1991	30 September 1992	No	Payable into bank accounts for several months after withdrawal; now treated as scrap metal.
Sweden	50 öre	2009	30 September 2010	No	Payable into bank accounts for several months after withdrawal; now treated as scrap metal.
Switzerland	1 Rappen	2006	1 January 2007	No	Exchangeable at the Swiss National Bank for 20 years after withdrawal.
Switzerland	2 Rappen	1974	1978	No	Exchangeable at the Swiss National Bank for 20 years after withdrawal.
Taiwan	10 cents	1981	N/A	Yes	Not officially withdrawn.
Taiwan	20 cents	1981	N/A	Yes	Not officially withdrawn.
Taiwan	50 cents	2004	N/A	Yes	Not officially withdrawn.
Tajikistan	1 diram	2011	N/A	Yes	Not officially withdrawn; was minted in limited numbers as part of a new series of coins for general circulation for collectors.
Tajikistan	2 diram	2011	N/A	Yes	Not officially withdrawn; was minted in limited numbers as part of a new series of coins for general circulation for collectors.
Tajikistan	5 diram	2019	N/A	Yes	Not officially withdrawn; was minted in limited numbers as part of a new series of coins for general circulation for collectors.
Tajikistan	25 diram	2006	N/A	Yes	Not officially withdrawn; was minted in limited numbers as part of a new series of coins for general circulation for collectors.
Tanzania	5 cents	1984	1984	No	
Tanzania	10 cents	1984	1984	No	
Tanzania	20 cents	1984	1984	No	
Tanzania	50 cents	1990	1990	No	
Tanzania	1 shilling	1992	1992	No	
Tanzania	5 shillings	1993	1993	No	
Tanzania	10 shillings	1993	1993	No	
Tanzania	20 shillings	1992	1992	No	
Thailand	1 satang	N/A	N/A	Yes	Not officially withdrawn; used only in transactions between domestic banks.
Thailand	5 satang	N/A	N/A	Yes	Not officially withdrawn; used only in transactions between domestic banks.
Thailand	10 satang	N/A	N/A	Yes	Not officially withdrawn; used only in transactions between domestic banks.
Tonga	1 seniti	2005	1 October 2015	No	Amounts are rounded to the nearest 5 or 10 seniti.
Tonga	2 seniti	2005	1 October 2015	No	Amounts are rounded to the nearest 5 or 10 seniti.
Trinidad and Tobago	1 cent	2014	2018	No	Production ceased in 2014 and lost its validity in 2018; exchangeable at the Central Bank of Trinidad and Tobago.
Tunisia	1 millim	1990	N/A	Yes	Not officially withdrawn.
Tunisia	2 millims	1983	N/A	Yes	Not officially withdrawn.
Turkey	10 old para (0.25 old kuruş)	1950	1950	No	Following the redenomination that took effect on 1 January 2005, 1,000,000 old lira was replaced with 1 new lira.
Turkey	1/2 old kuruş (0.5 old kuruş)	1965	1965	No	Following the redenomination that took effect on 1 January 2005, 1,000,000 old lira was replaced with 1 new lira.
Turkey	1 old kuruş	1989	1989	No	Following the redenomination that took effect on 1 January 2005, 1,000,000 old lira was replaced with 1 new lira.
Turkey	2 1/2 old kuruş	1965	1965	No	Following the redenomination that took effect on 1 January 2005, 1,000,000 old lira was replaced with 1 new lira.
Turkey	5, 10, 25 and 50 kuruş	1989	1989	No	Following the redenomination that took effect on 1 January 2005, 1,000,000 old lira was replaced with 1 new lira.
Turkey	1 old lira	1990	1990	No	Following the redenomination that took effect on 1 January 2005, 1,000,000 old lira was replaced with 1 new lira.
Turkey	2 1/2 old lira	1989	1989	No	Following the redenomination that took effect on 1 January 2005, 1,000,000 old lira was replaced with 1 new lira.
Turkey	5 old lira	1990	1990	No	Following the redenomination that took effect on 1 January 2005, 1,000,000 old lira was replaced with 1 new lira.
Turkey	10 old lira	1990	1990	No	Following the redenomination that took effect on 1 January 2005, 1,000,000 old lira was replaced with 1 new lira.
Turkey	20 old lira	1990	1990	No	Following the redenomination that took effect on 1 January 2005, 1,000,000 old lira was replaced with 1 new lira.
Turkey	25 old lira	1990	1990	No	Following the redenomination that took effect on 1 January 2005, 1,000,000 old lira was replaced with 1 new lira.
Turkey	50 old lira	1995	1995	No	Following the redenomination that took effect on 1 January 2005, 1,000,000 old lira was replaced with 1 new lira.
Turkey	100 old lira	1995	1995	No	Following the redenomination that took effect on 1 January 2005, 1,000,000 old lira was replaced with 1 new lira.
Turkey	500 old lira	1998	1998	No	Following the redenomination that took effect on 1 January 2005, 1,000,000 old lira was replaced with 1 new lira.
Turkey	1,000 old lira	1998	1998	No	Following the redenomination that took effect on 1 January 2005, 1,000,000 old lira was replaced with 1 new lira.
Turkey	2,500 old lira	1998	1998	No	Following the redenomination that took effect on 1 January 2005, 1,000,000 old lira was replaced with 1 new lira.
Turkey	5,000 old lira	2000	1 February 2001	No	Following the redenomination that took effect on 1 January 2005, 1,000,000 old lira was replaced with 1 new lira.
Turkey	10,000 old lira	2000	15 December 2001	No	Following the redenomination that took effect on 1 January 2005, 1,000,000 old lira was replaced with 1 new lira.
Turkey	25,000 old lira	2003	23 February 2004	No	Following the redenomination that took effect on 1 January 2005, 1,000,000 old lira was replaced with 1 new lira.
Turkey	50,000 old lira	2004	31 December 2005	No	Following the redenomination that took effect on 1 January 2005, 1,000,000 old lira was replaced with 1 new lira.
Turkey	100,000 old lira	2004	31 December 2005	No	Following the redenomination that took effect on 1 January 2005, 1,000,000 old lira was replaced with 1 new lira.
Turkey	250,000 old lira	2004	31 December 2005	No	Following the redenomination that took effect on 1 January 2005, 1,000,000 old lira was replaced with 1 new lira.
Uganda	1 shilling	1987	N/A	Yes	Not officially withdrawn.
Uganda	2 shillings	1987	N/A	Yes	Not officially withdrawn.
Uganda	5 shillings	1987	N/A	Yes	Not officially withdrawn.
Uganda	10 shillings	1987	N/A	Yes	Not officially withdrawn.
Uganda	50 shillings	2015	N/A	Yes	Not officially withdrawn.
Ukraine	1 kopiyka	2016	1 October 2019	No	Exchangeable for 3 years after withdrawal. Amounts are rounded to the nearest 10 kopiyok (₴0.10).
Ukraine	2 kopiyky	2014	1 October 2019	No	Exchangeable for 3 years after withdrawal. Amounts are rounded to the nearest 10 kopiyok (₴0.10).
Ukraine	5 kopiyok	2015	1 October 2019	No	Exchangeable for 3 years after withdrawal. Amounts are rounded to the nearest 10 kopiyok (₴0.10).
Ukraine	10 kopiyok	2022	1 October 2025	Yes	Exchangeable for 3 years after withdrawal. Amounts are rounded to the nearest 10 kopiyok (₴0.10).
Ukraine	25 kopiyok	2016	1 October 2020	No	Exchangeable for 3 years after withdrawal. Amounts are rounded to the nearest 10 kopiyok (₴0.10).
United Arab Emirates	1 fils	2005	N/A	Yes	Not officially withdrawn.
United Arab Emirates	5 fils	2014	N/A	Yes	Not officially withdrawn.
United Arab Emirates	10 fils	2018	N/A	Yes	Not officially withdrawn.
United Kingdom	Half farthing (1/8 d)	1856	1870	No	Decimal halfpennies can be paid into bank accounts at the discretion of commercial banks; they cannot be exchanged by the general public at the Royal Mint, although private companies exist which can do so.
United Kingdom	farthing (1/4 d)	1956	1960	No	Decimal halfpennies can be paid into bank accounts at the discretion of commercial banks; they cannot be exchanged by the general public at the Royal Mint, although private companies exist which can do so.
United Kingdom	ha'penny (1/2 d, £1/480)	1967	15 February 1971	No	Decimal halfpennies can be paid into bank accounts at the discretion of commercial banks; they cannot be exchanged by the general public at the Royal Mint, although private companies exist which can do so.
United Kingdom	Penny (old) (1d, £1/240)	1970	15 February 1971	No	Decimal halfpennies can be paid into bank accounts at the discretion of commercial banks; they cannot be exchanged by the general public at the Royal Mint, although private companies exist which can do so.
United Kingdom	Threepence (3d or 1 1/4p, £1/80)	1970	31 August 1971	No	Decimal halfpennies can be paid into bank accounts at the discretion of commercial banks; they cannot be exchanged by the general public at the Royal Mint, although private companies exist which can do so.
United Kingdom	1/2 penny (£1/200)	1984	31 December 1984	No	Decimal halfpennies can be paid into bank accounts at the discretion of commercial banks; they cannot be exchanged by the general public at the Royal Mint, although private companies exist which can do so.
United Kingdom	Sixpence (6d or 2 1/2p, £1/40)	1970	30 June 1980	No	Decimal halfpennies can be paid into bank accounts at the discretion of commercial banks; they cannot be exchanged by the general public at the Royal Mint, although private companies exist which can do so.
United Kingdom	Shilling (1/– or 5p, £1/20)	1970	31 July 1990	No	The shilling and florin remained legal tender after decimalisation with respective values of 5p and 10p, the same fraction of £1 as before. The new coins of those values had the same dimensions. New decimal coins with smaller dimensions were introduced in the early 1990s and the old designs, along with the pre-decimal coins, withdrawn shortly afterwards.
United Kingdom	Five pence	1989	31 July 1990	No	The shilling and florin remained legal tender after decimalisation with respective values of 5p and 10p, the same fraction of £1 as before. The new coins of those values had the same dimensions. New decimal coins with smaller dimensions were introduced in the early 1990s and the old designs, along with the pre-decimal coins, withdrawn shortly afterwards.
United Kingdom	Florin (2/– or 10p, £1/10)	1970	30 June 1993	No	The shilling and florin remained legal tender after decimalisation with respective values of 5p and 10p, the same fraction of £1 as before. The new coins of those values had the same dimensions. New decimal coins with smaller dimensions were introduced in the early 1990s and the old designs, along with the pre-decimal coins, withdrawn shortly afterwards.
United Kingdom	Ten pence	1989	30 June 1993	No	The shilling and florin remained legal tender after decimalisation with respective values of 5p and 10p, the same fraction of £1 as before. The new coins of those values had the same dimensions. New decimal coins with smaller dimensions were introduced in the early 1990s and the old designs, along with the pre-decimal coins, withdrawn shortly afterwards.
United States	1/2 cent	1857	21 February 1857	Yes	All US coinage, pursuant to the Coinage Act of 1965, is legal tender for any amount. Currency can only be eliminated through an act of Congress. 1 cent coin not officially withdrawn; minting of coin for circulation halted. Cash payments may be rounded to the nearest five cents if pennies are unavailable, but this is not a requirement.
United States	1 cent	2025	N/A	Yes	All US coinage, pursuant to the Coinage Act of 1965, is legal tender for any amount. Currency can only be eliminated through an act of Congress. 1 cent coin not officially withdrawn; minting of coin for circulation halted. Cash payments may be rounded to the nearest five cents if pennies are unavailable, but this is not a requirement.
United States	2 cents	1872	1873	Yes	All US coinage, pursuant to the Coinage Act of 1965, is legal tender for any amount. Currency can only be eliminated through an act of Congress. 1 cent coin not officially withdrawn; minting of coin for circulation halted. Cash payments may be rounded to the nearest five cents if pennies are unavailable, but this is not a requirement.
United States	3 cents	1873	1889	Yes	All US coinage, pursuant to the Coinage Act of 1965, is legal tender for any amount. Currency can only be eliminated through an act of Congress. 1 cent coin not officially withdrawn; minting of coin for circulation halted. Cash payments may be rounded to the nearest five cents if pennies are unavailable, but this is not a requirement.
United States	20 cents	1878	2 May 1878	Yes	All US coinage, pursuant to the Coinage Act of 1965, is legal tender for any amount. Currency can only be eliminated through an act of Congress. 1 cent coin not officially withdrawn; minting of coin for circulation halted. Cash payments may be rounded to the nearest five cents if pennies are unavailable, but this is not a requirement.
Uruguay	10 centésimos	1994	2005	No	
Uruguay	20 centésimos	1994	2005	No	
Uruguay	50 centésimos	2008	1 July 2010	No	
Uzbekistan	1 tiyin	1994	1 March 2020	No	
Uzbekistan	3 tiyin	1994	1 March 2020	No	
Uzbekistan	5 tiyin	1994	1 March 2020	No	
Uzbekistan	10 tiyin	1994	1 March 2020	No	
Uzbekistan	20 tiyin	1994	1 March 2020	No	
Uzbekistan	50 tiyin	1994	1 March 2020	No	
Uzbekistan	1 sum	2000	1 March 2020	No	
Uzbekistan	5 sum	2001	1 March 2020	No	
Uzbekistan	10 sum	2001	1 March 2020	No	
Vanuatu	1 vatu	2011	31 March 2011	No	
Vanuatu	2 vatu	2011	31 March 2011	No	
Vietnam	200 đồng	2003	April 2011	Yes	Not officially withdrawn.
Vietnam	500 đồng	2004	April 2011	Yes	Not officially withdrawn.
Vietnam	1,000 đồng	2003	April 2011	Yes	Not officially withdrawn.
Vietnam	2,000 đồng	2004	April 2011	Yes	Not officially withdrawn.
Vietnam	5,000 đồng	2003	April 2011	Yes	Not officially withdrawn.
Zambia	1 old ngwee	1983	1 January 2013	No	Following the redenomination that took effect on 1 January 2013, 1,000 old kwacha was replaced by 1 new kwacha.
Zambia	2 old ngwee	1983	1 January 2013	No	Following the redenomination that took effect on 1 January 2013, 1,000 old kwacha was replaced by 1 new kwacha.
Zambia	5 old ngwee	1987	1 January 2013	No	Following the redenomination that took effect on 1 January 2013, 1,000 old kwacha was replaced by 1 new kwacha.
Zambia	10 old ngwee	1987	1 January 2013	No	Following the redenomination that took effect on 1 January 2013, 1,000 old kwacha was replaced by 1 new kwacha.
Zambia	20 old ngwee	1988	1 January 2013	No	Following the redenomination that took effect on 1 January 2013, 1,000 old kwacha was replaced by 1 new kwacha.
Zambia	25 old ngwee	1992	1 January 2013	No	Following the redenomination that took effect on 1 January 2013, 1,000 old kwacha was replaced by 1 new kwacha.
Zambia	50 old ngwee	1992	1 January 2013	No	Following the redenomination that took effect on 1 January 2013, 1,000 old kwacha was replaced by 1 new kwacha.
Zambia	25 old ngwee	1992	1 January 2013	No	Following the redenomination that took effect on 1 January 2013, 1,000 old kwacha was replaced by 1 new kwacha.
Zambia	50 old ngwee	1992	1 January 2013	No	Following the redenomination that took effect on 1 January 2013, 1,000 old kwacha was replaced by 1 new kwacha.
Zambia	1 old kwacha	1992	1 January 2013	No	Following the redenomination that took effect on 1 January 2013, 1,000 old kwacha was replaced by 1 new kwacha.
Zambia	5 old kwacha	1992	1 January 2013	No	Following the redenomination that took effect on 1 January 2013, 1,000 old kwacha was replaced by 1 new kwacha.
Zambia	10 old kwacha	1992	1 January 2013	No	Following the redenomination that took effect on 1 January 2013, 1,000 old kwacha was replaced by 1 new kwacha.

== See also ==
- Cent (currency)
- Penny
- Legal tender § Demonetization
