= British half penny =

British halfpenny may refer to:

- Halfpenny (British pre-decimal coin)
- Halfpenny (British decimal coin)
