= Reményi =

Reményi is a Hungarian surname. Notable people with the surname include:

- Ede Reményi (1828–1898), Hungarian violinist and composer
- József Reményi (1887–1977), Hungarian sculptor, medallist, and coin designer
- Lajos Reményi-Schneller (1892–1946), Hungarian politician
