= Coins of the Hungarian forint =

Overview of the history of coins of the Hungarian forint

Hungarian forint coins (Hungarian: forint érmék) are part of the physical form of current Hungarian currency, the Hungarian forint. Modern forint coins (distinguished from pre-20th century forint coinage) have been struck since 1946 and reflect the changes of post-World War II Hungarian history.

== 2nd Republic issues (1946–1948) ==
After the trauma of the Second World War and the hyperinflation of the pengő, the Hungarian government faced the problems of introducing a new currency. The new coins were meant to express stability and raise popular confidence. The first coins minted in 1946 were made of copper alloys for fillér coins and aluminium for 1 & 2 forint coins. The new forint was based on a gold standard, and in the first two years 5 forint coins of good quality silver were put into circulation. However, the government feared hoarding of these coins, and the national bank lowered the mass and quality of silver in the 1947 minting. The silver 5 forint coins were halted for general circulation after 1947. Aluminium 5 and 50 fillér coins were first minted in 1948.

The first commemoratives were a series of 3 coins in 1948 honoring the centennial of the 1848 revolution.

2nd Republic issues - regular
Value	Technical parameters				Description			Date of			
Value	Diameter	Thickness	Mass	Composition	Edge	Obverse	Reverse	first minting	issue	withdrawal	lapse
2 f	17.0 mm	1.7 mm	3.0 g	Brass; 85% copper 15% zinc	Smooth	"MAGYAR ÁLLAMI VÁLTÓPÉNZ" ^{1}, year of minting, "Kossuth" coat of arms	Value, mintmark	1946	1 November 1946	30 June 1977	31 December 1977
5 f	17.0 mm	1.4 mm	0.6 g	Aluminium	Smooth	"MAGYAR KÖZTÁRSASÁG" ^{2}, year of minting, young female model	Value, mintmark	1948	30 January 1948	30 September 1992	31 December 1993
10 f	19.1 mm	1.5 mm	3.0 g	Aluminium bronze 92% copper 8% aluminium	Milled	"MAGYAR ÁLLAMI VÁLTÓPÉNZ", year of minting, Dove carrying an olive branch	Value, mintmark	1946	1 November 1946	30 June 1977	31 December 1977
20 f	21.0 mm	1.6 mm	4.0 g	Aluminium bronze 92% copper 8% aluminium	Milled	"MAGYAR ÁLLAMI VÁLTÓPÉNZ", year of minting, 3 ears of wheat	Value, mintmark	1946	1 November 1946	30 June 1977	31 December 1977
50 f	22.0 mm	1.6 mm	1.4 g	Aluminium	Smooth	"MAGYAR KÖZTÁRSASÁG", year of minting, man sitting on an anvil with a hammer	Value, mintmark	1948	5 May 1948	30 June 1972	30 June 1973
1 Ft	23.7 mm	1.6 mm	1.5 g	Aluminium	Milled	"MAGYAR ÁLLAMI VÁLTÓPÉNZ", mintmark, "Kossuth" coat of arms	Value, year of minting	1946	1 November 1946	31 August 1951	31 March 1952
2 Ft	28.0 mm	2.0 mm	2.8 g	Aluminium	Milled	"MAGYAR KÖZTÁRSASÁG", mintmark, "Kossuth" coat of arms	Value, year of minting	1946	1 November 1946	31 December 1951	31 December 1952
5 Ft	32.0 mm	2.9 mm	20.0 g	835‰ silver	"MUNKA A NEMZETI JÓLÉT ALAPJA" ^{3}	"MAGYAR KÖZTÁRSASÁG", mintmark, year of minting, value, "Kossuth" coat of arms	"1802-1894 KOSSUTH", Lajos Kossuth	1946	1 November 1946	30 June 1977	31 December 1977
5 Ft	32.0 mm	1.9 mm	12.0 g	500‰ silver	"M Á P V" ^{4} and ornaments	"MAGYAR KÖZTÁRSASÁG", mintmark, year of minting, value, "Kossuth" coat of arms	"1802-1894 KOSSUTH", Lajos Kossuth	1947	19 May 1947	30 June 1977	31 December 1977
2nd Republic issues - circulating commemorative
5 Ft	32.0 mm	1.9 mm	12.0 g	500‰ silver	"ESKÜSZÜNK ESKÜSZÜNK" ^{5}	"MAGYAR KÖZTÁRSASÁG", value, year of minting, mintmark	"PETŐFI SÁNDOR 1848-49", Sándor Petőfi	1948	1 May 1948	30 June 1977	31 December 1977
10 Ft	36.0 mm	2.5 mm	20.0 g	500‰ silver	"A LEGNAGYOBB MAGYAR EMLÉKÉRE" ^{6}	"MAGYAR KÖZTÁRSASÁG", value, year of minting, mintmark	"SZÉCHENYI ISTVÁN 1848-49", István Széchenyi	1948	1 May 1948	30 June 1977	31 December 1977
20 Ft	40.0 mm	2.8 mm	28.0 g	500‰ silver	Ornament	"MAGYAR KÖZTÁRSASÁG", value, year of minting, mintmark, "Kossuth" coat of arms	"TÁNCSICS MIHÁLY 1848", Mihály Táncsics	1948	1 May 1948	30 June 1977	31 December 1977

== People's Republic issues (1949–1989) ==
In 1949 the communist party took full power. The country's name was changed to Hungarian People's Republic (Magyar Népköztársaság), which appeared on the coins. The Kossuth coat of arms was replaced with the Rákosi one (see: coat of arms of Hungary). The 2, 10 and 20 fillér coins were made of aluminium after 1950.

Following the Hungarian Revolution of 1956 the coat of arms was changed again, with the new version used from 1957 to 1989.

People's Republic issues - regular
Image		Value	Technical parameters				Description			Date of			
Obverse	Reverse	Value	Diameter	Thickness	Mass	Composition	Edge	Obverse	Reverse	first minting	issue	withdrawal	lapse
		2 f	18.0 mm	1.1 mm	0.65 g	Aluminium	Smooth	"MAGYAR NÉPKÖZTÁRSASÁG" ^{7}, year of minting	Value, mintmark	1950	27 March 1950	30 September 1992	31 December 1993
		5 f	17.0 mm	1.4 mm	0.6 g	Aluminium	Smooth	"MAGYAR NÉPKÖZTÁRSASÁG", year of minting, young female model	Value, mintmark	1953	31 March 1953	30 September 1992	31 December 1993
		10 f	19.1 mm	1.4 mm	0.85 g	Aluminium	Milled	"MAGYAR NÉPKÖZTÁRSASÁG", year of minting, Dove carrying an olive branch	Value, mintmark	1950	15 December 1950	30 September 1996	31 December 1997
		10 f	18.5 mm	1.2 mm	0.6 g	96% aluminium 4% magnesium	Smooth	"MAGYAR NÉPKÖZTÁRSASÁG", year of minting, Dove carrying an olive branch	Value, mintmark	1967	12 May 1967	30 September 1996	31 December 1997
		20 f	21.0 mm	1.6 mm	1.25 g	Aluminium	Smooth	"MAGYAR NÉPKÖZTÁRSASÁG", year of minting, 3 ears of wheat	Value, mintmark	1953	31 March 1953	30 September 1996	31 December 1997
		20 f	20.4 mm	1.4 mm	0.9 g	96% aluminium 4% magnesium	Milled	"MAGYAR NÉPKÖZTÁRSASÁG", year of minting, 3 ears of wheat	Value, mintmark	1967	12 May 1967	30 September 1996	31 December 1997
		50 f	22.0 mm	1.6 mm	1.4 g	Aluminium	Smooth	"MAGYAR NÉPKÖZTÁRSASÁG", year of minting, man sitting on an anvil with a hammer	Value, mintmark	1953	31 March 1953	30 June 1972	30 June 1973
		50 f	21.5 mm	1.6 mm	1.2 g	96% aluminium 4% magnesium	Smooth	"MAGYAR NÉPKÖZTÁRSASÁG", Erzsébet Bridge	Value, year of minting, mintmark	1967	12 May 1967	30 September 1999	30 September 2000
		1 Ft	23.7 mm	1.6 mm	1.5 g	Aluminium	Milled	"MAGYAR NÉPKÖZTÁRSASÁG", year of minting, "Rákosi" coat of arms	Value, mintmark	1949	15 November 1949	30 June 1995	31 December 1995
		1 Ft	23.7 mm	1.6 mm	1.5 g	Aluminium	Milled	"MAGYAR NÉPKÖZTÁRSASÁG", year of minting, "Kádár" coat of arms	Value, mintmark	1957	10 October 1957	30 June 1995	31 December 1995
		1 Ft	22.8 mm	1.8 mm	1.4 g	96% aluminium 4% magnesium	Milled	"MAGYAR NÉPKÖZTÁRSASÁG", year of minting, "Kádár" coat of arms	Value, mintmark	1967	12 May 1967	30 June 1995	31 December 1995
		2 Ft	25.0 mm	1.4 mm	5.0 g	Cupronickel; 75% copper 25% nickel	Ornaments	"MAGYAR NÉPKÖZTÁRSASÁG", year of minting, "Rákosi" coat of arms	Value, mintmark	1950	20 January 1950	30 June 1971	30 June 1972
		2 Ft	25.0 mm	1.4 mm	5.0 g	Cupronickel; 75% copper 25% nickel	Ornaments	"MAGYAR NÉPKÖZTÁRSASÁG", year of minting, "Kádár" coat of arms	Value, mintmark	1957	10 October 1957	30 June 1971	30 June 1972
		2 Ft	25.0 mm	1.4 mm	5.0 g	58% copper 18% nickel 24% zinc	Ornaments	"MAGYAR NÉPKÖZTÁRSASÁG", year of minting, "Kádár" coat of arms	Value, mintmark	1962	9 December 1962	30 June 1971	30 June 1972
		2 Ft	22.4 mm	1.6 mm	4.44 g	Brass; 72% copper 28% zinc	Smooth	"MAGYAR NÉPKÖZTÁRSASÁG", "Kádár" coat of arms	Value, year of minting, mintmark	1970	1 July 1970	30 June 1995	31 December 1995
		5 Ft	27.5 mm	1.7 mm	7.4 g	60% copper 21% nickel 19% zinc	Milled	"MAGYAR NÉPKÖZTÁRSASÁG", mintmark, year of minting, value, "Kádár" coat of arms	"1802-1894 KOSSUTH", Lajos Kossuth	1967	12 May 1967	30 June 1972	30 June 1973
		5 Ft	24.3 mm	1.7 mm	5.73 g	Nickel	Milled	"MAGYAR NÉPKÖZTÁRSASÁG" "KOSSUTH", Lajos Kossuth	Value, mintmark, year of minting, "Kádár" coat of arms	1971	2 August 1971	30 June 1995	31 December 1995
		5 Ft	23.4 mm	1.6 mm	5.0 g	Cupronickel; 75% copper 25% nickel	Milled	"MAGYAR NÉPKÖZTÁRSASÁG" "KOSSUTH", Lajos Kossuth	Value, mintmark, year of minting, "Kádár" coat of arms	1983	18 April 1983	30 June 1995	31 December 1995
		10 Ft	28.0 mm	1.9 mm	8.83 g	Nickel	Ornaments	"MAGYAR NÉPKÖZTÁRSASÁG", mintmark, the Liberty Statue in Budapest	Value, year of minting, "Kádár" coat of arms	1971	1 June 1971	31 March 1987	31 December 1988
		10 Ft	25.4 mm	1.7 mm	6.1 g	92% copper 6% aluminium 2% nickel	Ornaments	"MAGYAR NÉPKÖZTÁRSASÁG", mintmark, the Liberty Statue in Budapest	Value, year of minting, "Kádár" coat of arms	1983	18 April 1983	30 June 1995	31 December 1995
		20 Ft	26.8 mm	1.8 mm	7.06 g	Cupronickel; 75% copper 25% nickel	Milled	"MAGYAR NÉPKÖZTÁRSASÁG", György Dózsa	Value, year of minting, mintmark, "Kádár" coat of arms	1982	18 April 1983	30 June 1995	31 December 1995
People's Republic issues - circulating commemorative
		20 f	20.4 mm	1.4 mm	0.9 g	96% Aluminium; 4% Magnesium	Milled	"MAGYAR NÉPKÖZTÁRSASÁG", year of minting, 3 ears of wheat, TERMELJ TÖBB ÉLELMET	Value, mintmark	1983	28 March 1983	Current	
		5 Ft	23.4 mm	1.6 mm	5.0 g	75% Copper; 25% Nickel	Milled	MAGYAR NÉPKÖZTÁRSASÁG, corncob (Zea mays), logo of FAO	Value, mintmark, year of minting, "Kádár" coat of arms	1983	28 March 1983	Current	
		10 Ft	28.0 mm	1.9 mm	8.83 g	100% Nickel	Ornaments	MAGYAR NÉPKÖZTÁRSASÁG, mintmark, the Liberty Statue in Budapest	Value, year of minting, logo of FAO	1981	30 April 1981	Current	
		10 Ft	28.0 mm	1.9 mm	8.83 g	100% Nickel	Ornaments	MAGYAR NÉPKÖZTÁRSASÁG, mintmark, man cutting bread, logo of FAO	Value, year of minting, "Kádár" coat of arms	1983	28 March 1983	Current	
These images are to scale at 2.5 pixels per millimetre. For table standards, see the coin specification table.

== 3rd Republic issues (1989–2011) ==
In 1992, after the fall of the communist government, a new series of coins was introduced in denominations of 1, 2, 5, 10, 20, 50 and 100 forint . Production of 2 and 5 fillér coins ceased in 1992, with all fillér coins withdrawn from circulation by 1999. From 1996, a bimetallic 100 forint coin was minted to replace the 1992 version, which was considered too big and ugly and easily confused with the 20 forint coin. The 200 forint coin was made of .500 fine silver until 1994, when the price of the metal rose higher than the coin's face value. However, small issues for collectors were minted until 1998, when both the 1992 type 100 and 200 forint coins were withdrawn from circulation.

The 1 and 2 Forint coins were withdrawn from circulation on March 1, 2008, as announced in September 2007, as the cost of minting them was four times their face value. When paying with cash, the total is to be rounded to the nearest 5 forints. The 200 forint note was replaced with a new 200 forint coin on 15 June 2009, decorated with the Chain Bridge, as chosen in an internet poll in October 2008.

Reportedly, large numbers of 1 forint coins were illegally used in Canada in place of subway tokens, a highly profitable trade until the machines were reprogrammed. The 50 forint coin is confused with the UK 50 pence coin by some British vending machines.

3rd Republic issues - regular
Image		Value	Technical parameters				Description			Date of			
Obverse	Reverse	Value	Diameter	Thickness	Mass	Composition	Edge	Obverse	Reverse	first minting	issue	withdrawal	lapse
		2 f	18.0 mm	1.1 mm	0.65 g	Aluminium	Smooth	"MAGYAR KÖZTÁRSASÁG", year of minting	Value, mintmark	1990	1 April 1990	30 September 1992	31 December 1993
		5 f	17.0 mm	1.4 mm	0.6 g	Aluminium	Smooth	"MAGYAR KÖZTÁRSASÁG", year of minting, young female model	Value, mintmark	1990	1 April 1990	30 September 1992	31 December 1993
		10 f	18.5 mm	1.2 mm	0.6 g	96% aluminium 4% magnesium	Smooth	"MAGYAR KÖZTÁRSASÁG", year of minting, Dove carrying an olive branch	Value, mintmark	1990	1 April 1990	30 September 1996	31 December 1997
		20 f	20.4 mm	1.4 mm	0.9 g	96% aluminium 4% magnesium	Milled	"MAGYAR KÖZTÁRSASÁG", year of minting, 3 ears of wheat	Value, mintmark	1990	1 April 1990	30 September 1996	31 December 1997
		50 f	21.5 mm	1.6 mm	1.2 g	96% aluminium 4% magnesium	Smooth	"MAGYAR KÖZTÁRSASÁG", Erzsébet Bridge	Value, year of minting, mintmark	1990	1 April 1990	30 September 1999	30 September 2000
		1 Ft	16.3 mm	1.1 mm	2.05 g	75% copper 21% zinc 4% nickel	Smooth	"MAGYAR KÖZTÁRSASÁG", year of minting, coat of arms	Value, mintmark	1992	29 March 1993	1 March 2008	1 March 2013
		2 Ft	19.2 mm	1.5 mm	3.1 g	Cupronickel; 75% copper 25% nickel	Milled	"MAGYAR KÖZTÁRSASÁG", year of minting, Hungarian crocus (Colchicum hungaricum)	Value, mintmark	1992	29 March 1993	1 March 2008	1 March 2013
		5 Ft	21.2 mm	1.3 mm	4.2 g	75% copper 21% zinc 4% nickel	Smooth	"MAGYAR KÖZTÁRSASÁG", year of minting, great egret (Egretta alba)	Value, mintmark	1992	21 June 1993	Current	
		10 Ft	24.8 mm	1.3 mm	6.1 g	Cupronickel; 75% copper 25% nickel	Alternately smooth and milled	"MAGYAR KÖZTÁRSASÁG", year of minting, coat of arms	Value, mintmark	1992	21 June 1993	Current	
		20 Ft	26.3 mm	1.9 mm	6.9 g	75% copper 21% zinc 4% nickel	Milled	"MAGYAR KÖZTÁRSASÁG", year of minting, stool iris (Iris aphylla)	Value, mintmark	1992	29 March 1993	Current	
		50 Ft	27.4 mm	1.7 mm	7.7 g	Cupronickel; 75% copper 25% nickel	Smooth	"MAGYAR KÖZTÁRSASÁG", year of minting, sitting saker falcon (Falco cherrug)	Value, mintmark	1992	21 June 1993	Current	
		100 Ft	29.2 mm	1.9 mm	9.4 g	75% copper 21% zinc 4% nickel	Ornaments	"MAGYAR KÖZTÁRSASÁG", year of minting, coat of arms	Value, mintmark	1992	21 June 1993	31 December 1998	31 December 1999
		100 Ft	23.8 mm	2.2 mm	8 g	Steel; Ring: Ni plated Center: 75% Cu; 25% Zn plated	Milled	"MAGYAR KÖZTÁRSASÁG", year of minting, coat of arms	Value, mintmark	1996	21 October 1996	Current	
		200 Ft	32 mm	1.7 mm	12 g	500‰ silver	Milled	"MAGYAR KÖZTÁRSASÁG", year of minting, value, mintmark, the Széchenyi Chain Bridge, coat of arms	The building of the Hungarian National Bank, signatures of its governor and four vice-governors	1992	1 December 1992	3 April 1998	3 April 1999
		200 Ft	32 mm	1.7 mm	12 g	500‰ silver	Milled	"MAGYAR KÖZTÁRSASÁG", year of minting, value, mintmark, the Széchenyi Chain Bridge, coat of arms	Portrait of Ferenc Deák	1994	29 April 1994	3 April 1998	3 April 1999
		200 Ft	28.3 mm	2.0 mm	9.0 g	Bimetallic	Interrupted milled	"MAGYAR KÖZTÁRSASÁG", year of minting, Széchenyi Chain Bridge	Value, mintmark	2009	15 June 2009	Current	
3rd Republic - Circulating commemorative
		10 Ft	24.8 mm	1.3 mm	6.1 g	cupronickel 75% copper 25% nickel	Alternately smooth and milled	MAGYAR KÖZTÁRSASÁG, JÓZSEF ATTILA, 1905 1937, Attila József, year of minting	Value, mintmark	2005	11 April 2005	Current	
		20 Ft	26.3 mm	1.9 mm	6.9 g	75% copper 21% zinc 4% nickel	Milled	MAGYAR KÖZTÁRSASÁG, DEÁK FERENC, 1803 1876, Ferenc Deák, year of minting	Value, mintmark	2003	8 April 2003	Current	
		50 Ft	27.4 mm	1.7 mm	7.7 g	cupronickel 75% copper 25% nickel	Smooth	MAGYAR KÖZTÁRSASÁG, AZ EURÓPAI UNIÓ TAGJA, coat of arms, a circle of stars representing the European Union with minting year inside	Value, mintmark	2004	30 April 2004	Current	
		50 Ft	27.4 mm	1.7 mm	7.7 g	cupronickel 75% copper 25% nickel	Smooth	MAGYAR KÖZTÁRSASÁG, 15 ÉVES A NEMZETKÖZI GYERMEKMENTŐ SZOLGÁLAT, logo of the International Children's Safety Service, year of minting	Value, mintmark	2005	9 October 2005	Current	
		50 Ft	27.4 mm	1.7 mm	7.7 g	cupronickel 75% copper 25% nickel	Smooth	MAGYAR KÖZTÁRSASÁG, 125 ÉV, logo of the Hungarian Red Cross, year of minting	Value, mintmark	2006	19 September 2006	Current	
		50 Ft	27.4 mm	1.7 mm	7.7 g	cupronickel 75% copper 25% nickel	Smooth	MAGYAR KÖZTÁRSASÁG, 1956, the Parliament with the hollow flag of the 1956 revolution, year of minting	Value, mintmark	2006	20 September 2006	Current	
		50 Ft	27.4 mm	1.7 mm	7.7 g	cupronickel 75% copper 25% nickel	Smooth	MAGYAR KÖZTÁRSASÁG, 50 ÉVES A RÓMAI SZERZŐDÉS, EURÓPA, the Treaty of Rome, paving design of Piazza Del Campidoglio in Rome, year of minting	Value, mintmark	2007	25 March 2007	Current	
		100 Ft	23,8 mm	2,2 mm	8,0 g	100% Steel; Ring: Nickel plated Center: 75% Copper; 25% Zinc plated	Milled	MAGYAR KÖZTÁRSASÁG, KOSSUTH, 1802-1894, Lajos Kossuth, year of minting	Value, mintmark	2002	1 February 2002	Current	
These images are to scale at 2.5 pixels per millimetre. For table standards, see the coin specification table.

== "Hungary" issues (2012–present) ==
According to Hungary's new constitution, effective as of 1 January 2012, the country's official name changes from "Magyar Köztársaság" (Hungarian Republic) to "Magyarország" (Hungary). Although Hungary is still a republic, this does not appear anymore on its coinage: from 2012 Hungarian legal tender will bear the country's new official name, "Magyarország". Previously struck coins remained legal tender and in circulation.

5, 10, and 20 forint coins are expected to appear in everyday circulation in 2012, with the rest of denominations following later, fulfilling the needs of Hungary's cash circulation. The official 2012 boxed set became available for collectors on 6 January 2012.

"Hungary" issues - regular
Image		Value	Technical parameters				Description			Date of			
Obverse	Reverse	Value	Diameter	Thickness	Mass	Composition	Edge	Obverse	Reverse	first minting	issue	with- drawal	lapse
		5 Ft	21.2 mm	1.3 mm	4.2 g	75% copper 21% zinc 4% nickel	Smooth	"MAGYARORSZÁG", year of minting, great egret (Egretta alba)	Value, mintmark	2012	6 January 2012	Current	
		10 Ft	24.8 mm	1.3 mm	6.1 g	Cupronickel; 75% copper 25% nickel	Alternately smooth and milled	"MAGYARORSZÁG", year of minting, coat of arms	Value, mintmark	2012	6 January 2012	Current	
		20 Ft	26.3 mm	1.9 mm	6.9 g	75% copper 21% zinc 4% nickel	Milled	"MAGYARORSZÁG", year of minting, stool iris (Iris aphylla)	Value, mintmark	2012	6 January 2012	Current	
		50 Ft	27.4 mm	1.7 mm	7.7 g	Cupronickel; 75% copper 25% nickel	Smooth	"MAGYARORSZÁG", year of minting, sitting saker falcon (Falco cherrug)	Value, mintmark	2012	6 January 2012	Current	
		100 Ft	23.8 mm	2.2 mm	8 g	Steel; Ring: Ni plated Center: 75% Cu; 25% Zn plated	Milled	"MAGYARORSZÁG", year of minting, coat of arms	Value, mintmark	2012	6 January 2012	Current	
		200 Ft	28.3 mm	2.0 mm	9.0 g	Bimetallic	Interrupted milled	"MAGYARORSZÁG", year of minting, Széchenyi Chain Bridge	Value, mintmark	2012	6 January 2012	Current	
"Hungary" issues - commemorative
		3,000 Ft	34 mm		20 g	925‰ silver	Milled	MAGYARORSZÁG, mintmark, year of minting, value, Imre Madách	MADÁCH IMRE, engraver's mark, Adam and Eve standing on the Earth globe, AZ EMBER TRAGÉDIÁJA	2012	12 January 2012	Current	
		5,000 Ft	38.61 mm		31.46 g	925‰ silver	Milled	MAGYARORSZÁG, value, mintmark, year of minting, female figure by József Reményi	REMÉNYI JÓZSEF - 1887 - 1977, József Reményi, engraver's initials, "Euro-star" identifying the coin as part of the "Europe Series"	2012	23 January 2012	Current	
These images are to scale at 2.5 pixels per millimetre. For table standards, see the coin specification table.

== Remarks ==
1. "MAGYAR ÁLLAMI VÁLTÓPÉNZ" = "Hungarian state token coin" - váltópénz literally means "small change"; here it stands to express that the metal of which the coin is made is worth less than the face value of the coin itself
2. "MAGYAR KÖZTÁRSASÁG" = "Hungarian Republic"
3. "MUNKA A NEMZETI JÓLÉT ALAPJA" = "Labour is the ground of national welfare"
4. "M Á P V" = "Magyar Állami Pénzverde" = "Hungarian State Mint"
5. "ESKÜSZÜNK ESKÜSZÜNK" = "We vow, we vow" (from the refrain of the Nemzeti dal by Sándor Petőfi)
6. "A LEGNAGYOBB MAGYAR EMLÉKÉRE" = "To commemorate the greatest Hungarian" (Lajos Kossuth designated István Széchenyi as such)
7. "MAGYAR NÉPKÖZTÁRSASÁG" = "Hungarian People's Republic"
