= Penny =

Unit of currency in various countries

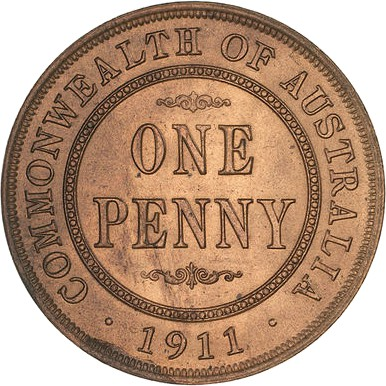
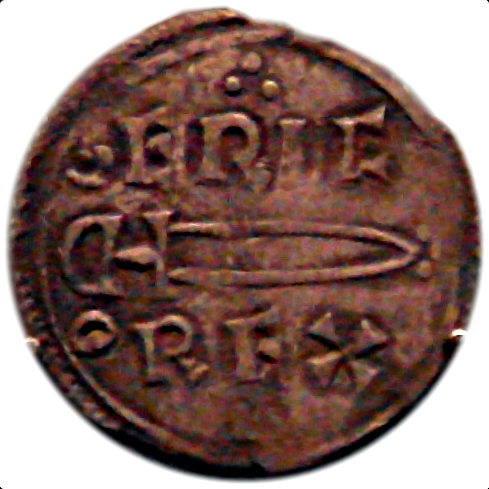
A 1911 Australian penny (top); coin of Eric Bloodaxe (bottom), with legend reading Eric Rex ('King Eric')

A penny is a coin (pl.: pennies) or a unit of currency (pl.: pence) in various countries. Borrowed from the Carolingian denarius (hence its former abbr. d.), it is usually the smallest denomination within a currency system. At present, it is the formal name of the British penny unit (abbr. p, also the name of the British one penny coin) and the de facto name of the American one-cent coin.

Penny is also the informal name of the cent unit of account in Canada, although the Canadian penny's production ended in 2012 and it was withdrawn from circulation in 2013.

The name penny is also used in reference to various historical currencies, also derived from the Carolingian system, such as the French denier and the German pfennig. It may also be informally used to refer to any similar smallest-denomination modern coins, such as the euro cent or Chinese fen.

The Carolingian penny was originally a 0.940-fine silver coin, weighing 1/240 pound. It was adopted by Offa of Mercia and other English kings and remained the principal currency in Europe over the next few centuries, until repeated debasements necessitated the development of more valuable coins. The British penny remained a silver coin until the expense of the Napoleonic Wars prompted the use of base metals in 1797. Despite the decimalization of currencies in the United States and, later, throughout the British Commonwealth, the name remains in informal use.

No penny is currently formally subdivided, although farthings (1/4d), halfpennies, and half cents have previously been minted and the mill (1/10¢) remains in use as a unit of account in some contexts, including consumer petroleum at gas stations in the United States where pricing is often advertised with three decimals.

== Etymology ==
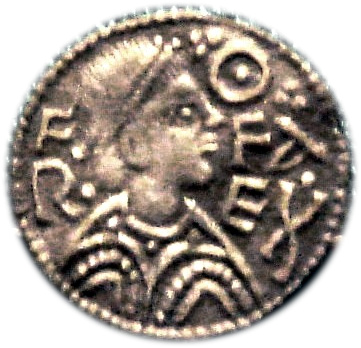
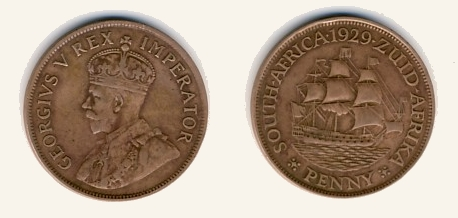
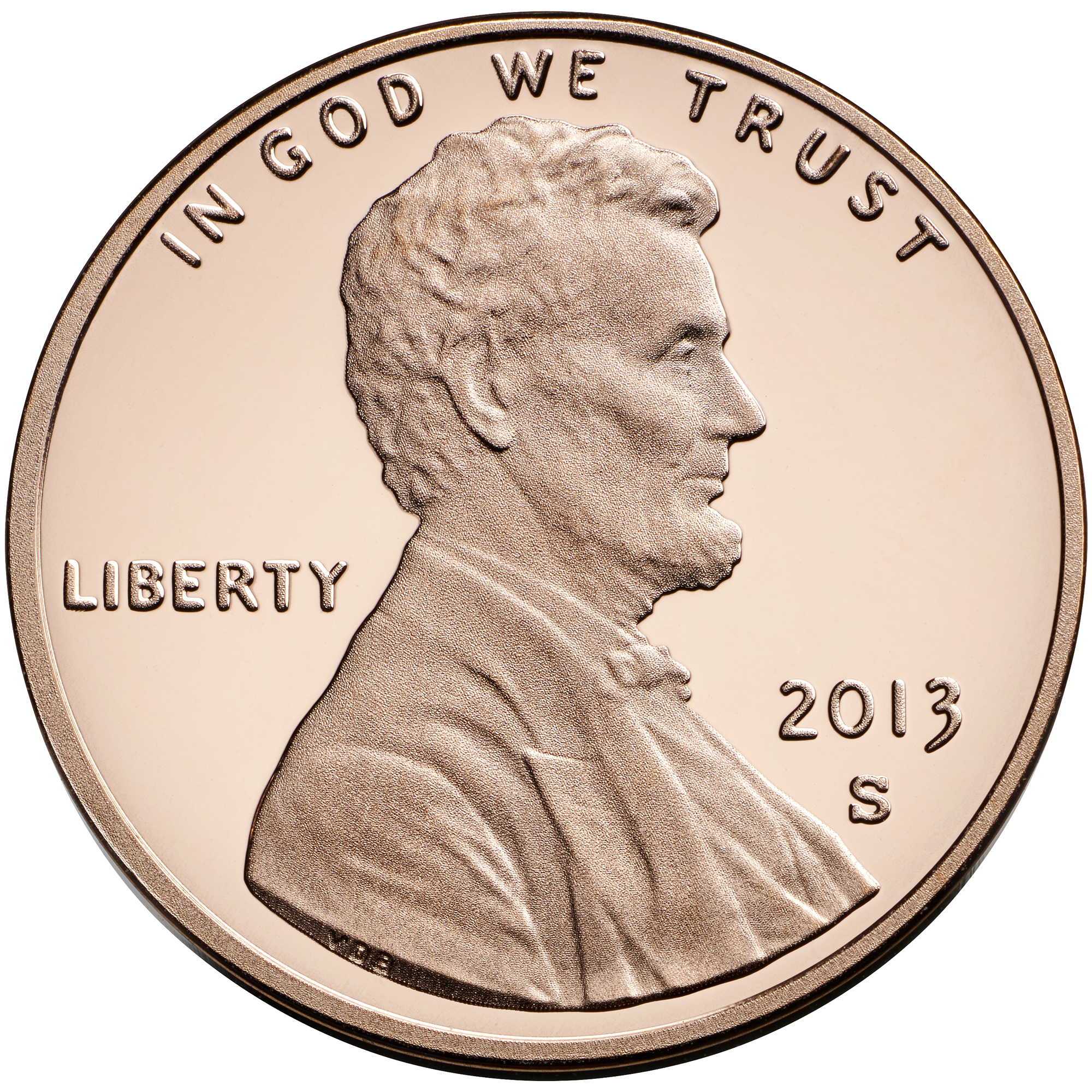
From top to bottom: a penny depicting King Offa of Mercia; a 1929 South African penny; a 2013 one-cent coin from the United States (colloquially called a penny), worth 1/100 of 1 USD (US dollar). As a decimal, it is written as $0.01.

Penny is first attested in a 1394 Scots text, (Note: "He sal haf a penny til his noynsankys...") a variant of Old English peni, a development of numerous variations including pennig, penning, and pending. (Note: The Oxford English Dictionary notes two families of variants, one comprising pæning, pending, peninc, penincg, pening, peningc, and Northumbrian penning and the other peneg, pennig, pænig, penig, penug, pæni, and peni, the later of which gave rise to the modern form.) The etymology of the term "penny" is uncertain, although cognates are common across almost all Germanic languages (Note: Germanic cognates of penny include Dutch, Danish, Swedish, and Old Saxon penning and German: Pfennig in reference to the coin and Icelandic: peningur, Swedish pengar, and Danish: penge in reference to "money". Gothic, however, has 𐍃𐌺𐌰𐍄𐍄𐍃 (skatts) for the occurrence of "denarius" (Ancient Greek: δηνάριος, dēnários) in the New Testament.) and suggest a base *pan-, *pann-, or *pand- with the individualizing suffix -ing. Common suggestions include that it was originally *panding as a Low Franconian form of Old High German pfant "pawn" (in the sense of a pledge or debt, as in a pawnbroker putting up collateral as a pledge for repayment of loans); *panning as a form of the West Germanic word for "frying pan", presumably owing to its shape; and *ponding as a very early borrowing of Latin pondus ("pound"). Recently, it has been proposed that it may represent an early borrowing of Punic pn (Pane or Pene, "Face"), as the face of Carthaginian goddess Tanit was represented on nearly all Carthaginian currency. Following decimalization, the British and Irish coins were marked "new penny" until 1982 and 1985, respectively.

From the 16th century, the regular plural pennies fell out of use in England, when referring to a sum of money (e.g. "That costs tenpence."), but continued to be used to refer to more than one penny coin ("Here you are, a sixpence and four pennies."). It remains common in Scottish English, and is standard for all senses in American English, where, however, the informal "penny" is typically only used of the coins in any case, values being expressed in "cents". The informal name for the American cent seems to have spread from New York State.

In Britain, prior to decimalization, values from two to eleven pence were often written, and spoken as a single word, as twopence or tuppence, threepence or thruppence, etc. (Other values were usually expressed in terms of shillings and pence or written as two words, which might or might not be hyphenated.) Where a single coin represented a number of pence, it was treated as a single noun, as a sixpence. Thus, "a threepence" (but more usually "a threepenny bit") would be a single coin of that value whereas "three pence" would be its value, and "three pennies" would be three penny coins. In British English, divisions of a penny were added to such combinations without a conjunction, as sixpence-farthing, and such constructions were also treated as single nouns. Adjectival use of such coins used the ending -penny, as sixpenny.

The British abbreviation d. derived from the Latin denarius. It followed the amount, e.g. "11d". It has been replaced since decimalization by p, usually written without a space or period. From this abbreviation, it is common to speak of pennies and values in pence as "p". In North America, it is common to abbreviate cents with the currency symbol ¢. Elsewhere, it is usually written with a simple c.

== History ==
=== Antiquity ===
The medieval silver penny was modelled on similar coins in antiquity, such as the Greek drachma, the Carthaginian shekel, and the Roman denarius. Forms of these seem to have reached as far as Norway and Sweden. The use of Roman currency in Britain seems to have fallen off after the Roman withdrawal and subsequent Saxon invasions.

=== Frankish Empire ===
Charlemagne's father Pepin the Short instituted a major currency reform around AD 755, aiming to reorganize Francia's previous silver standard with a standardized .940-fine denier (Latin: denarius) weighing ^{1}/_{240} pound. (As the Carolingian pound seems to have been about 489.5 grams, each penny weighed about 2 grams.) Around 790, Charlemagne introduced a new .950 or .960-fine penny with a smaller diameter. Surviving specimens have an average weight of 1.70 grams, although some estimate the original intended mass at 1.76 grams. But despite the purity and quality of these pennies, they were often rejected by traders throughout the Carolingian period, in favor of the gold coins used elsewhere; this led to repeated legislation against such refusal, to accept the king's currency.

=== England ===
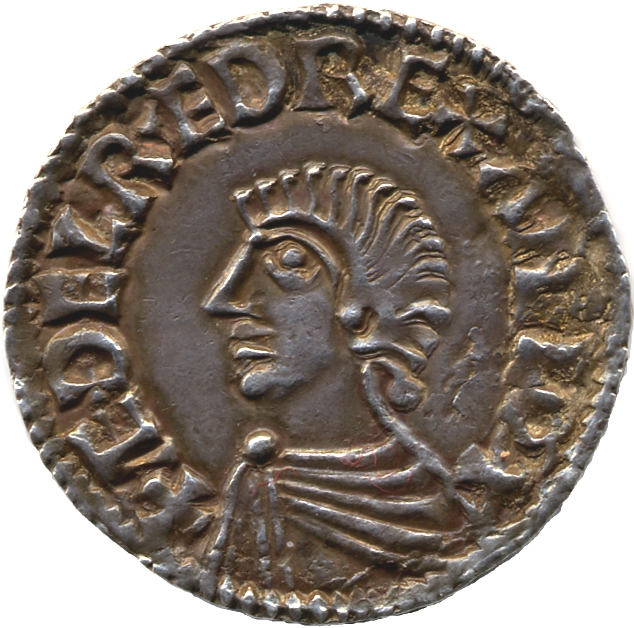
O: Draped bust of Aethelred left. +ÆĐELRED REX ANGLOR[UM]

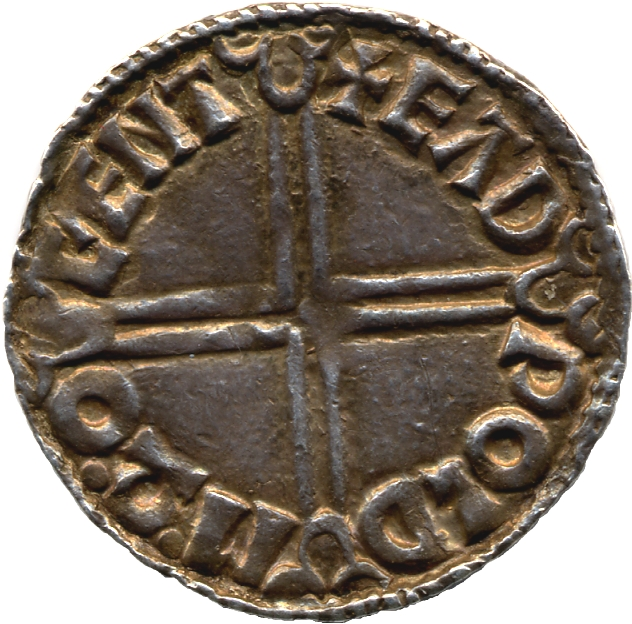
R: Long cross. +EADǷOLD MO CÆNT

Anglo-Saxon silver "Long Cross" penny of Aethelred II, moneyer Eadwold, Canterbury, c. 997–1003. The cross made cutting the coin into half-pennies or farthings (quarter-pennies) easier. (Note spelling Eadƿold in inscription, using Anglo-Saxon letter wynn in place of modern w.)

Some of the Anglo-Saxon kingdoms initially copied the solidus, the late Roman gold coin; at the time, however, gold was so rare and valuable that even the smallest coins had such a great value that they could only be used in very large transactions and were sometimes not available at all. Around 641–670, there seems to have been a movement to use coins with lower gold content. This decreased their value and may have increased the number that could be minted, but these paler coins do not seem to have solved the problem of the value and scarcity of the currency. The miscellaneous silver sceattas minted in Frisia and Anglo-Saxon England after around 680 were probably known as "pennies" at the time. (The misnomer is based on a probable misreading of the Anglo-Saxon legal codes.) Their purity varied and their weight fluctuated from about 0.8 to about 1.3 grams. They continued to be minted in East Anglia under Beonna and in Northumbria as late as the mid-9th century.

The first Carolingian-style pennies were introduced by King Offa of Mercia (r. 757–796), modeled on Pepin's system. His first series was 1/240 of the Saxon pound of 5400 grains (350 grams), giving a pennyweight of about 1.46 grams. His queen Cynethryth also minted these coins under her own name. Near the end of his reign, Offa minted his coins in imitation of Charlemagne's reformed pennies. Offa's coins were imitated by East Anglia, Kent, Wessex and Northumbria, as well as by two Archbishops of Canterbury. As in the Frankish Empire, all these pennies were notionally fractions of shillings (solidi; sol) and pounds (librae; livres) but during this period neither larger unit was minted. Instead, they functioned only as notional units of account. (For instance, a "shilling" or "solidus" of grain was a measure equivalent to the amount of grain that 12 pennies could purchase.) English currency was notionally .925-fine sterling silver at the time of Henry II, but the weight and value of the silver penny steadily declined from 1300 onwards.

In 1257, Henry III minted a gold penny which had the nominal value of 1 shilling 8 pence (i.e. 20 d.). At first, the coin proved unpopular because it was overvalued for its weight; by 1265 it was so undervalued—the bullion value of its gold being worth 2 shillings (i.e. 24 d.) by then—that the coins still in circulation were almost entirely melted down for the value of their gold. Only eight gold pennies are known to survive. It was not until the reign of Edward III that the florin and noble established a common gold currency in England.

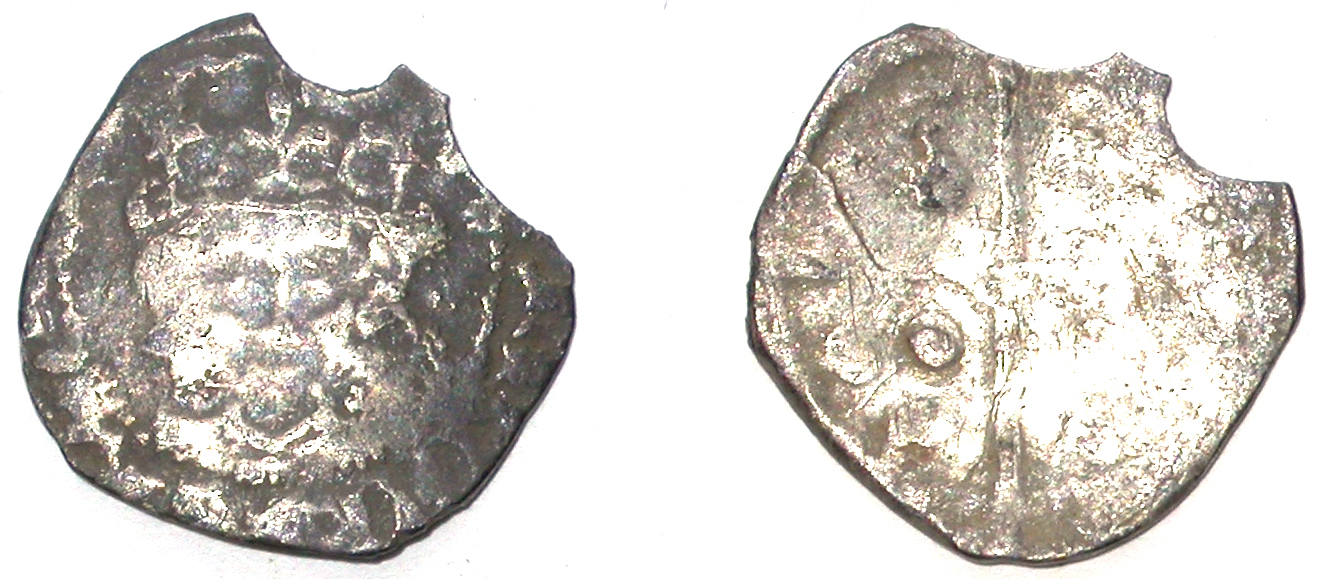
A worn medieval penny, probably dating from the reigns of Henry VI–VII, AD 1413–1461

The earliest halfpenny and farthing (¼d.) found date from the reign of Henry III. The need for small change was also sometimes met by simply cutting a full penny into halves or quarters. In 1527, Henry VIII abolished the Tower pound of 5400 grains, replacing it with the Troy pound of 5760 grains (making a penny 5760/240 = 24 grains) and establishing a new pennyweight of 1.56 grams, although, confusingly, the penny coin by then weighed about 8 grains, and had never weighed as much as this 24 grains. The last silver pence for general circulation were minted during the reign of Charles II around 1660. Since then, they have only been coined for issue as Maundy money, royal alms given to the elderly on Maundy Thursday.

=== United Kingdom ===
Throughout the 18th century, the British government did not mint pennies for general circulation and the bullion value of the existing silver pennies caused them to be withdrawn from circulation. Merchants and mining companies, such as Anglesey's Parys Mining Co., began to issue their own copper tokens to fill the need for small change. Finally, amid the Napoleonic Wars, the government authorized Matthew Boulton to mint copper pennies and twopences at Soho Mint in Birmingham in 1797. Typically, 1 lb. of copper produced 24 pennies. In 1860, the copper penny was replaced with a bronze one (95% copper, 4% tin, 1% zinc). Each pound of bronze was coined into 48 pennies.

=== United States ===
The United States' cent, popularly known as the "penny" since the early 19th century, began with the unpopular copper chain cent in 1793. Abraham Lincoln was the first historical figure to appear on a U.S. coin when he was portrayed on the one-cent coin to commemorate his 100th birthday. The penny was last produced for general circulation on 12 November 2025. The penny will continue to be minted for collectors and historic purposes. The penny remains legal tender and in circulation, as only an act of Congress can abolish a currency.

=== South Africa ===
The penny that was brought to the Cape Colony (in what is now South Africa) was a large coin—36 mm in diameter, 3.3 mm thick, and 1 oz (28 g)—and the twopence was correspondingly larger at 41 mm in diameter, 5 mm thick and 2 oz (57 g). On them was Britannia with a trident in her hand. The English called this coin the Cartwheel penny due to its large size and raised rim, but the Capetonians referred to it as the Devil's Penny as they assumed that only the Devil used a trident. The coins were very unpopular due to their large weight and size. On 6 June 1825, Lord Charles Somerset, the governor, issued a proclamation that only British Sterling would be legal tender in the Cape Colony (colonial South Africa). The new British coins (which were introduced in England in 1816), among them being the shilling, six-pence of silver, the penny, half-penny, and quarter-penny in copper, were introduced to the Cape. Later two-shilling, four-penny, and three-penny coins were added to the coinage. The size and denomination of the 1816 British coins, with the exception of the four-penny coins, were used in South Africa until 1960.

== Criticism of continued use ==
Handling and counting penny coins entail transaction costs that may be higher than a penny. It has been claimed that, for micropayments, even the mental arithmetic costs more than the penny. Changes in the market prices of metals, combined with currency inflation, have caused the metal value of penny coins to exceed their face value.

Canada adopted 5¢ as its lowest circulating denomination in 2013. Several nations have stopped minting equivalent value coins, and efforts have been made to end the routine use of pennies in several countries. In the UK, since 1992, one- and two-penny coins have been made from copper-plated steel (making them magnetic) instead of bronze.

== In popular culture ==
- In British and American culture, finding a penny is traditionally considered lucky. A proverbial expression of this is "Find a penny, pick it up, and all the day you'll have good luck." (Note: This may be the source or a development of the "See a pin and pick it up, all the day you'll have good luck" recorded in a mid-19th century edition of Mother Goose.)
- "A penny for your thoughts" is an idiomatic way of asking someone what they are thinking about. It is first attested in John Heywood's 1547 Dialogue Conteinying the Nomber in Effect of All the Proverbes in the Englishe Tongue, at a time when the penny was still a sterling silver coin.
- "In for a penny, in for a pound," is a common expression used to express someone's intention to see an undertaking through, however much time, effort, or money this entails.
- To "give (one's) tuppence/tuppenny/two'penneth (worth)", is a commonwealth saying that uses the words for two pence to share one's opinion, idea, or point of view, regardless of whether or not others want to hear it. A similar expression using the US term of cents is my two cents.
- In British English, to "spend a penny" means to urinate. Its etymology is literal: coin-operated public toilets commonly charged a pre-decimal penny, beginning with the Great Exhibition of 1851.
- "Tuppence" – Old British slang word for 'vagina'.
- In 1936 U.S. shoemaker G.H. Bass & Co. introduced its "Weejuns" penny loafers. Other companies followed with similar products.
- A common myth is that a penny dropped from the Empire State Building would kill a person or crack the sidewalk. However, a penny is too light and has too much air resistance to acquire enough speed to do much damage since it reaches terminal velocity after falling about 50 feet (15 m).

== List of pennies ==
- Australia: penny (1911–1964)
- Bosnia and Herzegovina: pfenig (1998–present)
- Canada: cent (1858–2012)
- Denmark: penning (c. 830–a. 1873)
- England: penny (c. 785–1707)
- Estonia: penn (1918–1927)
- Falkland Islands: Falkland Islands penny (1974–present)
- Finland: penni (1861–2002)
- France: denier (c. 755–1794)
- Various German states: Pfennig (c. 755–2002)
- Gibraltar: Gibraltar penny (1988–present)
- Guernsey, as an 8-double coin ("Guernsey penny", 1830–1921) and 1/240 of a Guernsey pound (1921–71) and 1/100 of a Guernsey pound (1971–present)
- Ireland: penny, as 1/240 Irish pound (1928–68) and as 1/100 Irish pound (1971–2002)
- Isle of Man: Manx penny (1668–present)
- Jersey: Jersey penny (1841–present)
- Netherlands: penning (8th–16th centuries)
- New Zealand: penny (1940–1967)
- Kingdom of Poland: fenig (1917–1918) and (1918–1924) during Second Polish Republic
- Norway: penning (c. 1000–1873)
- Saint Helena and Ascension Island: Saint Helena penny (1984–present)
- Scotland: Penny Scots/peighinn (c. 1130–1707)
- Sweden: penning (c. 1150–1548)
- South Africa: penny (1923–c. 1961)
- Transvaal: penny (1892–1900)
- United Kingdom: penny, as 1/240 British pound (1707–1971) and as 1/100 British pound (1971–present)
- United States: cent (1793–present, non-circulation only after 2025)
- Medieval Wales: ceiniog (10th–13th centuries)

== See also ==
- Coins of the pound sterling
- Elongated coin (pressed penny)
- Penny debate in the United States
- History of the English penny (c. 600 – 1066)
- Legal Tender Modernization Act
- One-cent coin (disambiguation)
- Penny sizes of nails
- Pennyweight
- Sen, equivalent in Japan used between the 19th century and 1953
- Prutah
