= Half penny =

Half penny, halfpenny, or ha'penny may refer to:

== Coins ==
- Halfpenny (British decimal coin)
- Halfpenny (British pre-decimal coin)
- Halfpenny (Irish pre-decimal coin)
- Halfpenny (Irish decimal coin)
- Halfpenny (Australian coin) (pre-decimal)
- Halfpenny (New Zealand coin) (pre-decimal)
- St Patrick halfpenny, 17th century
- Scottish halfpenny coin, pre-Union
- Half cent, smallest denomination of United States coin

== Other uses ==
- Halfpenny (surname)
- Ha'penny (novel), by Jo Walton
- Ha'penny Bridge, over the Liffey in Dublin
- Halfpenny Bridge, over the Thames in Lechlade, Gloucestershire, England
- Halfpenny Gate, village in County Down, Northern Ireland
- Halfpenny Rose Red, a postage stamp from the reign of Queen Victoria
- Halfpenny, Cumbria, hamlet in Southern Lakeland, Cumbria, England

== See also ==
- Bord halfpenny, a fee paid in markets and fairs by the Saxons to the lord
- Shove ha'penny, a pub game
- "Half-Penny, Two-Penny", 1981 song by Styx
- Penny (disambiguation)
