= Half sen coin =

Lowest Japanese sen denomination

Half Sen
- Japan
- Value: 1/200 Japanese Yen
- Mass: 3.56 g
- Diameter: 21.8 mm
- Shape: circular
- Composition: 98% Copper; 2% Lead & Zinc
- Years of minting: 1873–1888 (Note: Several unique coins dated 1892 are known to have been produced to display at the World's Columbian Exposition. While there are no known existing examples of half sen coins dated 1892 (year 25), they are mentioned by Krause Publications.)

Obverse
- Design: Dragon with value and date of reign.

Reverse
- Design: Wreath with the Chrysanthemum seal.

The half sen coin (半銭) was a Japanese coin worth one two-hundredth of a Japanese yen, as 100 sen equalled 1 yen. All half sen coins were minted during the Meiji period between 1873 and 1888, and are made from nearly pure copper. These coins were later replaced for a brief time by another coin with the same value in the 1910s. The half sen coin was demonetized at the end of 1953 along with other subsidiary coinage and is no longer legal tender. They are now readily available for collectors, as coins from this denomination were minted in large quantities.

== History ==
Half sen coins along with twelve other denominations were adopted by the Meiji government in an act signed on June 27, 1871. This new coinage gave Japan a western style decimal system which was based on units of yen, sen, and rin. Each half sen coin was authorized to weigh 55 grains (3.56 g) struck in a copper alloy. The first coins minted are dated 1870 (year 3), but these were intended as trial strikes or pattern coins. Circulating coins were officially minted starting in 1873 (year 6) with a newly adopted design which eliminated a sunburst previously used on the reverse. All of these coins have the value written in both Arabic and Kanji on opposing sides. The obverse features a dragon with the date of reign, while the reverse has a wreath with a Chrysanthemum seal located above. The half sen was legal tender only up to the amount of 1 yen which was fixed by government regulations. Production of half sen coins continued with the exception of 1878 (year 11) for every year until 1888 (year 21). It is possible that non circulating half sen coins were made again in 1892 (year 25) for display at the World's Columbian Exposition. Coins with a value of one-two-hundredth of a yen were not mentioned again until the Japanese government went on the gold standard in 1897. The half sen coin was later replaced for a brief time by another coin with the same value in the late 1910s. Half sen coins were eventually demonetized at the end of 1953 when the Japanese government passed a law abolishing subsidiary coinage in favor of the yen.

Half sen coins are now bought and sold as collectibles with some more rare than others. The value of any given coin is determined by survivability rate and condition as collectors in general prefer uncleaned appealing coins. Two different varieties exist for the half sen coin in regard to the dragon featured on the reverse side of the coin. One variety has "V scales", while the other design shows "square scales" with the latter being more scarce. Overall, coins from this series can easily be obtained as they were issued in large amounts. An exception includes coins dated 1877 (year 10) with square scales, as this rare variety is worth a premium amount.

== Circulation figures ==
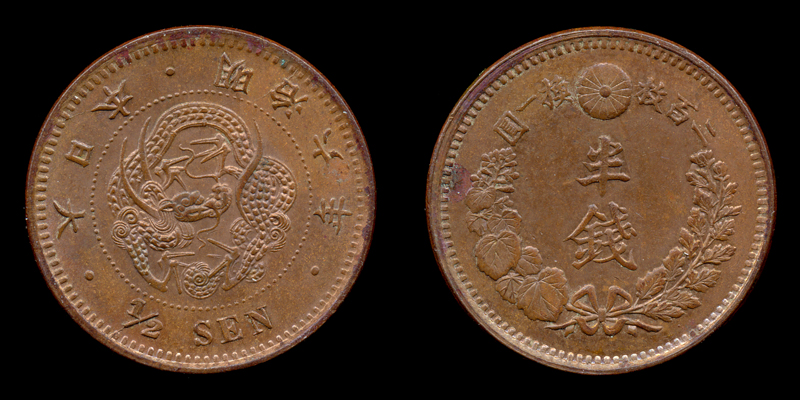
Half sen coin from 1873 (year 6)

Meiji

The following are circulation figures for the half sen coin, all of which were minted between the 3rd, and 21st year of Meiji's reign. The dates all begin with the Japanese symbol 明治 (Meiji), followed by the year of his reign the coin was minted. Each coin is read clockwise from right to left, so in the example used below "二十" would read as "year 12" or 1879.

- "Year" ← "Number representing year of reign" ← "Emperors name" (Ex: 年 ← 二十 ← 治明)

Year of reign	Japanese date	Gregorian date	Mintage
6th	六	1873	16,804,440
7th	七	1874	10,844,710 (Note: The mintage total for 1873 and 1874 as a whole could be 16,804,440 coins.)
8th	八	1875	17,037,928
9th	九	1876	24,292,478
10th	十	1877 (Note: Two varieties were made in 1877 regarding the dragon's body on the obverse side of the coin. One variety has the dragon with "square" scales, while the later variety has the dragon with "V" scales.)	29,278,520
12th	二十	1879	29,963,706
13th	三十	1880	14,090,894
14th	四十	1881	17,929,026
15th	五十	1882	26,458,976
16th	六十	1883	38,202,062
17th	七十	1884	38,480,248
18th	八十	1885	31,166,240
19th	九十	1886	31,831,244
20th	十二	1887	35,651,564
21st	一十二	1888	25,744,686
25th	五十二	1892	Not circulated

== See also ==
- Half penny (disambiguation), similar denominations in other currencies
