= One-cent coin =

Index of articles associated with the same name

A one-cent coin or one-cent piece is a small-value coin minted for various decimal currencies using the cent as their hundredth subdivision.

Examples include:

- the United States one-cent coin, better known as the US penny
- the Canadian one-cent piece, better known as the Canadian penny
- the Australian one-cent coin
- the New Zealand one-cent coin
- the Hong Kong one-cent coin
- the Singapore one-cent coin
- the Brunei one-cent coin
- the one-cent coin of the decimal Dutch guilder (Netherlands)
- the 1 cent euro coin used in several European countries known as the eurozone
- the one-cent coin of the South African rand

== See also ==
- Cent (currency)
- Cent (disambiguation)
- Penny
- Category:One-cent coins
