= 5 rin coin =

Obsolete Japanese coin

Five Rin
- Japan
- Value: 1/200 Japanese Yen
- Mass: 2.1 g
- Diameter: 18.78 mm
- Edge: Smooth
- Shape: circular
- Composition: 95% Copper; 5% Tin and Zinc
- Years of minting: 1916–1919

Obverse

Reverse

The five rin coin (五厘青銅貨) was a Japanese coin worth one two-hundredth of a Japanese yen, as 5 rin equalled 1/2 sen, and 100 sen equaled 1 yen. These coins were a successor to the equally valued half sen coin which was previously minted until 1888. Overall, the history of the five rin coin is brief as they were only minted from 1916 to 1919 before being devalued monetarily. They were later demonetized by the end of 1953 and are now widely available for collectors.

== History ==
Five rin coins are first mentioned in new coinage laws that were passed in 1897, when Japan officially switched to the gold standard. These share the same value as previously issued half sen coin which had been made from 1873 to 1888. Initially the quality of this new "five rin" coin was set in a similar bronze alloy consisting of 95% copper, and 5% tin and zinc. However, only patterns were struck towards the end of Emperor Meiji's reign as the priority at the time was to manufacture gold and silver coins in accordance with the new law.

Five rin coins were eventually minted for circulation in 1916 during the 5th year of Emperor Taishō's reign. This was in response to rising inflation caused by World War I which led to an overall shortage of subsidiary coins. By this time, the "five rin" coin had been reduced in diameter from the size of a formerly issued half sen (21.8mm) down to 18.78mm and weighed over a gram less. Their brief mintage period which lasted only four years came to an end due to a sharp decline in their monetary value. As Japan slipped into a post-war recession, the overall demand for subsidiary coinage had also abated.

Five rin coins were eventually taken out of circulation at the end of 1953 and demonetized. The Japanese government passed a new law during this time that abolished subsidiary coinage in favor of the yen. Five rin coins are now easily available to collectors, due to a large amount of surviving coins that were kept by the public (either as souvenirs or from unused accumulation).

== Circulation figures ==
Taishō

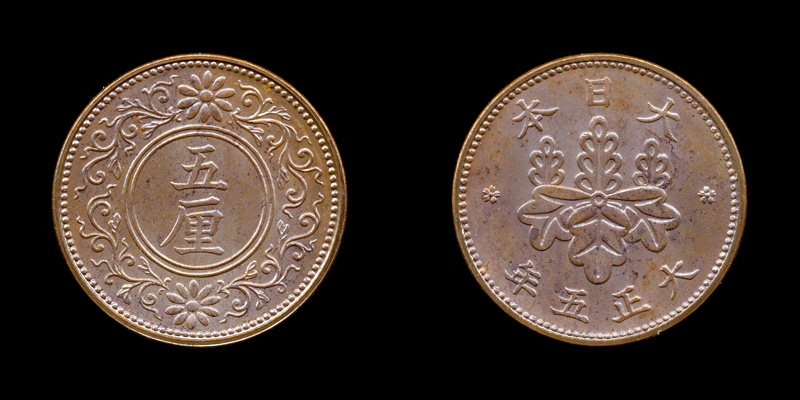
5 rin coin from 1916 (5th year)

The following are circulation figures for the five rin coin, all of which were minted between the 5th and 8th year of Taishō's reign. The dates all begin with the Japanese symbol 大正 (Taishō), followed by the year of his reign the coin was minted. Each coin is read clockwise from right to left, so in the example used below "五" would read as "year 5" or 1916.

"Year" ← "Number representing year of reign" ← "Emperor's name" (Ex: 年 ← 五 ← 正大)

Year of reign	Japanese date	Gregorian date	Mintage
5th	五	1916	8,000,000
6th	六	1917	5,287,584
7th	七	1918	11,661,877
8th	八	1919	17,130,539
