= 2 sen coin =

Japanese coin

Two Sen
- Japan
- Value: 1/50 Japanese yen
- Mass: 14.26 g
- Diameter: 31.8 mm
- Edge: Plain
- Shape: Circular
- Composition: 98% Copper; 2% Tin and Zinc
- Years of minting: 1873–1884; 1892 (Note: Several unique coins dated 1892 are known to have been produced to display at the World's Columbian Exposition. While there are no known existing examples of two sen coins dated 1892 (year 25), they are mentioned by Krause Publications.)

Obverse
- Design: Dragon figure surrounded by legend. (Note: In numismatic terminology, a "legend" is a formal inscription found around the margin of a coin.)

Reverse
- Design: Emblem of the Imperial family.

The 2 sen coin (二銭硬貨) was a Japanese coin worth one-fiftieth of a Japanese yen, as 100 sen equalled 1 yen. Two sen coins were minted during the Meiji period, and are made from nearly pure copper. Priority was initially given to silver coins when the new yen currency system was adopted in 1871 as copper coins could not be produced yet. Aside from a design change and a two year lapse, two sen coins were made from 1873 to 1884. (Note: Not including those made in 1892.) The two sen coin was then discontinued and eventually demonetized in the mid-20th century. These coins are now sought after as collector's items which bring premium amounts depending on the date and condition.

== History ==
Two sen coins were introduced on August 29, 1873 by government notification stating that they were to be double the weight of a sen. This came about two years after a new currency system was adopted by the Meiji government in an act signed on June 27, 1871. The new coinage gave Japan a western style decimal system which was based on units of yen which was broken down into subsidiary coinage of sen, and rin. Silver coins in general (starting at 5 sen) were prioritized over copper coinage as the technology to produce the latter was considered to be poor at the time. Each two sen coin was struck in a copper alloy, which was authorized to weigh 220 grains (14.26 g) with a 1.25 inch diameter (31.8mm). The obverse features a dragon with the date of reign, while on the reverse a wreath design is used with a Chrysanthemum seal located above surrounded by the words "50 for one yen" in Kanji. Both sides of the coin have the value "2 sen" written in both English and Kanji. Two sen coins were legal tender only up to the amount of 1 yen which was fixed by government regulations. Only trial coins dated year 6 were produced in 1873 before the denomination was officially issued for circulation in the following year.

The dragon on the obverse side of the coin was later altered in 1877. Two different major coin varieties were made that year when the scales on the dragon were changed from a square pattern to a V-shaped pattern. No coins are dated from year 11 or 12 (1878 and 1879) as a sufficient amount of 2 sen had already been issued in the years preceding. While production resumed in 1880 with coins dated year 13, the continuation of the issue would be short lived. Two sen coins were eventually discontinued in 1884 as their large size had caused them to be inconvenient. It is possible that non circulating two sen coins were made again in 1892 (year 25) for display at the World's Columbian Exposition. The coins continued to retain their legal tender status until the end of 1953 when the Japanese government passed a law abolishing subsidiary coinage in favor of the yen.

Two sen coins are now bought and sold as collectibles with some more rare than others. The value of any given coin is determined by survivability rate and condition as collectors in general prefer uncleaned appealing coins. Coins dated 1873 (year 6) are worth the most as their mintage is small when compared to the other dates.

== Circulation figures ==
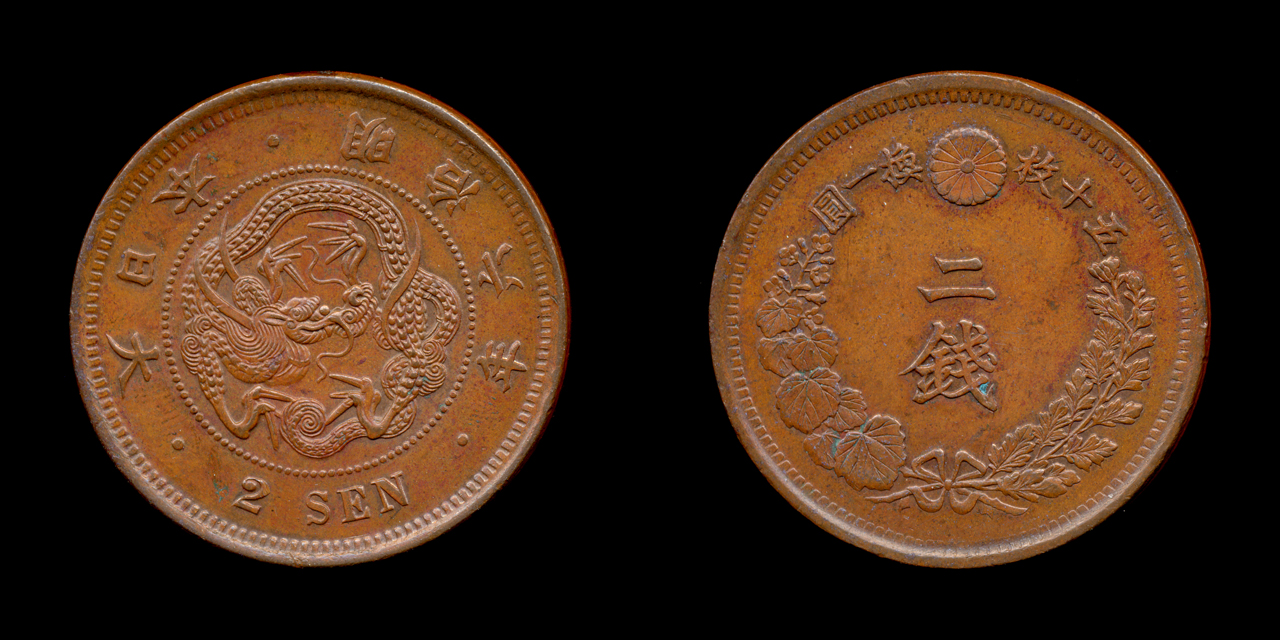
2 sen coin from 1873 (year 6)

Meiji

The following are circulation figures for the two sen coin, all of which were minted between the 6th, and 25th year of Meiji's reign. The dates all begin with the Japanese symbol 明治 (Meiji), followed by the year of his reign the coin was minted. Each coin is read clockwise from right to left, so in the example used below "九" would read as "year 9" or 1876.

- "Year" ← "Number representing year of reign" ← "Emperors name" (Ex: 年 ← 九 ← 治明)

Year of reign	Japanese date	Gregorian date	Mintage
6th	六	1873	3,949,758
7th	七	1874	Unknown
8th	八	1875	22,835,255
9th	九	1876	25,817,570
10th	十	1877 (Square scales) (Note: Two varieties were made in 1877 regarding the dragon's body on the obverse side of the coin. One variety has the dragon with "square" scales, while the later variety has the dragon with "V" scales.)	33,097,868
10th	十	1877 (V-scales)	43,290,398
13th	三十	1880	33,142,307
14th	四十	1881	38,475,569
15th	五十	1882	43,572,187
16th	六十	1883	19,476,164
17th	七十	1884	12,090,586
25th	五十二	1892	Not circulated
