= Halfpenny (surname) =

Halfpenny is a surname. Notable people with the surname include:

- Ben Halfpenny, English rugby league footballer of the 1920s and 1930s
- Brian Halfpenny (1936-2024), British Anglican priest
- Bronwyn Halfpenny (born 1963), Australian politician and daughter of John Halfpenny
- Chelsea Halfpenny (born 1991), English actress
- Jill Halfpenny, English actress
- John Halfpenny (1935-2003), Australian trade unionist and father of Bronwyn Halfpenny
- Leigh Halfpenny, Welsh rugby footballer
- William Halfpenny, English 18th-century architectural designer
