= Halfpenny (British decimal coin) =

Demonetised unit of currency that was worth one two-hundredth of a pound sterling

- United Kingdom
- Value: £0.005
- Mass: 1.78 g
- Diameter: 17.14 mm
- Thickness: 1 mm
- Edge: plain
- Composition: bronze
- Years of minting: 1971–1984

Obverse
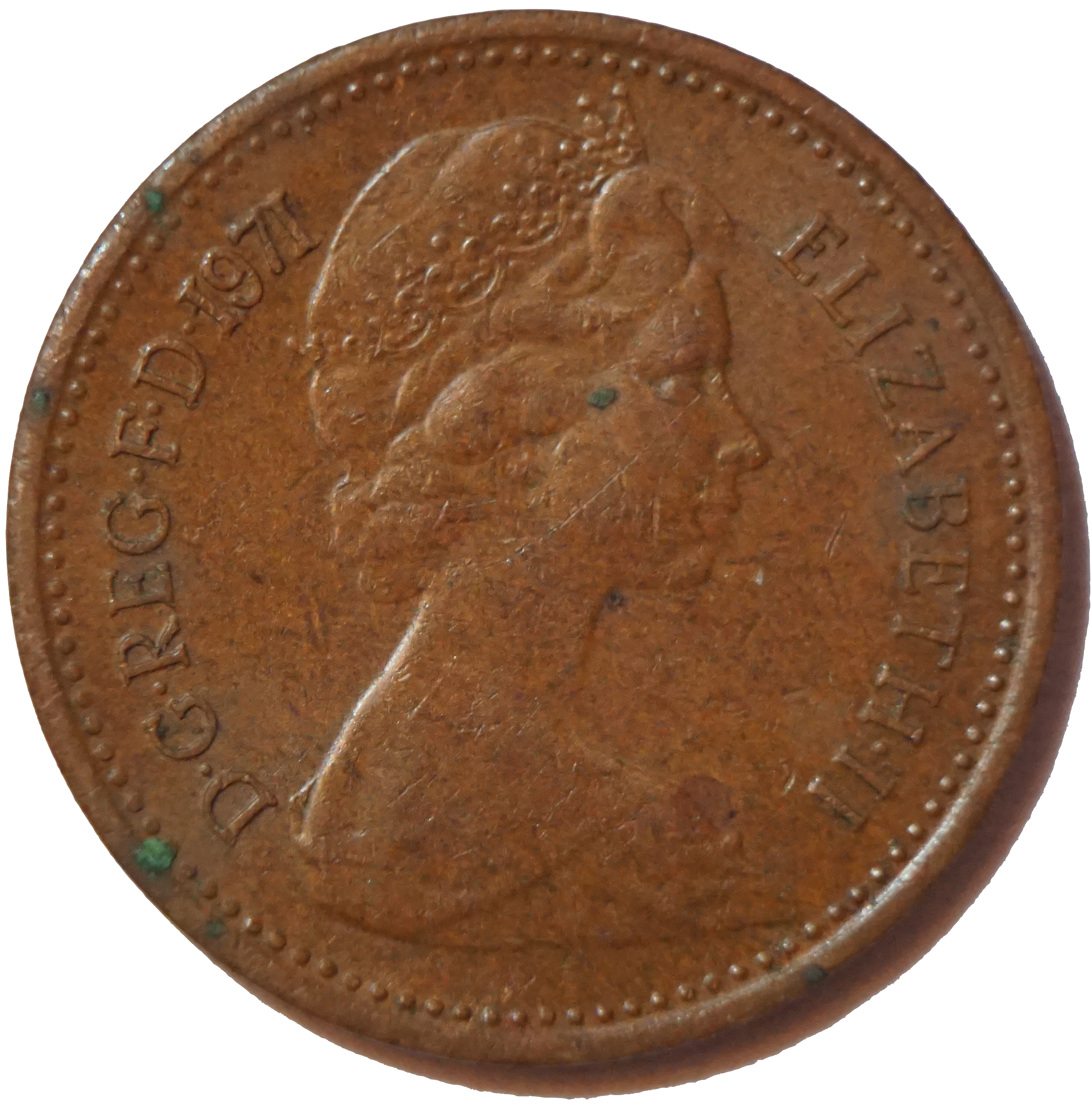
- Design: Queen Elizabeth II
- Designer: Arnold Machin
- Design date: 1971

Reverse
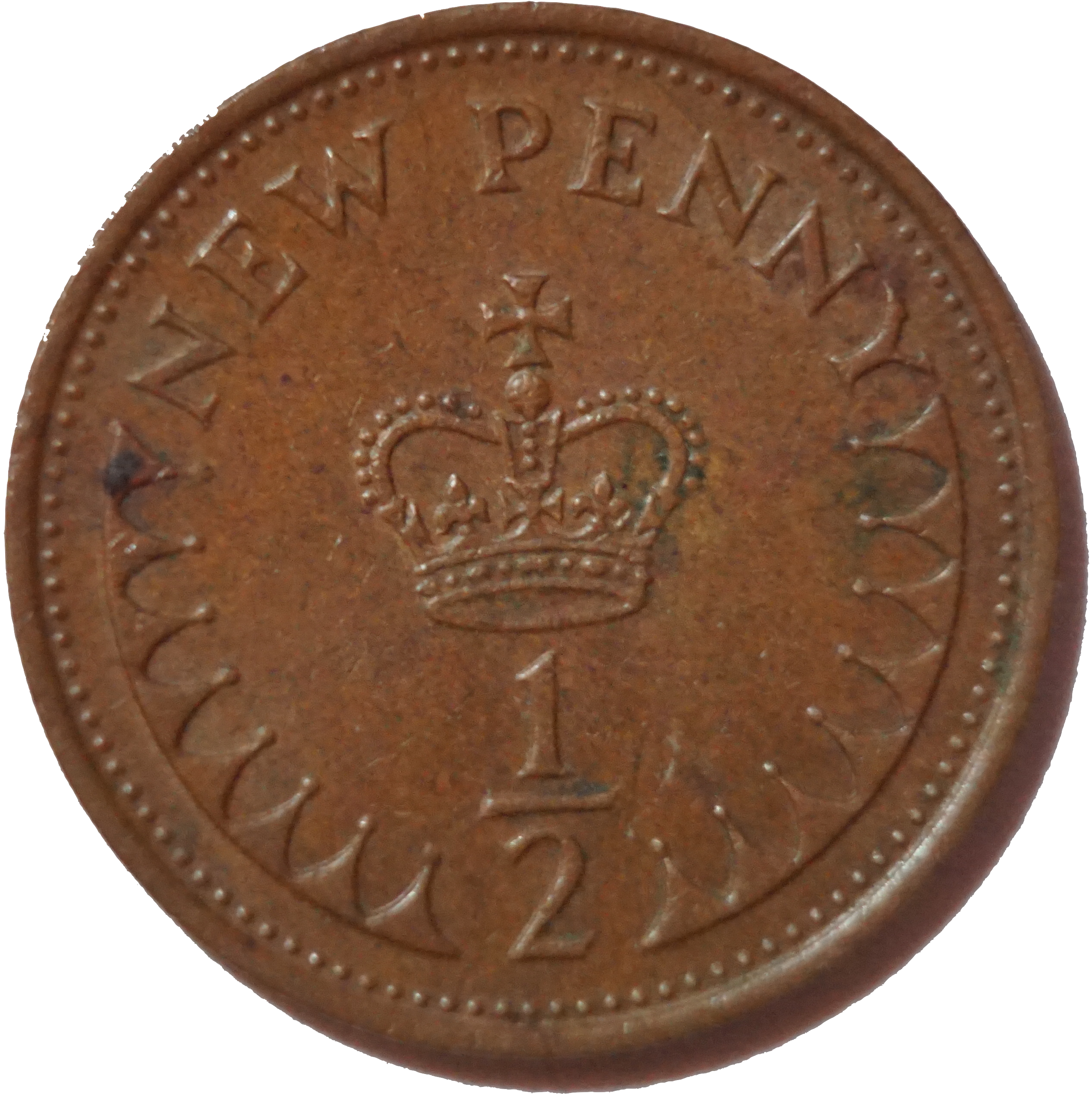
- Design: St Edward's Crown
- Designer: Christopher Ironside
- Design date: 1971

The British decimal halfpenny (/ˈheɪpni/ HAPE-nee) (1/2p) coin was a denomination of sterling coinage introduced in February 1971, at the time of decimalisation, and was worth 1/200 of one pound. It was ignored in banking transactions, which were carried out in units of 1p.

The decimal halfpenny had the same value as 1.2 pre-decimal pence, and was introduced to enable the prices of some low-value items to be more accurately translated to the new decimal currency. The possibility of setting prices including an odd half penny also made it more practical to retain the pre-decimal sixpence in circulation (with a value of 2 1/2 new pence) alongside the new decimal coinage.

The halfpenny coin's obverse featured the profile of Queen Elizabeth II; the reverse featured an image of St Edward's Crown. It was minted in bronze (like the 1p and 2p coins). It was the smallest decimal coin in both size and value, the size being in proportion to 1p and 2p coins.

The halfpenny soon became Britain's least favourite coin. HM Treasury argued the halfpenny was important in the fight against inflation, as it prevented prices from being rounded up. Nevertheless, the coin was demonetised and withdrawn from circulation in December 1984.

== Design ==
The reverse of the coin, designed by Christopher Ironside, was a representation of St Edward's Crown, with the numeral "1/2" below the crown, and either NEW PENNY (1971–1981) or HALF PENNY (1982–1984) above the crown. Only one design for the obverse was used on the halfpenny coin. The inscription around the portrait on the obverse was ELIZABETH II D.G.REG.F.D. 19xx, where 19xx was the year of minting. Both sides of the coin are encircled by dots, a common feature on coins known as beading.

As on all decimal coins produced before 1984, the portrait of Queen Elizabeth II by Arnold Machin appeared on the obverse; in this portrait the Queen wore the 'Girls of Great Britain and Ireland' Tiara.

== Status ==
The half penny coin was legal tender for amounts not exceeding 20 pence.

== Mintages ==
Number of decimal halfpenny coins minted for circulation by year
Year	Number minted
1971	1,394,188,251
1972	In proof sets only
1973	365,680,000
1974	365,448,000
1975	197,600,000
1976	412,172,000
1977	66,368,000
1978	59,532,000
1979	219,132,000
1980	202,788,000
1981	46,748,000
1982	190,752,000
1983	7,600,000
1984	In proof and uncirculated sets only

Mint sets have been produced since 1982; where mintages on or after that date indicate 'none', there are examples contained within those sets.

== Proposed quarter penny coin ==
A decimal quarter-penny coin (to be struck in aluminium) was also proposed (which would have allowed the pre-decimal threepence to continue to circulate with a value of 1 1/4 new pence), but was never produced.

== See also ==
- Halfpenny (Irish decimal coin)
