= József Reményi =

József Reményi (23 January 1887 Kosice – 25 December 1977 Budapest) was a Hungarian sculptor, medallist, and coin designer who, following his studies in Italy and (Germany), worked as teacher of applied arts and was later nominated the artistic director of the Hungarian Mint. Considered one of the creators of Hungarian numismatic art, he designed more than 900 plaques and coins, including several items of Hungarian forint currency.
