= Fidelity Printers and Refiners =

Zimbabwean company

- Type: Private company limited by shares
- Industry: Currency & security printing, coin Minting, precious metals refinery
- Founded: 1966; 60 years ago
- Headquarters: Harare, Zimbabwe
- Number of locations: 2 facilities (Harare and Bulawayo)
- Area served: Zimbabwe
- Key people: General Manager - Peter Magaramombe
- Products: Banknotes, passports, certificates, cheques, gold and silver bullion
- Owner: Reserve Bank of Zimbabwe
- Number of employees: 1000
- Website: fgr.co.zw

Fidelity Printers and Refiners (FPR) is a Zimbabwean security printing and gold refinery company wholly owned by the Reserve Bank of Zimbabwe. The company was established in 1966. FPR operates from a printing and gold refinery plant located in Msasa Industrial area in Harare and a coin minting facility in Bulawayo.

== History ==
=== Foundation and secret operations (1966) ===
After Rhodesia's Unilateral Declaration of Independence by Ian Smith in 1966, the British private banknote printer Bradbury Wilkinson and Company, was ordered by the British government to cease printing currency for the Reserve Bank of Rhodesia as part of sanctions against the Unilateral declaration of independence.

The Rhodesian government then went on to sign a contract with Giesecke & Devrient, in which the first order of its banknotes was seized by the British secret service as counterfeit notes at Frankfurt Airport en route to Harare (then Salisbury). The Reserve Bank of Rhodesia refused to pay Giesecke & Devrient for the seized notes. This forced Giesecke & Devrient CEO Siegfried Otto to quickly make arrangements to supply some of his old intaglio and background printing lines. At the same time, he sourced brand new Super printing lines for his new customer. The equipment was delivered in secrecy to a South African registered proxy company.

By the time the British secret service realised this, the printing machines had already been shipped across the border from South Africa into Rhodesia and installed at the Bank Chambers, commonly referred to as the Old Reserve Bank Building along Samora Machel Avenue in Harare. A few months later, Siegfried Otto sourced and delivered five new printing lines for Rhodesia from Organisation Giori. Because Rhodesia was already recognized as a banknote printing country, the British secret service could not interfere with the delivery of the machines. This arrangement further strengthened the position of Lousenthal, a Giesecke & Devrient subsidiary, as a banknote paper supplier to Rhodesia. A contract was then signed with Lousenthal being the banknote paper supplier to Rhodesia and Zimbabwe after attaining independence.

=== Establishment of the company (1978) ===
The printing operations were to print banknotes and other high-security government documents in the basement of the old Reserve Bank building. In a few years of its establishment, Fidelity Printers, with the help of technical partners in Giesecke & Devrient, Koenig & Bauer then Organisation Giori, SICPA and many others, Fidelity Printers and Refinery achieved recognition as a banknote printing operation producing secure notes.

The company was incorporated in 1978 when the Central Bank board decided to privatize and commercialize its printing operations. Fidelity Printers was then established in December 1978. After this, the company was moved from the Old Reserve Bank Building basement in the then-Salisbury central business district to the Msasa Industrial area at number 1 George Drive. The new printing complex was designed in Germany and modeled around leading European banknote printing plants. Construction commenced in April 1980 and was completed at the end of 1981. The plant was opened by the then Prime Minister Mr. Robert G. Mugabe on 11 February 1982

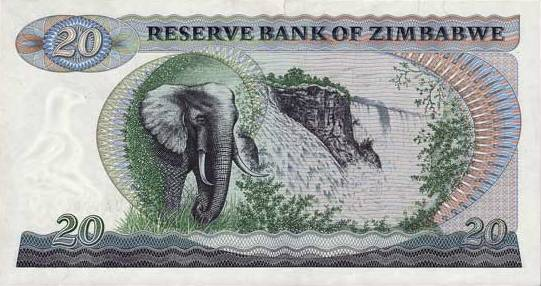
Reserve Bank of Zimbabwe 1980 $20 note

Products include currency, passports, examination papers, traveler's cheques, Commercial Bank cheques, passbooks, and a wide range of other government security documents, Gold and silver bullion. Some products were made to customer specifications and produced to international standards for domestic, regional, and international markets. Dr. L. Tsumba reported that the foreign exchange savings arising from these activities were impressive hence the decision in 2001 to establish a local coin minting plant. The Central Bank then founded the Zimbabwe Mint located in Bulawayo and handed it into the custody of Fidelity Printers and Refinery.

=== Gold refinery (1987–2001) ===
In 1987 the bank Board decided to increase the company's role in national economic growth by adding a new operation, Gold processing, and refining, at Fidelity Printers; thus, the company name was changed to Fidelity Printers and Refinery. Initially, the company had a production capacity of 50 tonnes of Gold per year at a purity of 99.999. with such production capacities, the company was then awarded accreditation from the London Bullion Market Association (LBMA) was obtained in October 1989.

Gold from other countries was refined for either return to the customer or sale on the international market on behalf of the customer. The Refinery produces 400 oz. Bars, to international standard, and fine Gold for use by the domestic Jewellery Industry.

=== Hyper-inflation years (1980s–2009) ===
During the hyperinflationary years, the company produced high-denomination notes to beat Zimbabwe's rapidly rising inflation rate. At the request of the RBZ under the stewardship of its governor Dr. Gideon Gono released several series of the Zimbabwe currency.

The Highest note ever printed in the world was the Z$100 Trillion note Printed by Fidelity Printers and Refinery in 2008 when the inflation rate had breached 3,840,000,000,000,000,000% by September 2008. Most of these notes were rejected on the market mainly because there was no change for them and, secondly, lack of confidence in the value of the letters. People opted to trade in United States dollars, South African Rands, and other forms of foreign currency. The rate of inflation and how fast the money lost value could be seen in the watermarks on the banknote paper. Some bills were printed on paper watermarked with 1000 in them denoting that the article was intended for $1000 note which was the highest note in the country in other cases the vast figures were printed on paper reserved for 500, 100 or 50 dollar notes.

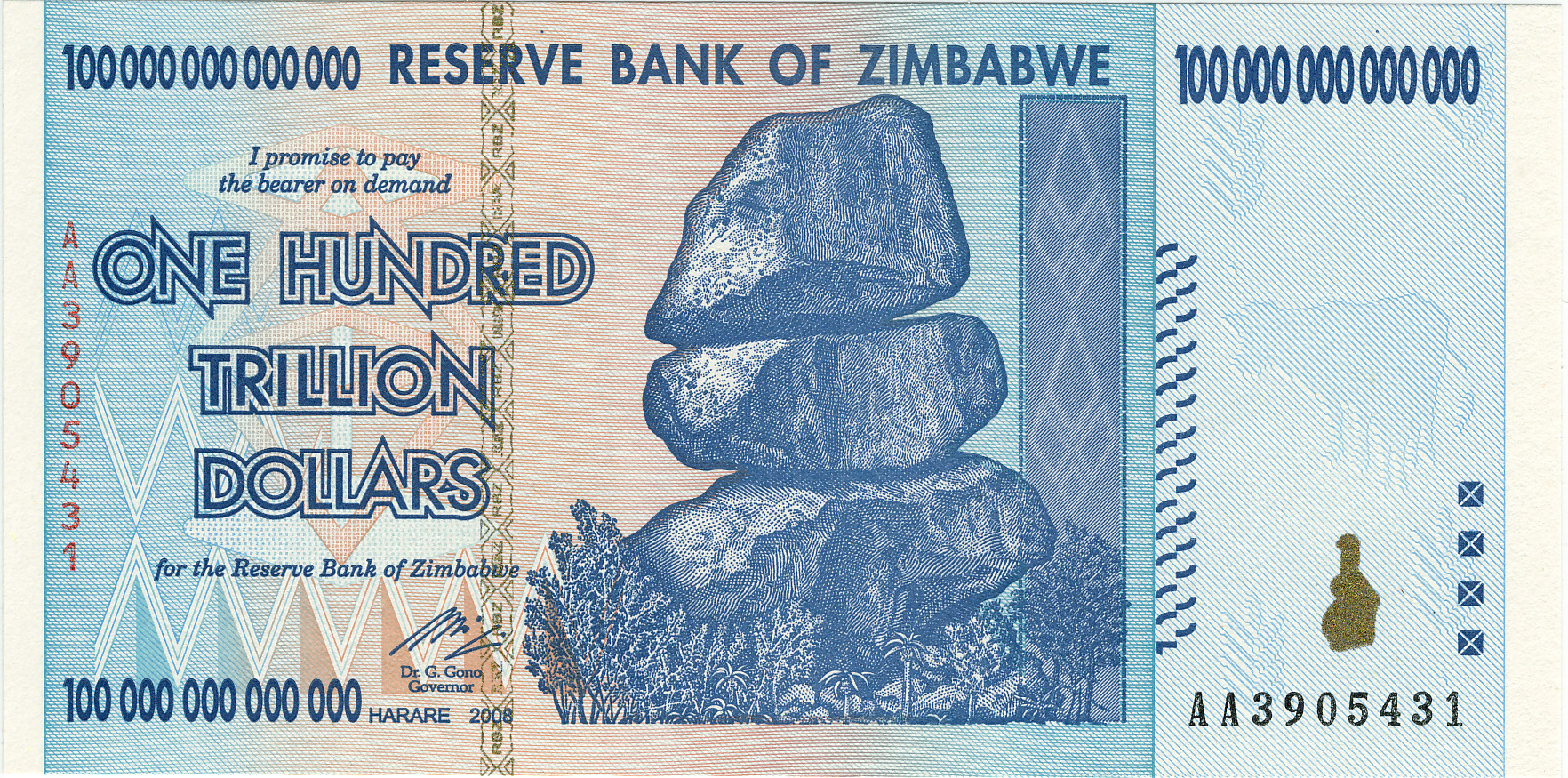
Reserve Bank of Zimbabwe $100 Trillion note printed by Fidelity Printers and Refinery

At the beginning of 2008, demand for cash tripled so that FPR could not keep up with the order; they had to contract their technical partner Giesecke & Devrient to run a parallel production of a series of notes with different serial numbers to meet the ever-rising demand for cash. The letters were then flown to Harare overnight and delivered to the Reserve Bank of Zimbabwe for distribution to banks and into circulation.Giesecke & Devrient would provide 170 trillion Zimbabwe dollars weekly to the RBZ. The economist John Robertson was quoted at that time saying " Cash shortages are an inevitable product of hyperinflation, Even at the official rate of inflation, it is stretching the central bank's ability to print new money to keep up with inflation and the subsequent rise in the cost of goods."

=== Impact of sanctions (2008) ===
In July 2008, the supplier of Banknote paper to FPR Louisenthal and its parent company G+D, was pressured by the German government to suspend all banknote paper supplies, technical and printing services to Fidelity Printers and Refiners. The reason cited for the suspension was that the company was supplying resources being used to prop up the Robert Mugabe regime by printing the currency, which was then used to pay the militias, police, and army to stifle the people from expressing their views and opinions about the government and voting against it. The money was used to set up networks of command bases around the country manned by liberation war veterans and youth militias, hired to terrify the population into voting for Mugabe in the runup to the June 27 presidential runoff election. The G+D CEO, Dr. Karsten Ottenberg, was quoted a few days later saying "Our decision is a reaction to the political tension in Zimbabwe, which is mounting significantly rather than easing as expected and takes account of the critical evaluation by the international community, German government and general public.

A few days later, The Jura JSP software revoked their Banknote design software licensed to Fidelity Printers and Refinery. This move threatened to cripple the operations of Fidelity Printers and Refinery as the design department was crucial and integral to the printing operations; it had to constantly conceive new notes to replace the ones that were already on streets are rendered worthless by hyperinflation. The Swiss company, SICPA, which supplied FPR with secure inks also gave in to pressure from the European Union and stopped supplying inks to Fidelity Printers and Refinery but considered setting up an associate company in South Africa to bypass the sanctions to provide Fidelity Printers and Refiners with secure inks for banknote production. Unconfirmed reports say the company was set up in South Africa and operated briefly, enabling Zimbabwe to access inks from SICPA.

While under sanctions, the company had to seek alternatives to secure quality banknote papers immediately. FPR tried to connect alternative suppliers in Argentina, Indonesia, Russia, and China. Representatives from FPR and the RBZ traveled to Argentina to inspect one of the companies that had expressed interest in supplying banknote papers. Still, they were denied entry into Argentina despite assurances of Visas issuance upon arrival. The Pura Group of Indonesia also offered to deliver banknote papers within one and a half months of securing a contract. While this was being done, a stop-gap measure was implemented where Kadoma Papermills briefly switched into research and development mode to assist. This was a very tough challenge as there was no technical expertise for manufacturing banknote papers in the country. The company (Kadoma Papermills) came up with a product that could be used as banknote paper though the quality was far below the expected. FPR was also concerned if a scenario occurred where one of the KBA printing machines would fail or break down, as this would have significantly weakened the country since the company had been sanctioned. The German partners were withdrawing all forms of material and technical support. Alternatives were entertained and briefly considered as a mitigating strategy; however, they were never taken up beyond the high-level discussions as the Economy was then dollarized. Considerations were to purchase the Japanese-made Komori currency equipment, but no formal contact or expression of interest was ever made to Komori Corporation.

To ensure continuous production and supply of Banknotes, the RBZ approached another local security printing company, Celsys, offering it a contract to print banknotes. This, however, did not materialize because the Zimbabwe Dollar was demonetized and production suspended three months later by the finance minister Tendai Biti.

=== Expulsion from London Bullion Market (2008) ===
Gold production in Zimbabwe had been falling, from 10.960 tonnes in 2006 to 3.072 tonnes in 2008, a drop of more than 40 percent. On 30 June 2008, Fidelity Printers and Refinery was expelled from the LBMA because it failed to produce a minimum of 10 tonnes per year to maintain its membership. Fidelity Printers and Refinery had been the sole authorized buyer and exporter of Gold in Zimbabwe, because of its expulsion from the LBMA RBZ Governor Gideon Gono had to allow Zimbabwean producers to sell Gold directly to international buyers.

The failure was mainly attributed to the fact that the whole Zimbabwean economy was in crisis and Fidelity Printers and Refinery, being the sole buyer of Gold in the country under sanctions, was failing to pay miners on time and competitive prices thus; mines were now also shutting down. Some producers have criticized the government for making F.P.R. the sole buyer of Gold in the country, while others have come out to support the government. Economist Erich Bloch said "It is right for Fidelity Printers to be the exclusive buyer of gold, and that happens in South Africa and other parts of the world".

== Operations ==
The printing plant is equipped with some KBA Super Simultan, KBA Super Numerator, KBA Giori Super Orloff Intaglio (Colour), KBA NotaSys, KBA Rapida, Roland Favorit. With this the company has the capacity to produce over 200 million pieces of banknotes per year. Fidelity Printers and Refinery also makes use of some digital printing systems like the OCE Prisma system for light commercial jobs. For card personalisation and recharge cards the company operates Atlantic Zeiser and KBA Universys and Muhlbauer HSO systems. The passport department also employs a Muhlbauer systems for passport and passbooks production. The plant still owns and runs some very old printing machinery like the Heidelberg printing presses.

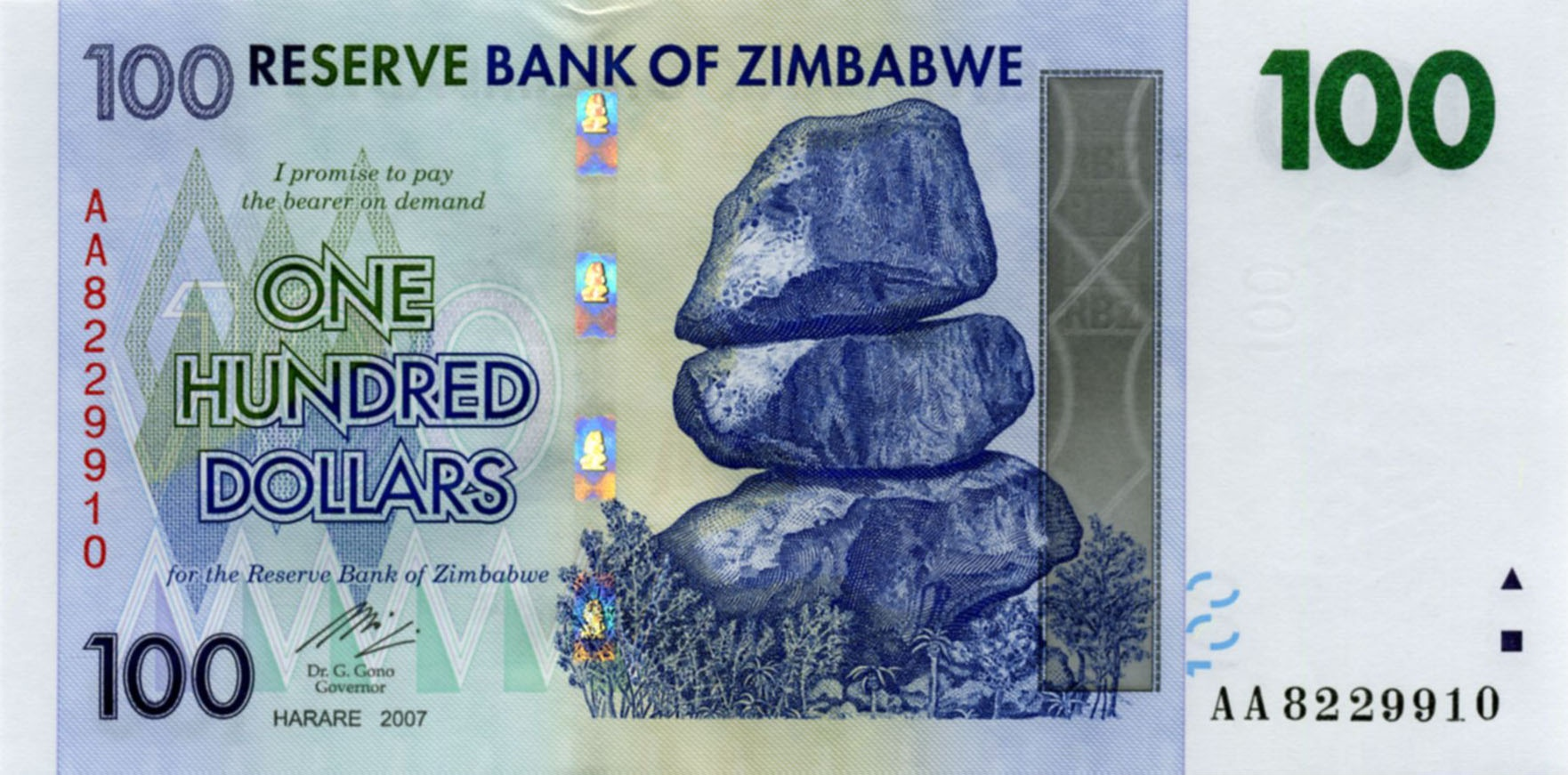
Reserve Bank of Zimbabwe $100 printed in 2007 released in 2008

=== Security printing ===
- Banknotes
- Passports
- Visa labels
- Bank cheques
- Ballot paper
- Birth certificates
- Government bond certificates
- Share certificates
- Examination question papers

=== Commercial printing ===
- Rechargeable calling cards
- Corporate annual reports
- Continuous forms
- Tickets and coupons
- Passbook
- Secure airline tickets
