= List of mints =

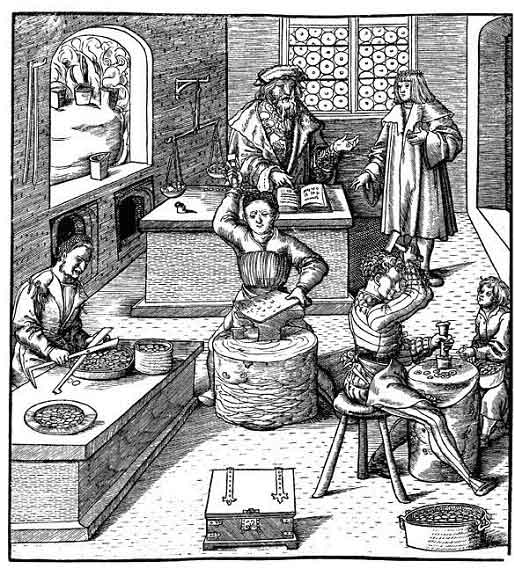
European Medieval mint

Mints designed for the manufacture of coins have been commonplace since coined currency was first developed around 600 BC by the Lydian people of modern-day Turkey. The popularity of coins spread across the Mediterranean so that by the 6th century BC nearby regions of Athens, Aegina, Corinth and Persia had all developed their own coins.

Methods used at mints to produce coins have changed as technology has developed, with early coins either being cast using moulds to produce cast coins or being struck between two dies to produce hammered coin. Around the middle of the 16th century machine-made milled coins were developed, allowing coins of a higher quality to be made.

National currencies are generally minted by a country's central bank or on its behalf by an independent mint. For example, the coins of the New Zealand Dollar are minted jointly by the Royal Mint in the United Kingdom and the Royal Canadian Mint for the Reserve Bank of New Zealand. Also national mints are sometimes privatised to become state-owned enterprises allowing them to pursue commercial interests such as producing commemorative coins, medals and different types of bullion.

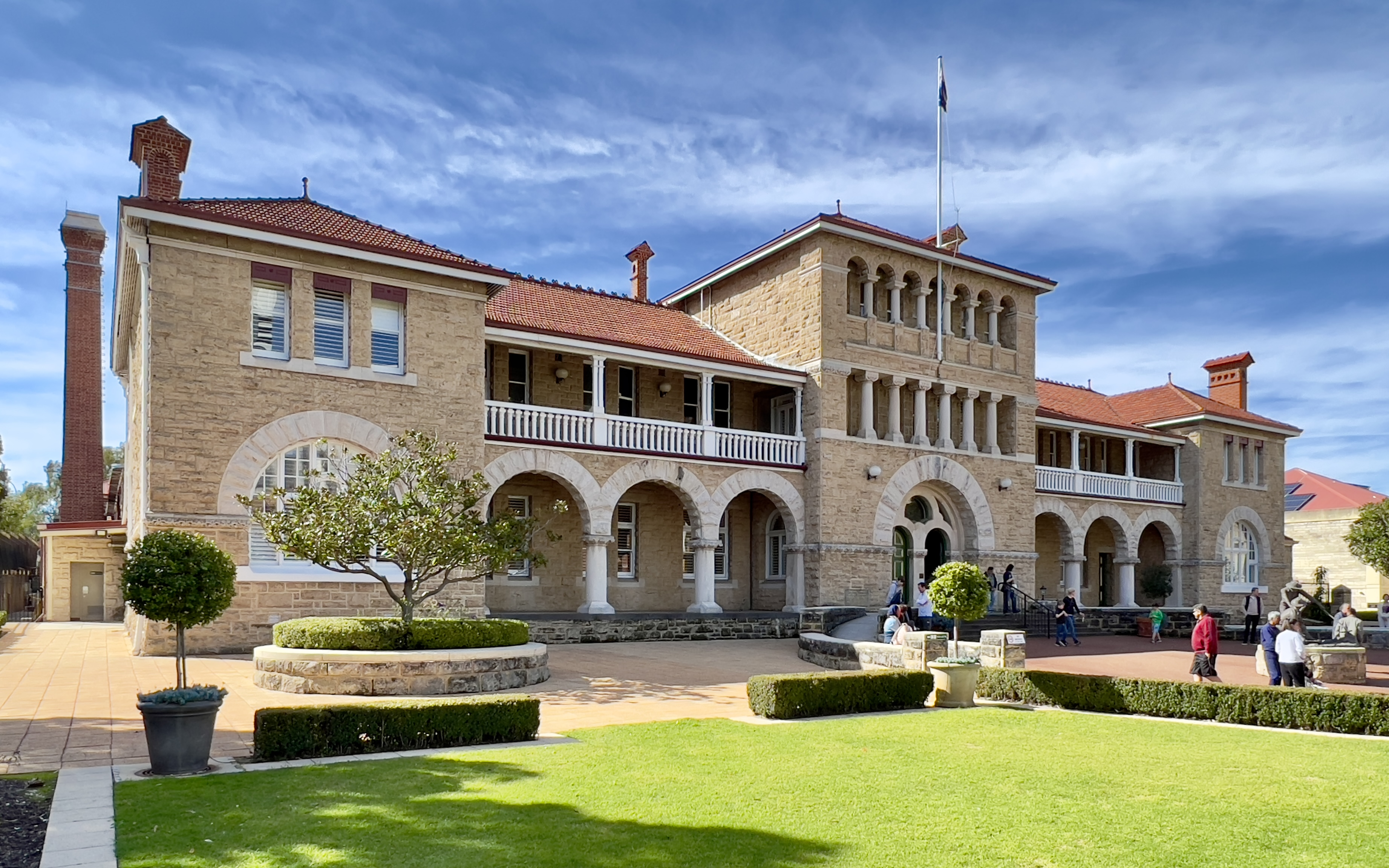
Perth Mint, Australia

Today the United States Mint is largest mint manufacturer in the world, operating across six sites and producing as many as 28 billion coins in a single year. Its largest site is the Philadelphia Mint which covers 650,000 square feet (6 hectares) and can produce 32 million coins per day.

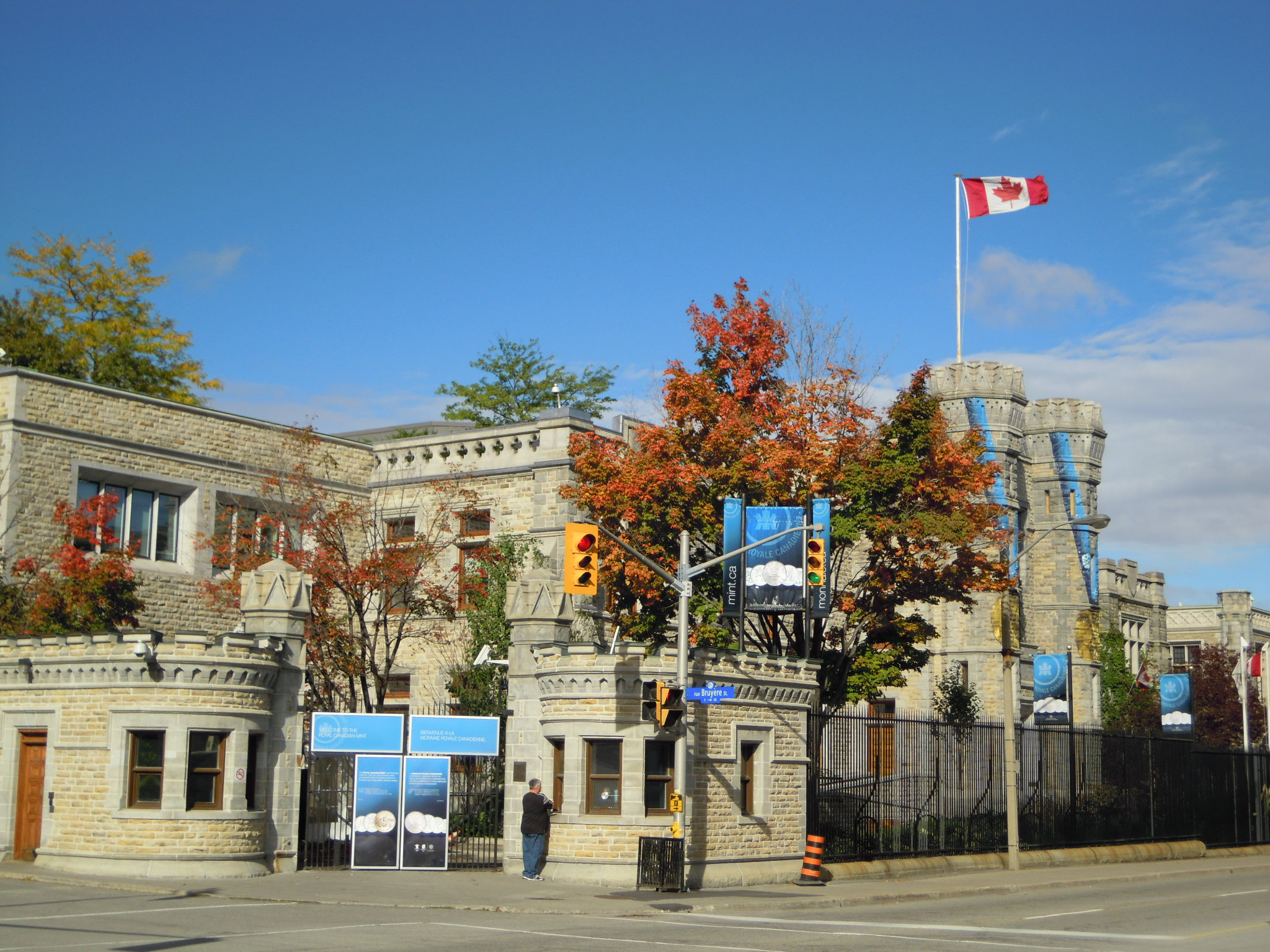
Royal Canadian Mint, Canada

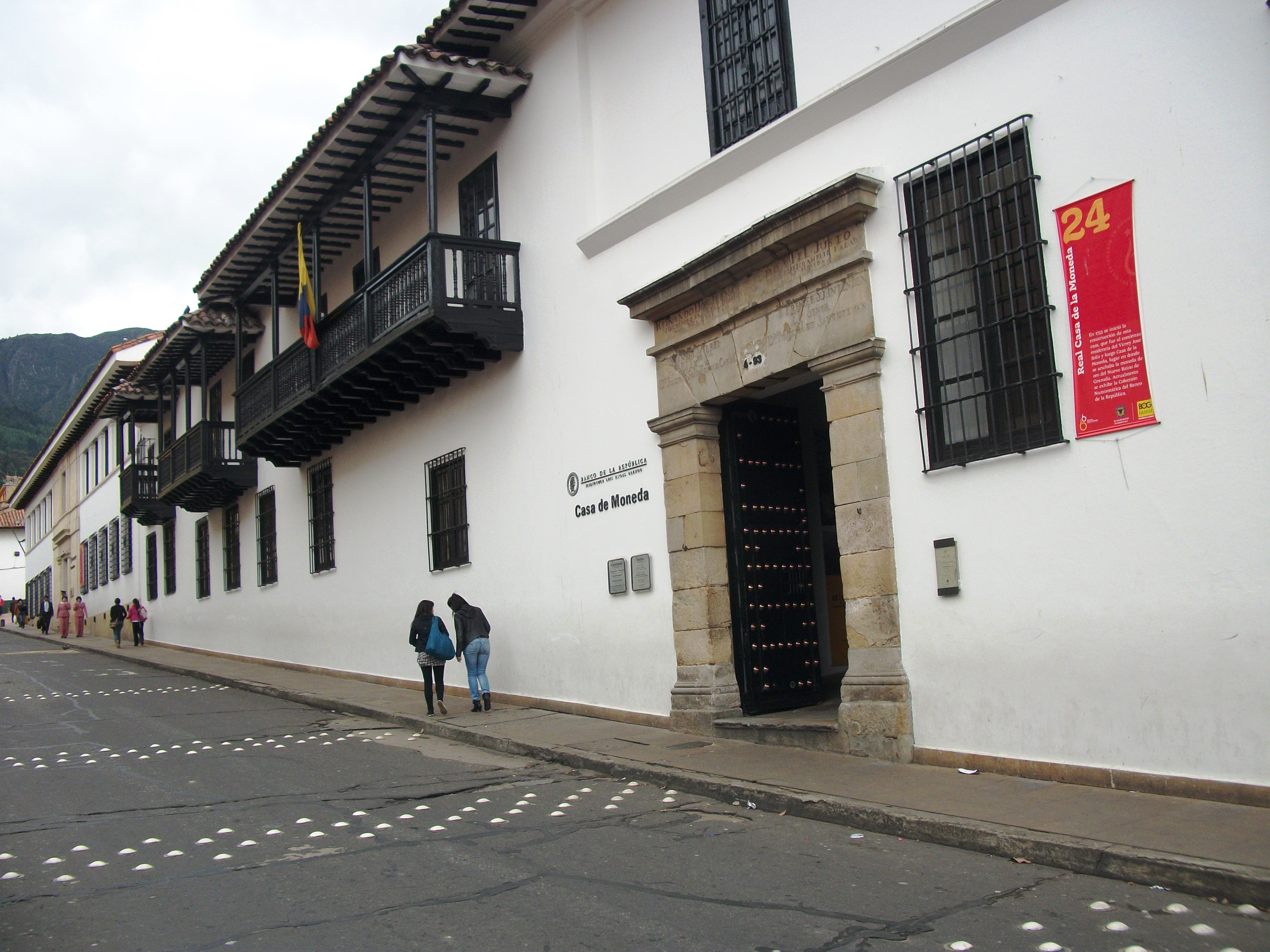
Casa de Moneda de Colombia

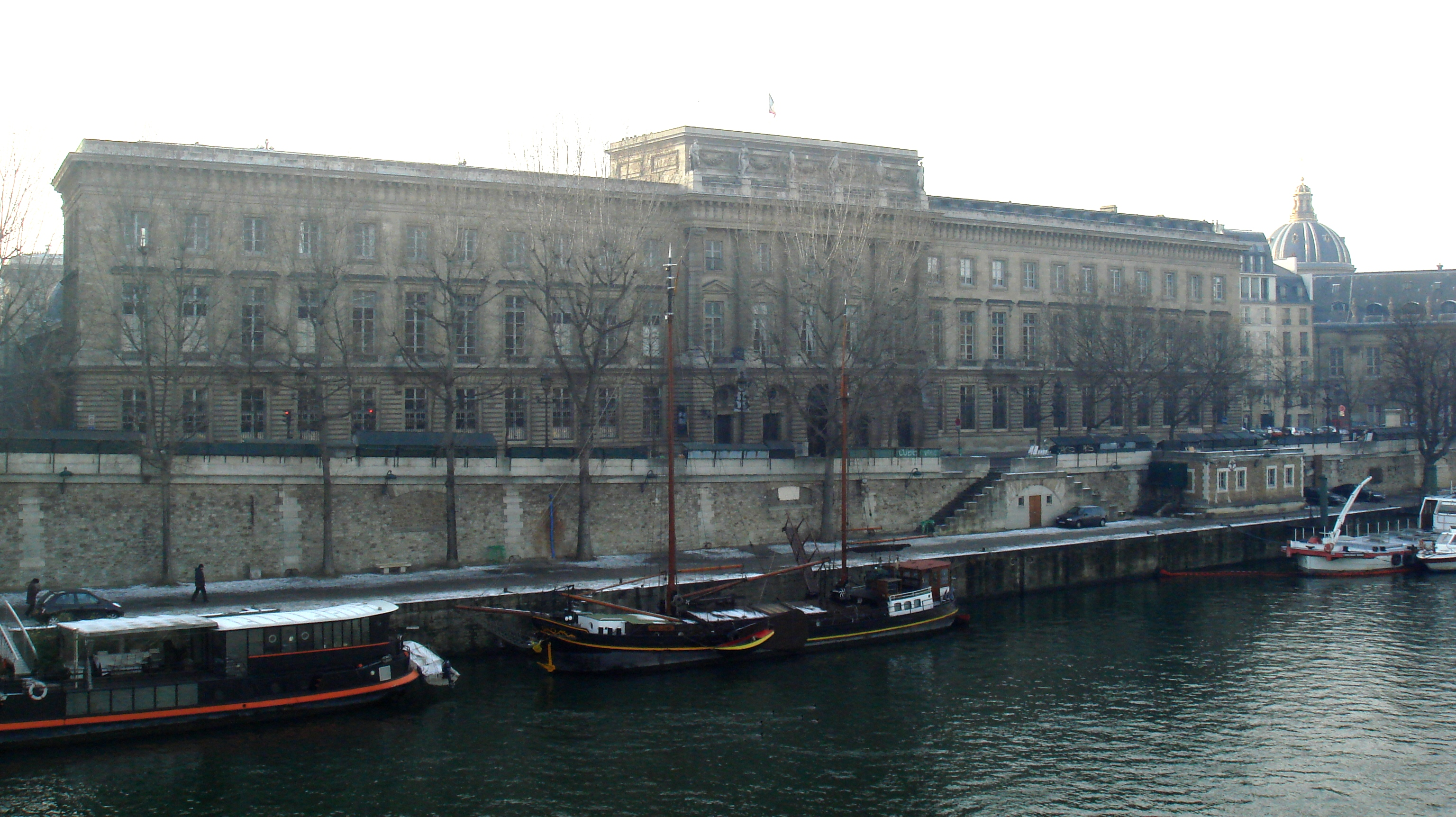
Monnaie de Paris, France

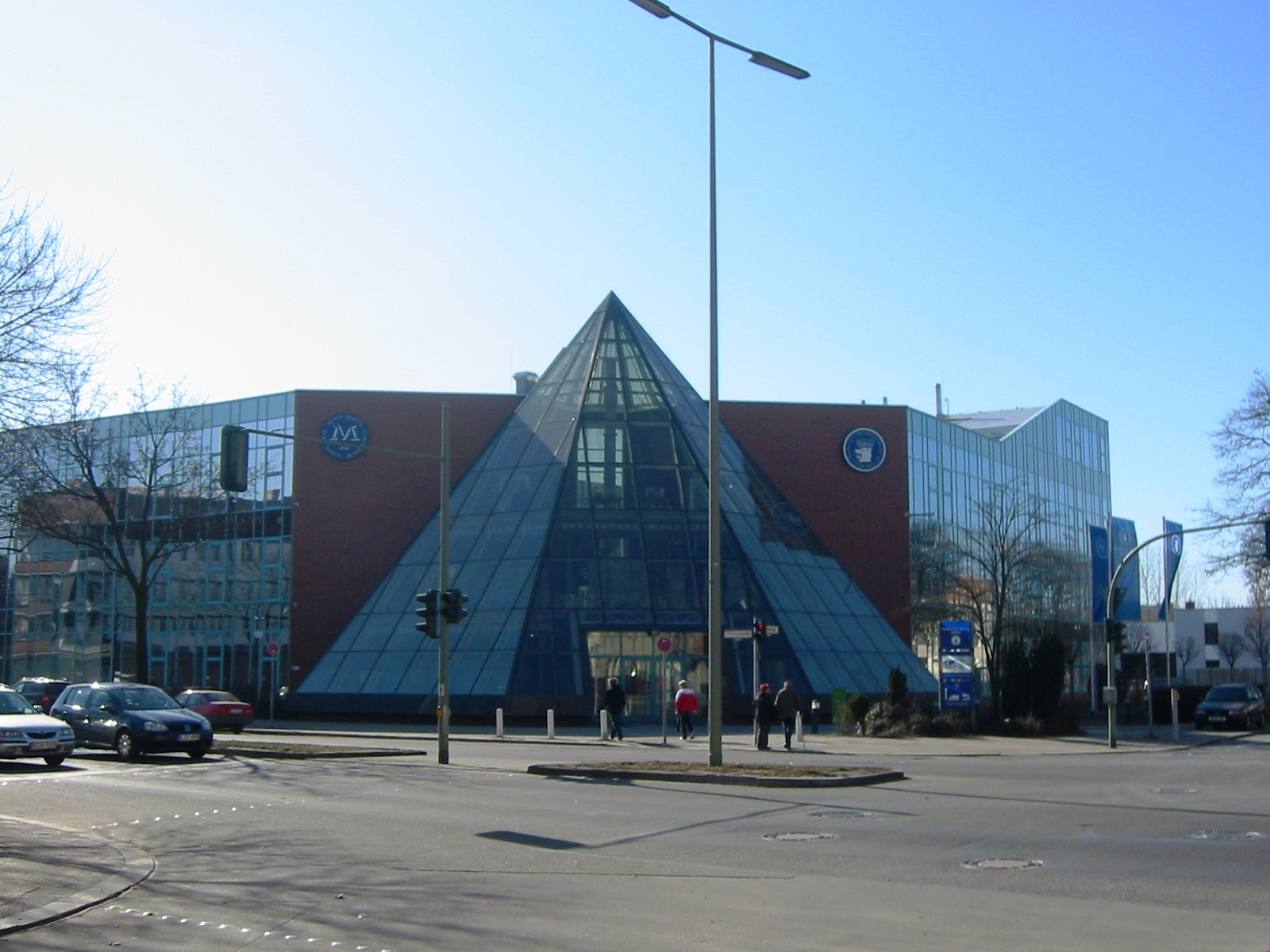
Staatliche Münze Berlin, Germany

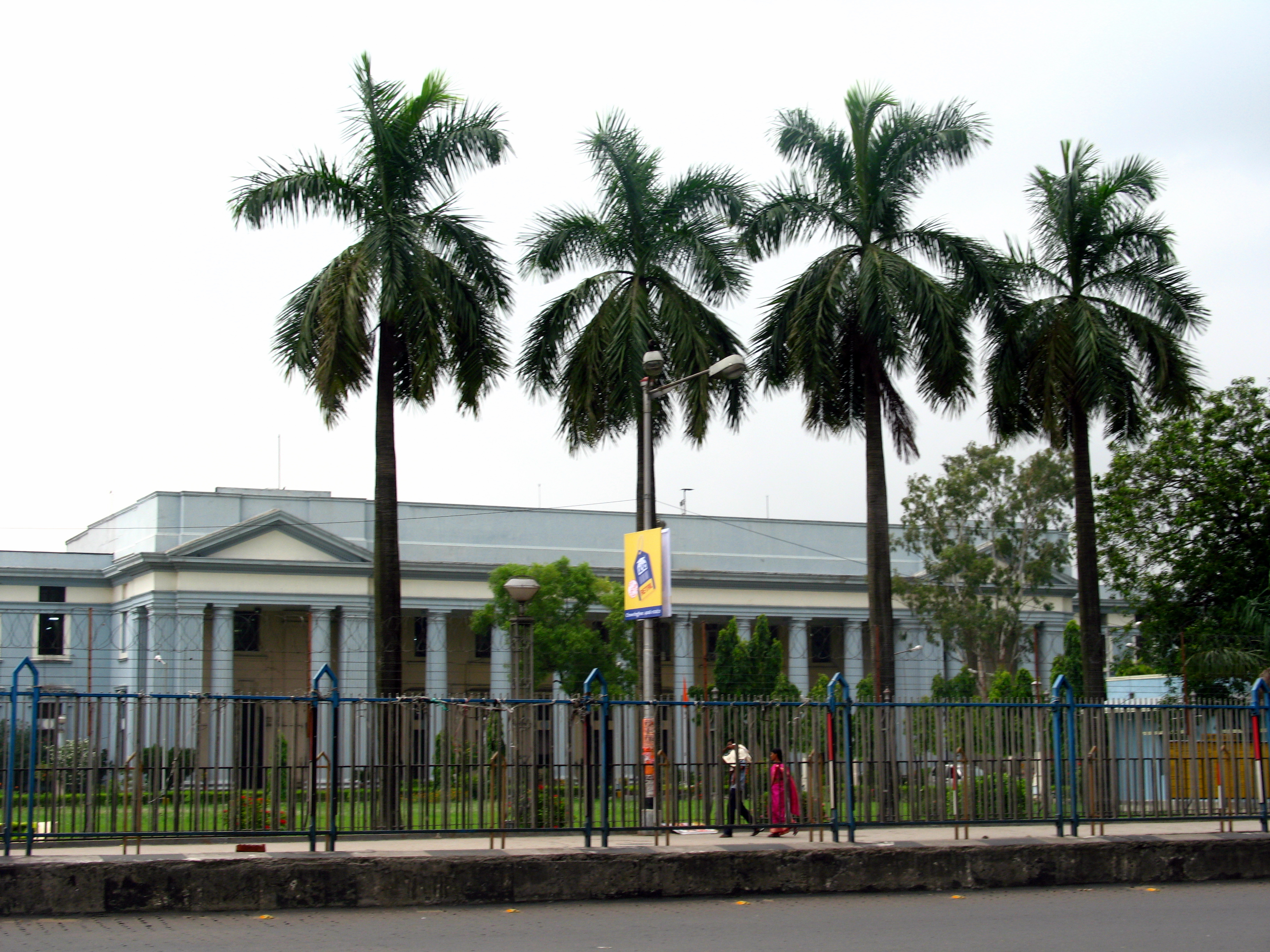
Calcutta Mint, India

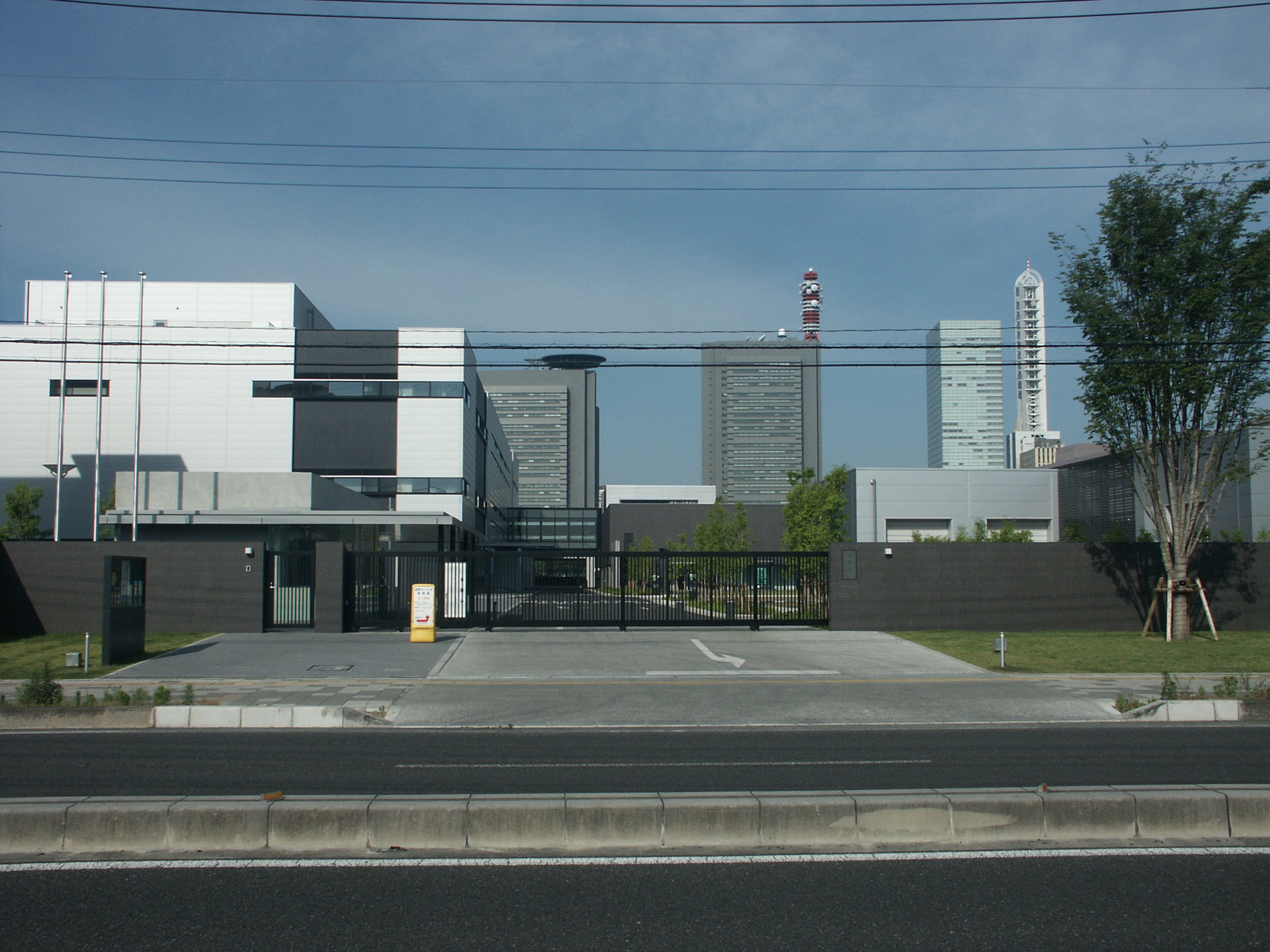
Japan Mint

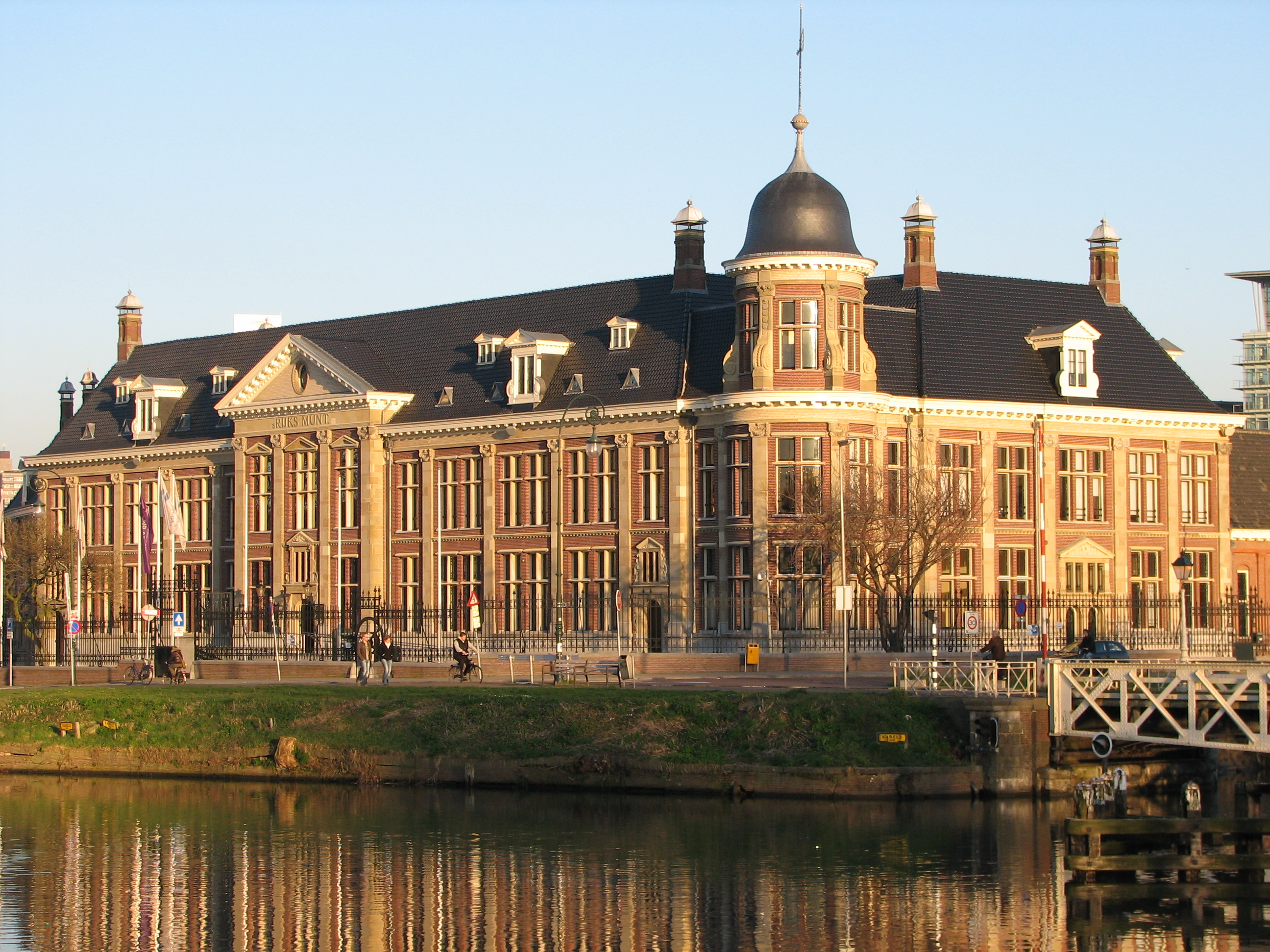
Royal Dutch Mint

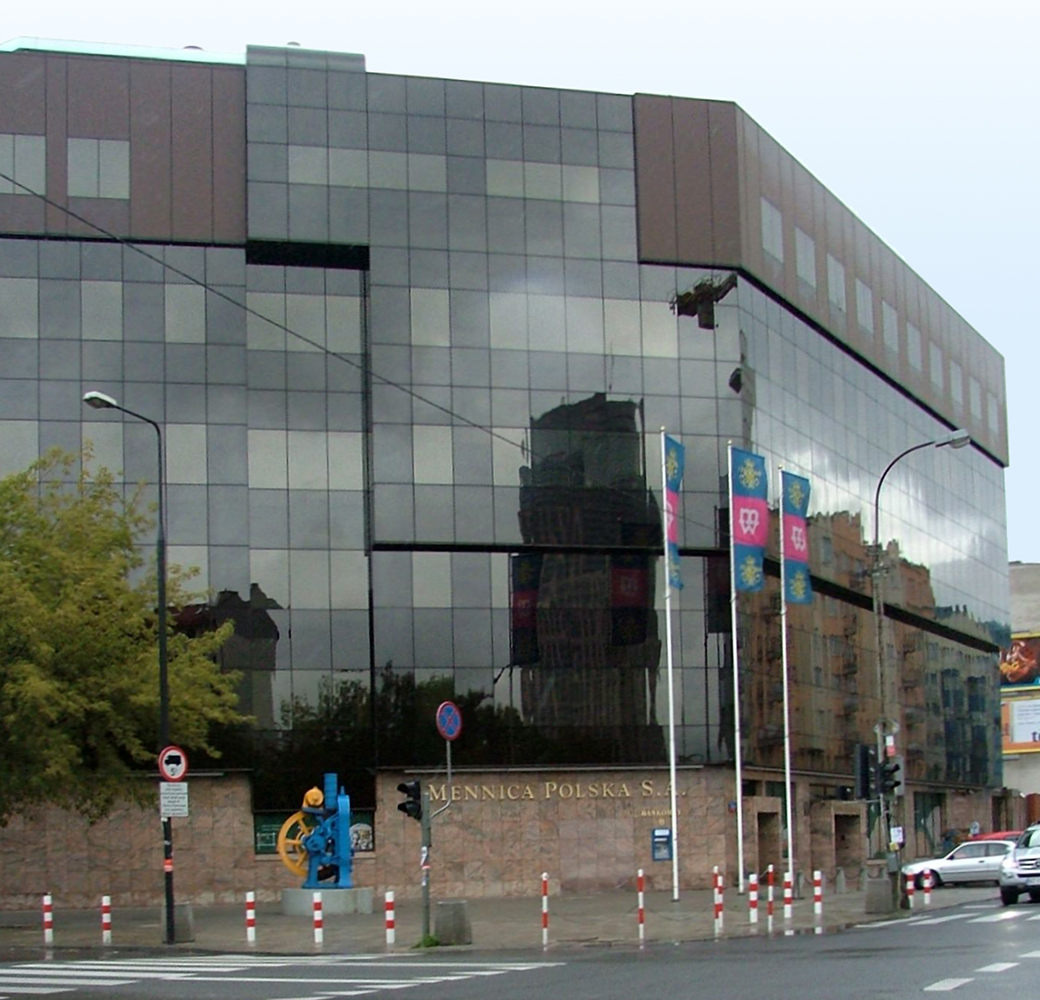
Mennica Polska S.A., Poland

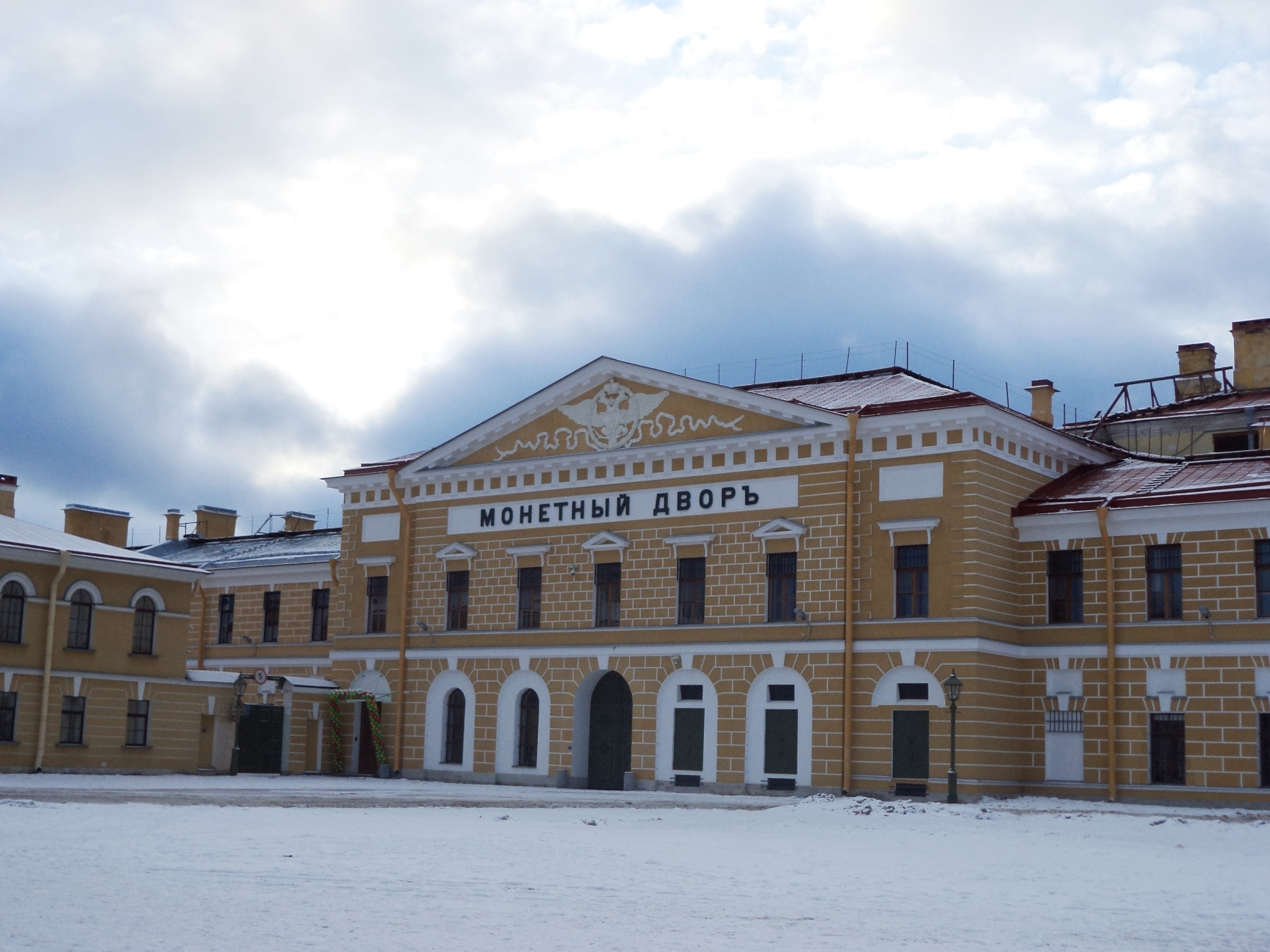
Saint Petersburg Mint, Russia

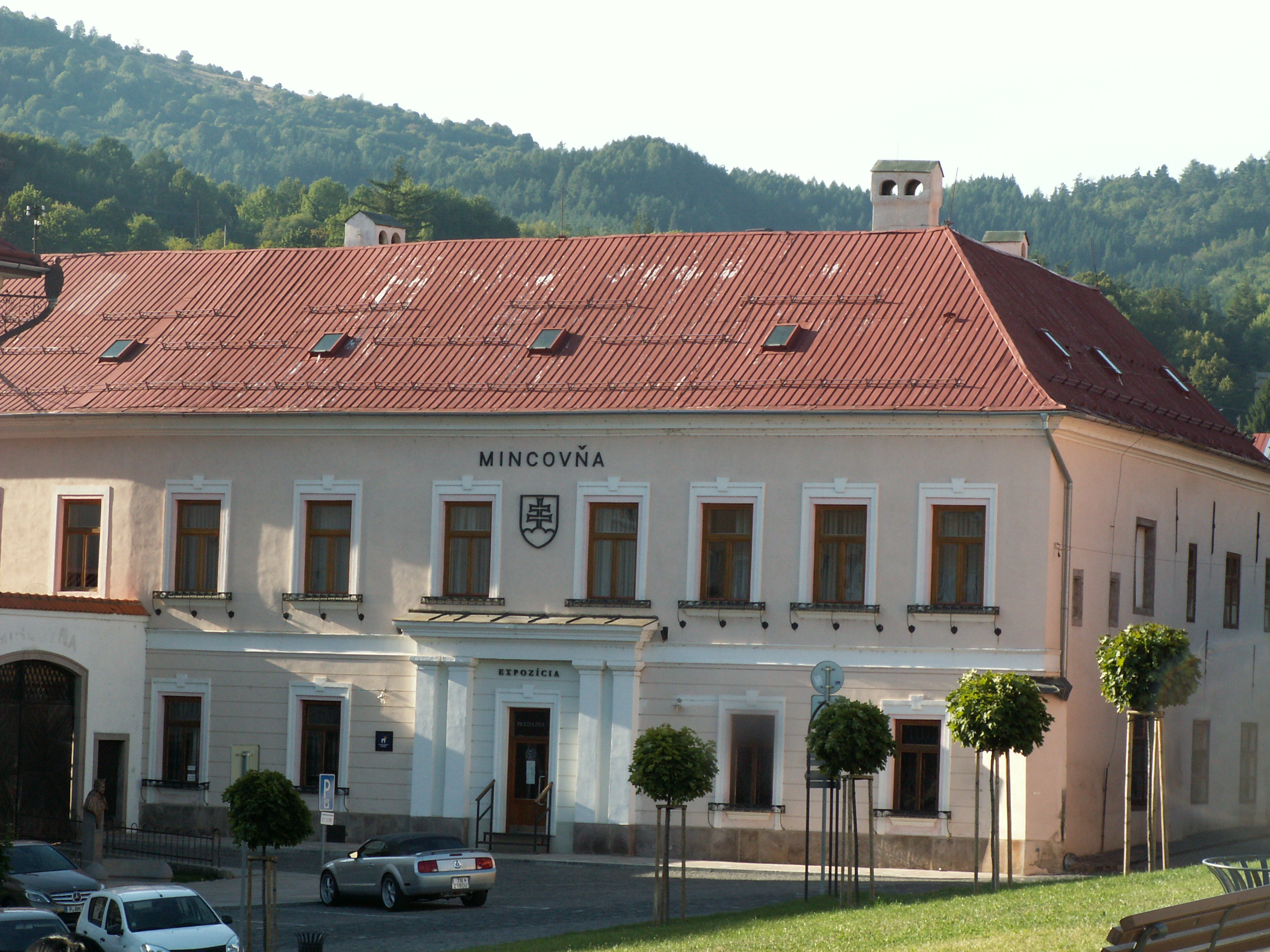
Kremnica Mint, Slovakia

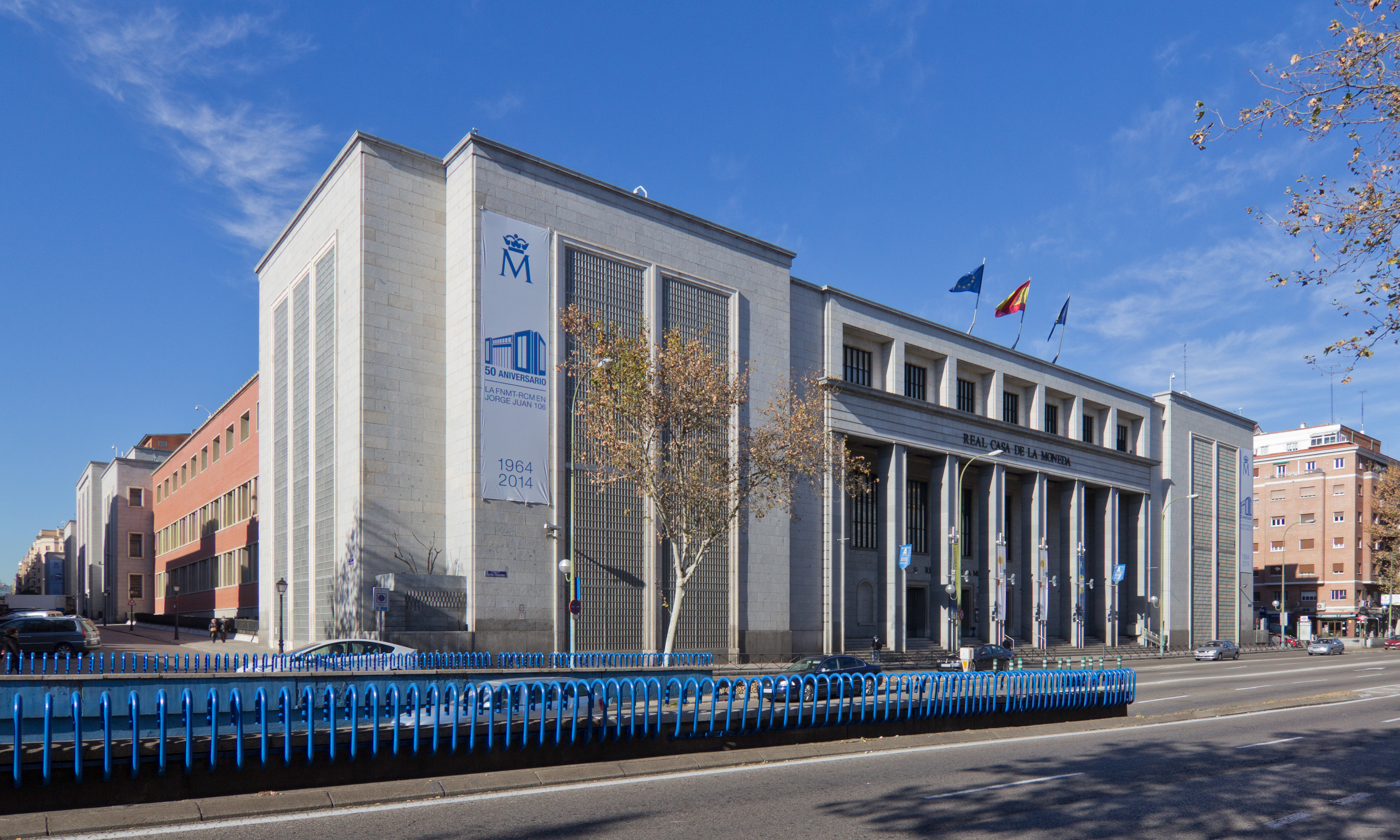
Royal Mint of Spain

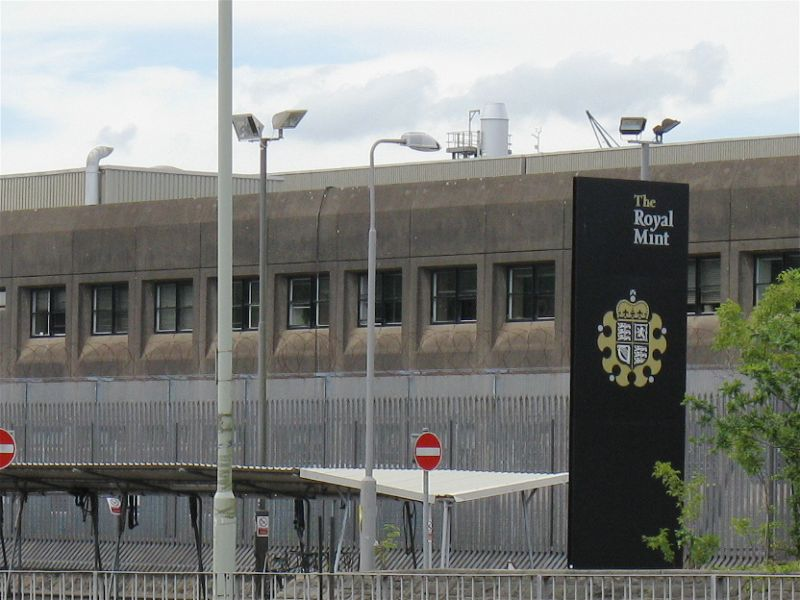
Royal Mint, United Kingdom

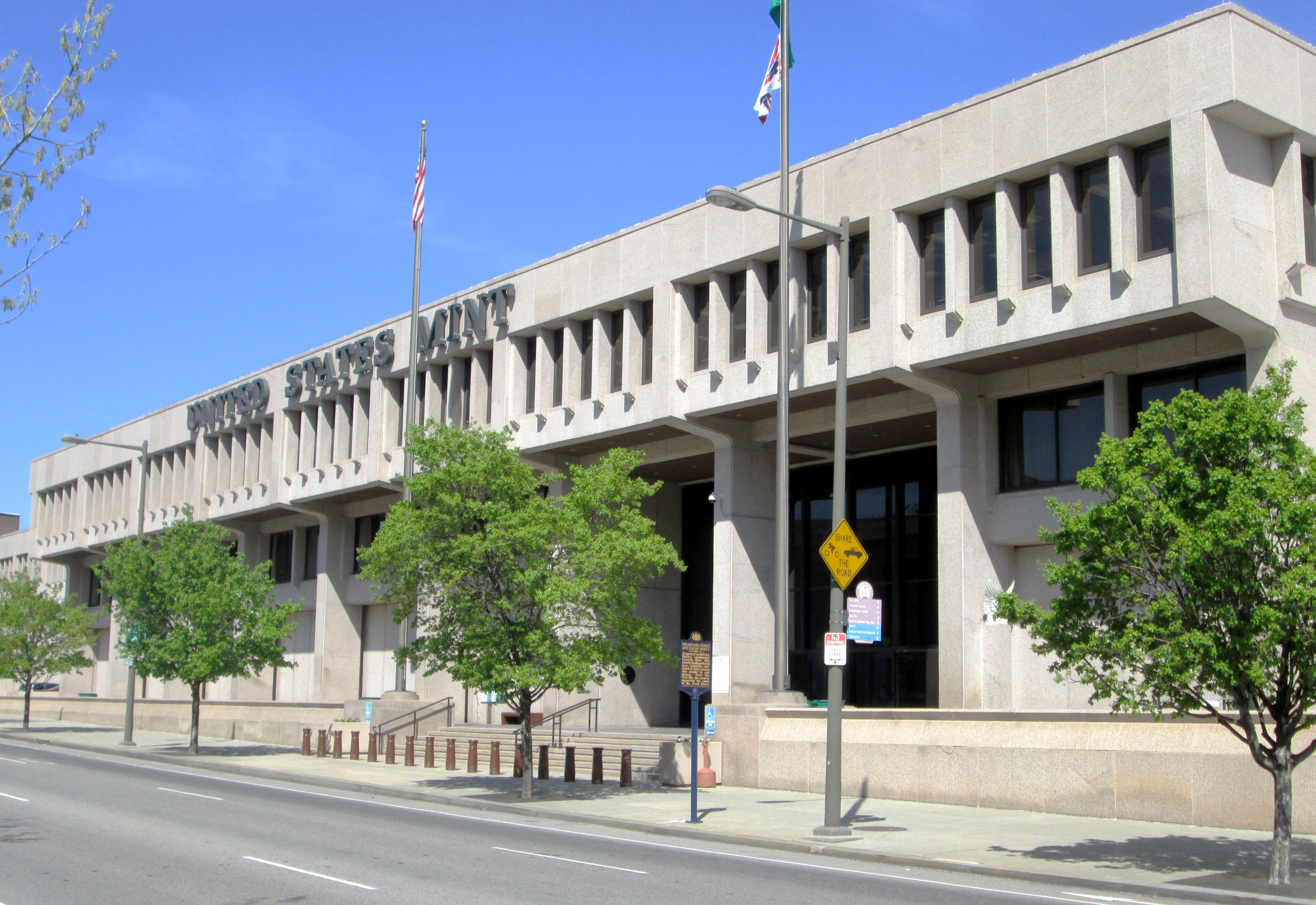
Philadelphia Mint, United States

== Currently operating mints ==
The world's oldest continuously running mint is the Monnaie de Paris in France which was founded in AD 864 and is the world's 8th oldest company. The second is the British Royal Mint, founded in AD 886 and the 10th oldest.

| Polity | Name | Year established | Ownership | Owner | Ref. |
|---|---|---|---|---|---|
| Argentina | Casa de Moneda de la Republica Argentina | 1875 | State-owned | | |
| Australia | Perth Mint | 1899 | State-owned | Government of Western Australia | |
| Australia | Royal Australian Mint | 1965 | State-owned | The Commonwealth of Australia | |
| Austria | Austrian Mint | 1194 | State-owned | National Bank of Austria | |
| Belgium | Royal Belgian Mint | 1291 | | | |
| Brazil | Casa da Moeda do Brasil | 1694 | State-owned | | |
| Bulgaria | Bulgarian Mint | 1952 | State-owned | | |
| Canada | Royal Canadian Mint | 1908 | State-owned | | |
| Chile | Casa de Moneda de Chile | 1743 | | | |
| China | China Banknote Printing and Minting Corporation | 1949 | State-owned | | |
| Colombia | Fábrica de Moneda | 1982 | State-owned | Bank of the Republic | |
| Costa Rica | Central Bank of Costa Rica | 1936 | | | |
| Croatia | Croatian Mint | 1993 | State-owned | Croatian National Bank | |
| Cyprus | Central Bank of Cyprus | 1963 | State-owned | | |
| Czech Republic | Czech Mint | 1993 | Private | Change ownership in 2009 | |
| Czech Republic | Prague Mint | 2011 | Private | | |
| Denmark | Royal Danish Mint | 1739 | | Danmarks Nationalbank | |
| Egypt | Central Bank of Egypt | 1961 | | | |
| Fiji | Reserve Bank of Fiji | 1984 | State-owned | | |
| Finland | Mint of Finland | 1860 | | | |
| France | Monnaie de Paris | 864 | | | |
| Overseas France | Institut d'émission d'Outre-Mer | 1966 | | | |
| Germany | Staatliche Münzen Baden-Württemberg | 1998 | | | |
| Germany | Bavarian Central Mint | 1158 | | | |
| Germany | Staatliche Münze Berlin | | | | |
| Germany | Hamburgische Münze | 834 | | | |
| Greece | Bank of Greece | 1927 | | | |
| Guatemala | Casa de Moneda de Guatemala | 1733 | | | |
| Hungary | Hungarian Mint | 1001 or 1328 | State-owned | Hungarian National Bank | |
| Iceland | Central Bank of Iceland | 1961 | State-owned | | |
| Iran | Security Printing and Minting Organization | 1877 | State-owned | Central Bank of Iran | |
| Iraq | Central Bank of Iraq | 1953 | | | |
| India | India Government Mint | | | | |
| Indonesia | Perum Peruri | 1971 | State-owned | Government of Indonesia | |
| Ireland | Currency Centre | 1978 | | | |
| Italy | Istituto Poligrafico e Zecca dello Stato | 1928 | | | |
| Japan | Japan Mint | 1871 | | | |
| Jordan | Central Bank of Jordan | 1964 | | | |
| Kazakhstan | Kazakhstan Mint of the National Bank of the Republic of Kazakhstan | 1992 | State-owned | National Bank of Kazakhstan | |
| Lesotho | Central Bank of Lesotho | 1978 | | | |
| Lithuania | Lithuanian Mint | 1990 | | | |
| Malaysia | Royal Mint of Malaysia | 2000 | | | |
| Mexico | Mexican Mint | 1535 | | | |
| Netherlands | Royal Dutch Mint | 1567 | | | |
| New Zealand | New Zealand Mint | 1967 | Private | | |
| Nigeria | Nigerian Security Printing and Minting Company Limited | 1963 | | Federal government of Nigeria | |
| Norway | Royal Norwegian Mint | 1686 | | Mint of Finland 50% Samlerhuset Group 50% | |
| Pakistan | Pakistan Mint | 1942 | | | |
| Peru | Casa Nacional de Moneda | 1565 | | | |
| Poland | Mennica Polska S.A. | 1766 | | | |
| Philippines | Bangko Sentral ng Pilipinas | 1993 | | | |
| Portugal | Imprensa Nacional-Casa da Moeda | 13th century | | | |
| Romania | Monetăria Statului | 1870 | State-owned | National Bank of Romania | |
| Russia | Moscow Mint | 1942 | State-owned | Government of Russia | |
| Russia | Saint Petersburg Mint | 1724 | State-owned | Government of Russia | |
| Serbia | The Institute for Manufacturing Banknotes and Coins | 1929 | | National Bank of Serbia | |
| Sierra Leone | Bank of Sierra Leone | 1963 | State-owned | | |
| Singapore | Singapore Mint | 1968 | State-owned | | |
| Slovakia | Kremnica Mint | 1328 | State-owned | | |
| South Africa | South African Mint | 1890 | | South African Reserve Bank | |
| South Korea | Korea Minting and Security Printing Corporation | 1951 | State-owned | Bank of Korea | |
| Spain | Fábrica Nacional de Moneda y Timbre (Spanish Royal Mint) | 1893 | | | |
| Switzerland | Swissmint | 1848 | | | |
| Switzerland | Pamp SA | 1977 | | | |
| Taiwan | Central Mint | 1920 | State-owned | Central Bank of the Republic of China (Taiwan) | |
| Thailand | Royal Thai Mint | 1860 | | | |
| Transnistria | Transnistrian Republican Bank | 1992 | State-owned | | |
| Turkey | Turkish State Mint | 1467 | | | |
| Ukraine | National Bank of Ukraine | 1998 | | | |
| United Kingdom | Royal Mint | 886 | State-owned | HM Treasury | |
| United Kingdom | Birmingham Mint | 1850 | Private | | |
| United Kingdom | The Commonwealth Mint | 2005 | Private | | |
| United Kingdom | Tower Mint | 1976 | Private | | |
| United States | Asahi Refining | | Private | | |
| United States | The Franklin Mint | 1964 | Private | | |
| United States | Golden State Mint | 1974 | Private | | |
| United States | Mason Mint | 2015 | Private | | |
| United States | Monarch Precious Metals | 2008 | Private | | |
| United States | The Ohio Mint | 2021 | Private | | |
| United States | Regency Mint | 1999 | Private | | |
| United States | Scottsdale Mint | 2008 | Private | | |
| United States | Sunshine Minting | 1979 | Private | | |
| United States | SilverTowne Mint | 1973 | Private | | |
| United States | United States Mint | 1792 | State-owned | United States Department of the Treasury | |
| Vatican City | Zecca | | State-owned | | |
| Venezuela | Casa de la Moneda de Venezuela | 1802 | | Central Bank of Venezuela | |
| Zimbabwe | Zimbabwean Mint | 2001 | | | |

== Historic and defunct mints ==
| Polity | Name | Year started | Year ended | Notes | Ref. |
|---|---|---|---|---|---|
| Australia | Melbourne Mint | 1872 | 1968 | Production moved to the Royal Australian Mint in Canberra | |
| Australia | Sydney Mint | 1854 | 1926 | Production moved to Melbourne & Perth Mints | |
| Austria | Hasegg Castle | 1748 | 1806 | | |
| Bolivia | National Mint of Bolivia | 1572 | 1953 | The currency of Bolivia is now minted by foreign mints | |
| Chile | La Moneda Palace | 1814 | 1929 | Now the residence of the President of Chile, production moved to the Casa de Moneda de Chile. | |
| Colombia | Casa de Moneda | 1620 | 1987 | Now a museum, production moved to the Fábrica de Moneda in Ibagué. | |
| England | Horndon mint | 1056 | | | |
| Hong Kong | Hong Kong Mint | 1866 | 1868 | | |
| Indonesia | PN Artha Yasa | 1965 | 1971 | Merged with state printer Pertjetakan Kebajoran to form Perum Peruri. | |
| Iran | Provincial mints of Iran | | 1877 | Replaced by the Zarab-khane | |
| Ireland | The Mint (Carlingford) | | | | |
| Philippines | Manila Mint | 1861 | 1945 | Became an official branch of the US Mint in 1920 and was later destroyed following the liberation of the Philippines in World War II | |
| Spain | National Mint of Xuvia | 1812 | 1868 | | |
| Scotland | Mints of Scotland | 1136 | 1709 | Following the Acts of Union 1707, the last mint in Edinburgh closed and minting was ceded to the Royal Mint | |
| Sweden | Myntverket | AD 995 | 2008 | Sold to the Mint of Finland in 2008 | |
| United Kingdom | Pobjoy Mint | 1965 | 2023 | | |
| United Kingdom | Soho Mint | 1788 | 1848 | | |
| United States | Carson City Mint | 1870 | 1893 | | |
| United States | Charlotte Mint | 1835 | 1861 | | |
| United States | Dahlonega Mint | 1838 | 1861 | | |
| United States | The Dalles Mint | 1869 | 1869 | Partly constructed in 1869, but never completed | |
| United States | Engelhard | 1868 | 1888 | Ceased production of bullion products | |
| United States | New Orleans Mint | 1838 | 1909 | | |
| Venice | Venice Mint | 1536 | 1797 | | |
