= Myntverket =

Private mint of Sweden

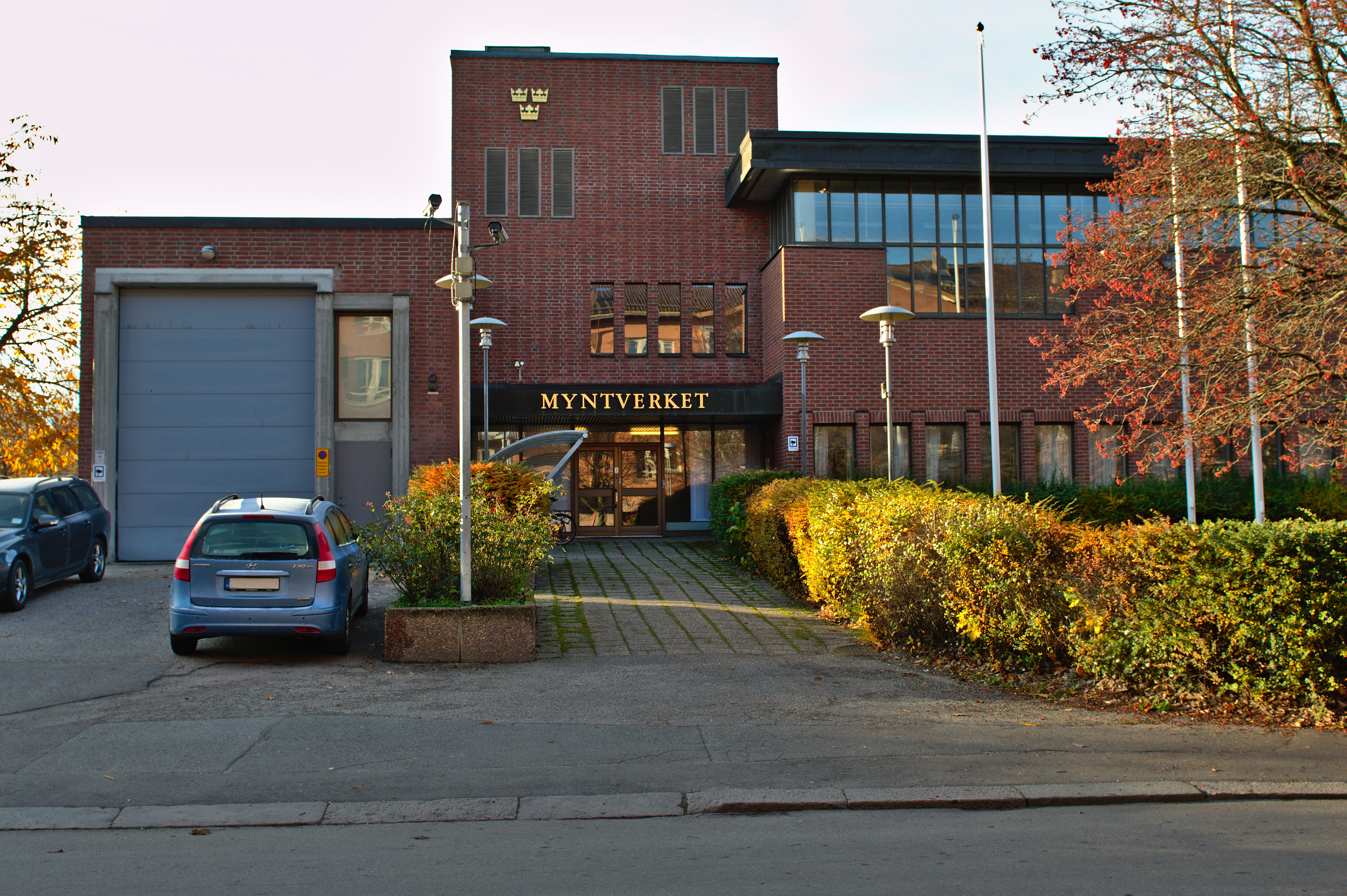
Myntverket in Eskilstuna (2014)

Myntverket (officially AB Myntverket) is a private Swedish company that produces coins and medals, including the Swedish national coins and the Nobel Prize medals. As of 2008, Swedish coins are minted by Myntverket's parent company, Mint of Finland Ltd (Swedish: Myntverket i Finland Ab, Finnish: Rahapaja Oy) in Helsinki, Finland, ending a 1,012-year history of minting Swedish coins in Sweden.

== See also ==
- List of mints
