= Zimbabwe Mint =

The Zimbabwe Mint
- Industry: Metalworking
- Founded: 2001; 25 years ago
- Headquarters: Bulawayo, Zimbabwe
- Area served: Zimbabwe
- Products: coins
- Owner: Reserve Bank of Zimbabwe
- Parent: Fidelity Printers and Refiners

The Zimbabwe Mint opened in 2001 with the intention of striking coins of Zimbabwe. It is located in Bulawayo. The Zimbabwe Mint operates under the wings of Fidelity Printers and Refinery.

From the very early days of independence, Zimbabwe took a conscious decision to create a conducive macro-economic environment, necessary for the development and advancement of industry, and the creation of wealth. The Reserve Bank of Zimbabwe participated in industrial activity in recognition of the need for it to reduce costs, wherever possible, while at the same time fulfilling its mandate.

Development work has also continued over the years, through the acquisition of technology, to produce new products and value add to its precious metals pool and, established a coin minting facility. This was another example of the Bank's participation in industry, to enable it to discharge its obligation more efficiently by supplying coin at sustainable cost. The Commissioning of the Zimbabwe Mint was therefore, an example of the many other positive developments taking place in Zimbabwe, which have, unfortunately, tended to be buried under a barrage of negative publicity.

The cooperating partners were Giesecke & Devrient for bank notes and the Bavarian State Mint for coinage.

When the Z$500 million mint was commissioned by President Robert Mugabe, it was argued that it would save the country US$50 million in foreign currency because it was costing the country 150 cents to import a 10-cent piece, for example.

The mint has six presses, which can churn out 240 million pieces a year when the country's annual demand last stood at 160 million pieces.

== Minting for other countries ==
The central bank of Zimbabwe declines to disclose whether it mints coins for other countries to sustain the factory only saying "the mint will continue to compete with other mints worldwide for business. Currency is a security item and therefore it would not be prudent to publicise any information relating to any of the mint's customers," But unconfirmed reports say the mint does business with quite a number of African and overseas countries.

== See also ==
- Banknotes of Zimbabwe
- Zimbabwean Bond Coins
- List of mints
