= Turkish State Mint =

Mint in Istanbul, Turkey

- Company type: State-owned
- Industry: Metalworking
- Founded: 1467; 559 years ago
- Headquarters: Istanbul
- Area served: Turkey
- Products: coins
- Parent: Ministry of Treasury and Finance
- Website: www.darphane.gov.tr

The Turkish State Mint (Turkish: Darphane) is a state-owned mint situated in Istanbul that is responsible for minting the coinage of Turkey. Originally founded in 1467, the mint replaced the Constantinople Mint as the largest mint of the Ottoman Empire to become its successor. Mention of the mint's establishment was recorded in the documents of Mehmed the Conqueror.

== See also ==
- List of mints
- Central Bank of the Republic of Turkey
