= Mühlbauer =

Mühlbauer or Muehlbauer or Muhlbauer is a German language occupational surname for a "mill builder" and may refer to:

- Anke Mühlbauer (1968), German diver
- Beatriz Futuro Muhlbauer (born 1986), Brazilian rugby sevens player
- Dan Muhlbauer (1958–2020), American politician
- Dave Muhlbauer (born 1983 or 1984), American politician
- Holger Mühlbauer (born 1964), German jurist and writer
- Louis Muhlbauer (1929–1997), American politician
- Sepp Mühlbauer (1904–1995), Swiss ski jumper
