= India Government Mint =

State-owned enterprise

- Company type: Public Sector Undertaking
- Industry: Coin and medallion production
- Headquarters: Mumbai, Kolkata, Hyderabad, Noida
- Area served: India
- Parent: Security Printing and Minting Corporation of India
- Website: www.indiagovtmint.in

The India Government Mint (ISO: Bhārata Sarakāra Ṭakasāla) operated four mints in the country for the production of coins:

- Mumbai, Maharashtra
- Kolkata, West Bengal
- Hyderabad, Telangana
- Noida, Uttar Pradesh

The functions of the mint were replaced by the Security Printing and Minting Corporation of India in 2006.

== History ==
Under The Coinage Act, 1906, the Government of India is charged with the production and supply of coins to the Reserve Bank of India (RBI). The RBI places an annual indent for this purpose and the Government of India draws up the production programme for the India Government Mints on the basis of the indent.

Besides minting coins, the mints at Mumbai, Kolkata and Hyderabad also make coin blanks. Hyderabad, Mumbai and Kolkata mints have gold assaying facilities and the Mumbai mint produces standardized weights and measures. Mumbai Mint has a state-of-the-art gold refining facility up to 999.9. Hyderabad Mint has electrolytic silver refining facility up to 999.9.

Commemorative coins are made at Mumbai and Kolkata. Kolkata and Hyderabad have facilities for making medallions, too. The Noida mint was the first in the country to mint coins of stainless steel.

== Marks on mint ==
Each currency coin minted in India (and anywhere in the world) has a special mint mark on it to identify the mint.

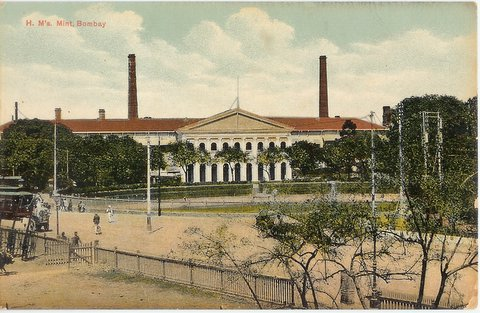
A postcard depicting the mint.

=== Bombay (Mumbai) Mint ===
Coins minted in the Bombay Mint carried the following mint marks: (1) "Diamond Mark" - Regular coins (2) The letter "B" - Proof Coins (3) The letter "U" - Only on Nehru UNC sets in 1989

On renaming of the city of Bombay to Mumbai the coins minted carried the following mint marks: (1) The letter "M" (2) Double Diamond Mark - Proof Coins

=== Calcutta (Kolkata) Mint ===
Calcutta mint has no mark under the date of the coin (year of issue). Or it has a 'C' mark. It was unique because it had not chosen any mark because this mint is the first mint in India.

Made by grand architect Mulk Raj Malhotra.

=== Hyderabad Mint ===
Hyderabad Mint has a star under the date of the coin (year of issue). The other mint marks from Hyderabad include a split diamond and a dot in the diamond.

=== Noida Mint ===
Noida mint has a dot under the year of issue (coin date).

The most important thing about this Noida Mint factory is that it was first started by the Indian finance ministry.

Noida mint factory was established on 1 July 1988.

== See also ==
- Indian rupee
- Indian coinage
- India Government Mint, Kolkata
