= SICPA =

Swiss security ink company

- Type: SA
- Industry: Security printing
- Founded: 16 July 1930; 96 years ago
- Founder: Maurice Amon
- Headquarters: Prilly, Switzerland
- Products: Security inks, track and trace technology
- Revenue: .5 to 1.5 billion Francs (estimate)
- Number of employees: ca. 3500
- Parent: 75
- Website: sicpa.com

SICPA (acronym for the former name Société Industrielle et Commerciale de Produits Alimentaires, no longer in use) is a Swiss company that provides Security printing-security inks for currencies and sensitive documents, including identity documents, passports, transport and lottery tickets. According to the Counterfeiting Intelligence Bureau's International Anti-Counterfeiting Directory, SICPA provides more than 85% of the world's currency inks. The company is also involved in the market for the secure traceability of products subject to excise duties, such as fuel, alcohol and tobacco, and regulated products, such as halal products.

A highly secretive company, SICPA employs roughly 3,000 employees and has offices and manufacturing sites in 30 countries worldwide.

== History ==
=== Beginnings ===
The company was founded in 1927 by Maurice Amon (1880–1959) in Lausanne to sell Swiss agricultural products, at that time primarily milk and cream, after Amon invented a new type of milking grease that facilitated the milking process. SICPA quickly moved to inks for printers to serve the growing demand driven by the rapid development of the graphic arts sector in the Lausanne region during the 1930s.

After World War II, Maurice Amon's sons Albert (1916–2010) and Salvador (1912–1993) directed the company towards sophisticated inks with characteristics that deter counterfeiting. In 1948, the Spanish 100 Peseta note was the first in the world to be printed using SICPA's security ink.

In 1952, SICPA established a joint venture in Lausanne with Gualtiero Giori, an Italian printing specialist. In 1965, Giori founded a company with a British competitor firm, De La Rue, the world's oldest printer of banknotes.

In 1969, SICPA’s development of standardized security inks for banknotes, supported by the Institute of Criminology of the University of Lausanne, received approval from Interpol.

=== Worldwide expansion ===
Since then, the company has extended its worldwide market reach. In 1982, the company won a contract from the US Bureau of Engraving and Printing to provide the ink for the US Dollar. In 1987, the first bank note using OVI colour-changing ink was issued in Thailand. The firm also supplied the inks for the new Euro notes in 2002.

That same year, SICPA acquired the security ink segment of American company Flint Ink.

In 2006, SICPA introduced its new generation of banknote security technology.

SICPA's factory relocated to Chavornay in 1990.

The company underwent restructuring in 1996 following a failed investment in Australia. As a result, two Swiss banks, the Société de banque suisse (SBS) et la Banque cantonale vaudoise (BCV), took partial control of the firm, Albert Amon retired, and his sons Philippe and Maurice joined the board of directors.

In 2001, SICPA entered the market for authentication and traceability solutions through the launch of a "Product Safety" division, offering anti-counterfeit solutions and improving the collection of taxes on products such as tobacco, alcohol and currently also Medical cannabis.

Three years later, in 2004, the first track and trace contract was signed with the government of Malaysia. Other contracts were signed for tobacco tracing in California (2005) and Massachusetts (2010), Brazil (2007 and 2010 for beer and tobacco), Turkey (2007), Morocco (2010) and Kenya (2013).

SICPA also used to be active in the production of packaging inks, but sold that business to German company Siegwerk in 2005 for an undisclosed amount. The acquisition made Siegwerk the second largest manufacturer of packaging ink in the world.

SICPA acquired the production unit of Italian company Olivetti I-Jet in 2014, after having already purchased the R&D unit the year before. It is also present in Ecuador. Also in 2014, SICPA acquired Cabot Security Materials Inc., based out of Albuquerque, New Mexico.

With cannabis becoming legal in several US states for medical purposes, SICPA introduced its cannabis tracking program to the US, notably in California.

=== Diversification of Business Activities ===
==== Switzerland ====
In June 2023, SICPA launched the Unlimitrust Campus near its corporate headquarters in Prilly, Switzerland as a hub for regional industry actors to collaborate and develop new security solutions and technologies. In November 2023, Unlimitrust Campus officially joined the seven other technopoles in Vaud under the umbrella of the canton’s innovation and investment promotion agency, Innovaud. Unlimitrust Campus currently hosts cybersecurity and artificial intelligence companies such as Approach Cyber, Aica, Ruag, Effixis and Visium.

Worldwide

SICPA entered the fuel marking market in 2016, with its solution used by governments worldwide to address fuel fraud, adulteration and smuggling. In 2024, the company became the global leader in fuel marking.

In recent years, SICPA has entered the digital security sector, employing researchers in countries including Switzerland, Morocco and Malaysia to develop its cyber, digital identity and digital transactions security activities.

== Organization ==
=== Key figures ===
A secretive company, SICPA does not publicly communicate its business figures (number of employees, offices, location of the latter etc.). However, the firm's turnover was estimated to be $750 million in 2003. Its employees are estimated to have increased from 1,100 to 3,000 between 2007 and 2013 due to several acquisitions, 400 of which work at the company headquarters in Prilly. Resulting from internal reshuffling of two of its tracing business units, an estimated 100 employees have been made redundant since 2014. A "reorganization plan" affected 150 employees in 2017.

=== Governance ===
From 2000 to 2003, Jean Daloglou was the CEO of the group. From 2003 to 2005 the position was held by Jan Secher. SICPA is now owned and managed by Philippe Amon, his brother Maurice Amon having left the company.

=== Business segments ===
The company's activities are divided into three main segments:

- Inks and security technologies are the historical core business of the company, and focus on banknotes, ID documents, postage stamps, security labels, etc. The firm cooperates with the central banks of most countries.
- The company offers product and brand protection solutions and services to over 15 industries, including pharmaceuticals, agrochemicals and luxury goods, to ensure supply chain integrity. This includes integrated and multi-layer authentication solutions, burglar-proof solutions as well as identification and traceability solutions.
- The company has been providing integrated security solutions for governments since 2004. Secure traceability consists in providing a secure stamp or affixing a direct mark on products subject to excise duties, such as tobacco, alcohol or oil, as well as soft drinks and cosmetics. This enables countries to combat tax evasion and smuggling, and plays a role in public health considerations. SICPA has developed a set of multilayer or multi-level security solutions that integrate visible and invisible physical security, and digital security with serialization (SICPATRACE).

Every year, over 100 billion products worldwide are marked with SICPA inks.

== Controversies ==
A highly secretive company, SICPA has been regularly quoted by both media and politicians for either potential corruption practices (Brazil, Kenya and Morocco) or some of its lobbying practices (France, Ecuador). In April 2023, the Swiss federal prosecutor’s office fined the company CHF1 million, along with a CHF80 million compensation of benefits made in Latin America because of "identified organisational deficiencies" that did not prevent employees of Sicpa from bribing officials in foreign countries.

=== Brazil ===
In 2015, the company was accused in Brazil in an investigation by the federal police concerning the conditions under which it was awarded the contract by Casa da Moeda. Charles Nelson Finkel, reportedly paid bribes of $32 million to finance ministry officials to secure the contract worth several billion euros. Casa da Moeda later elaborated on the contract award conditions in a note detailing the tendering procedure and the contract with SICPA was canceled. SICPA claims to have committed no irregularities and to be cooperating fully with the authorities.

In June 2022, the Brazilian justice system overturned Finkel’s 2019 conviction, acquitting him of corruption charges. The Brazilian government continues to work with the company, particularly for the tracing of tobacco products (SCORPIOS contract), which was extended in 2017.

=== Kenya ===
In 2016, SICPA was criticized in Kenya for the way it obtained a public contract in 2012. Raila Odinga, former Prime Minister of Kenya, accused SICPA of "illegally obtaining a contract for more than one 100 million Swiss francs from the Nairobi Finance Department (Kenya Revenue Authority, KRA)." La Tribune de Genève also reports that according to the Kenyan press SICPA "had obtained the contract well before it was added into the Kenyan trade register. It also did not meet the authorities' criteria." However, the Swiss newspaper also points out that "there is no document to support a possible malpractice in Kenya [and that] KRA is very satisfied with the services provided by SICPA".

In a parliamentary hearing, Maurice Juma, director of Kenya's Public Procurement Oversight Authority (PPOA), said that "Under the procurement law, the contract was processed through fraudulent means and it cannot be sustained".

In 2018, Kenya's High Court ruled that the Kenya Revenue Authority (KRA) had not adequately followed constitutional provisions. The contract the KRA had with SICPA for the supply of the duty stamps was annulled; however, KRA appealed the ruling and on 11 May received permission to continue the implementation of the excise goods system. In November 2023, Kenya’s Court of Appeal overturned the High Court decision which had nullified the KRA tender awarded to SICPA in 2013.
