= India Government Mint, Kolkata =

Indian mint established in 1757

Coordinates: 22°30′56.49″N 88°19′11.03″E

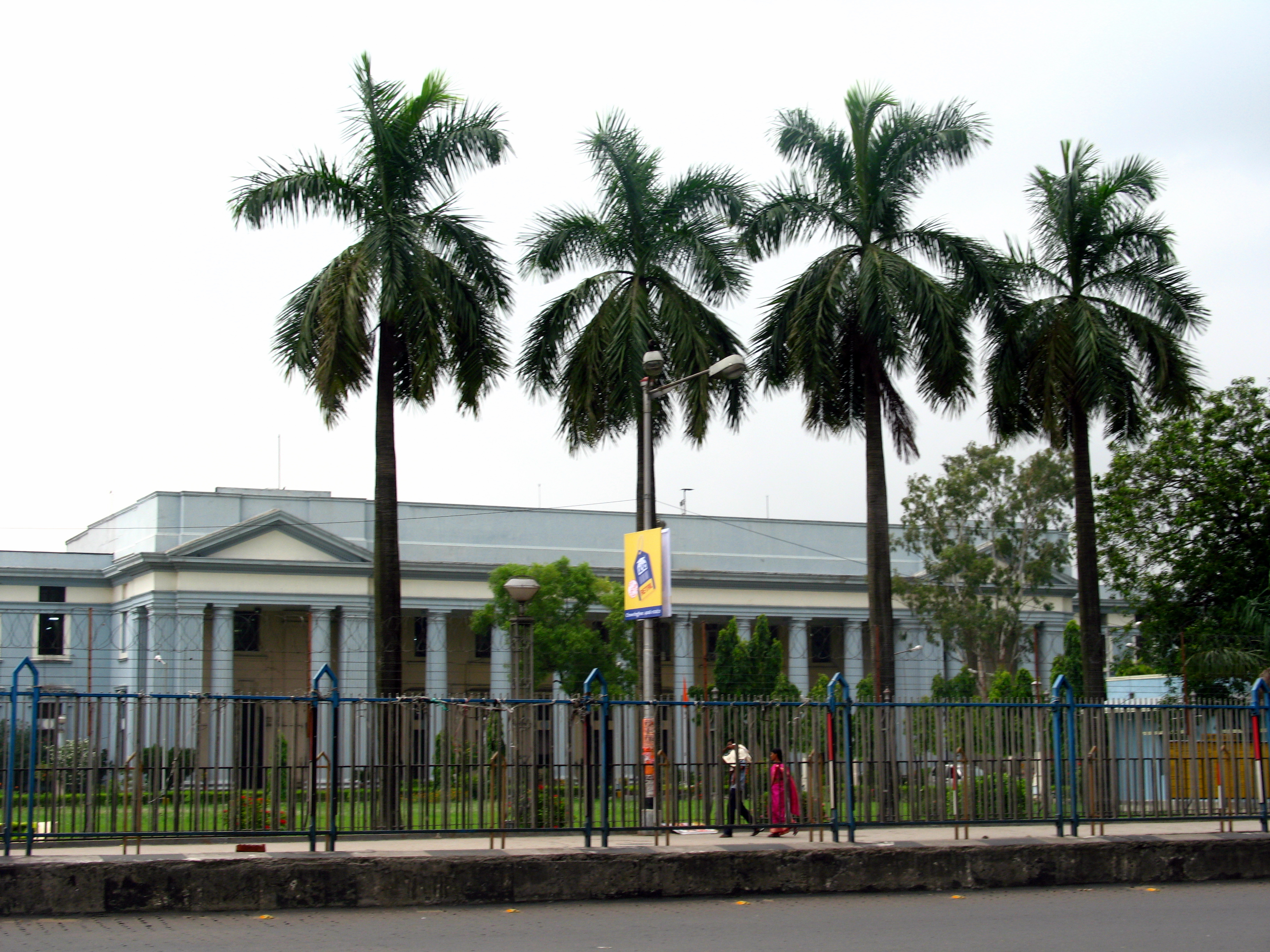
- Type: Public sector
- Industry: Mint
- Founded: 1757; 269 years ago
- Headquarters: Kolkata, West Bengal, India
- Key people: Gorakhnath Yadav (Chief General Manager & HOD)
- Products: Currency, Medallions
- Website: igmkolkata.spmcil.com

Indian rupee minted at Calcutta mint (1905).
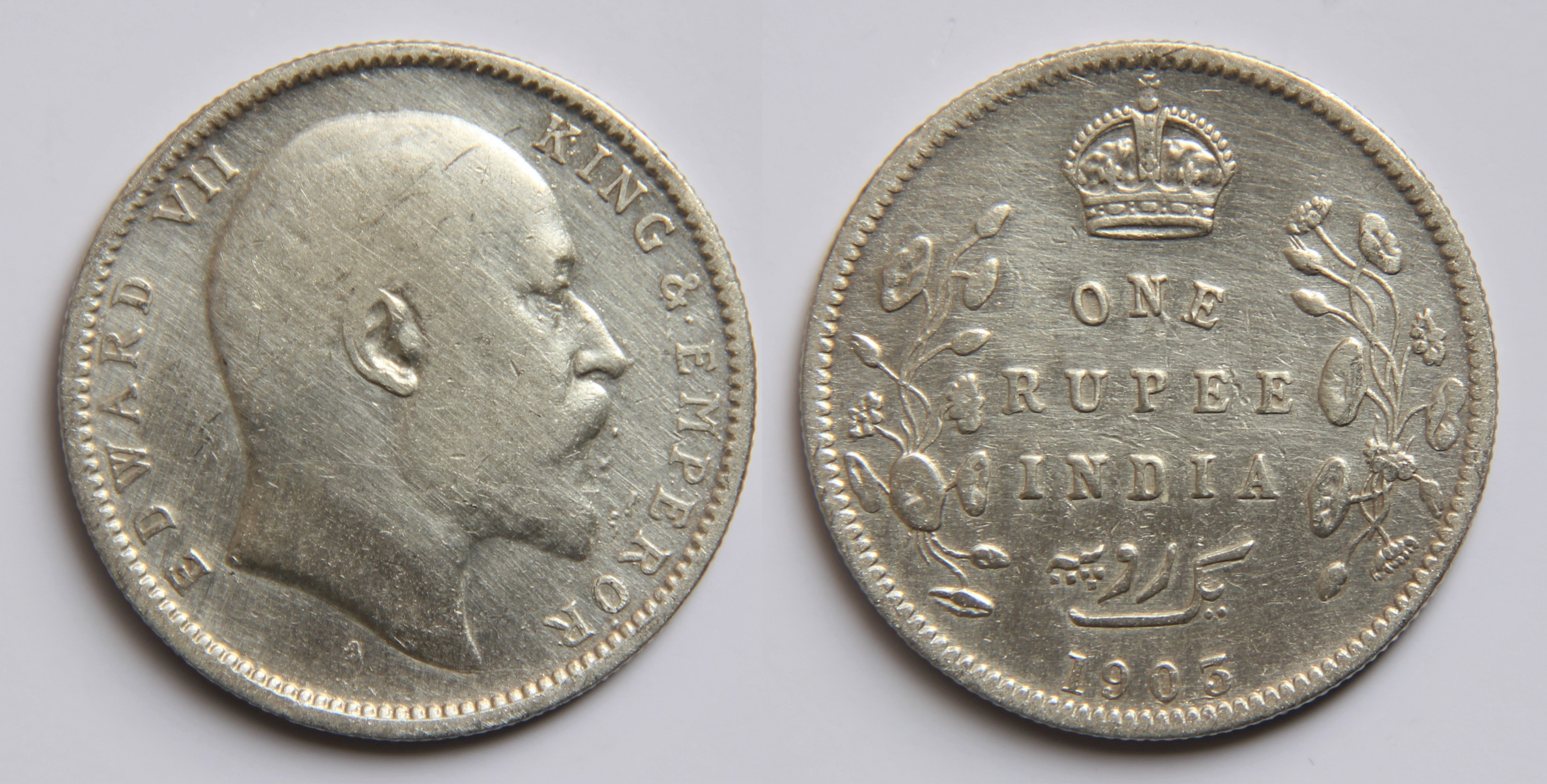
First side of the image: Obverse: Bust of Edward VII surrounded by his name.
Second side of the image: Reverse: Face value, country and date. Spray of lotus flowers on each side and a crown above.
Made of 91.7% silver. This particular coin was minted at Kolkata mint since letter "B" (in small) is missing from the crown which indicated that the coin was minted in Mumbai and absence of which tells that coin was minted in Kolkata.

The India Government Mint, Kolkata was first established in 1757, and was located in a building next to the Black Hole in the old fort – where the GPO (General Post Office) stands today. It was called the Calcutta Mint and used to produce coins with the mint name Murshidabad.

== Second mint ==
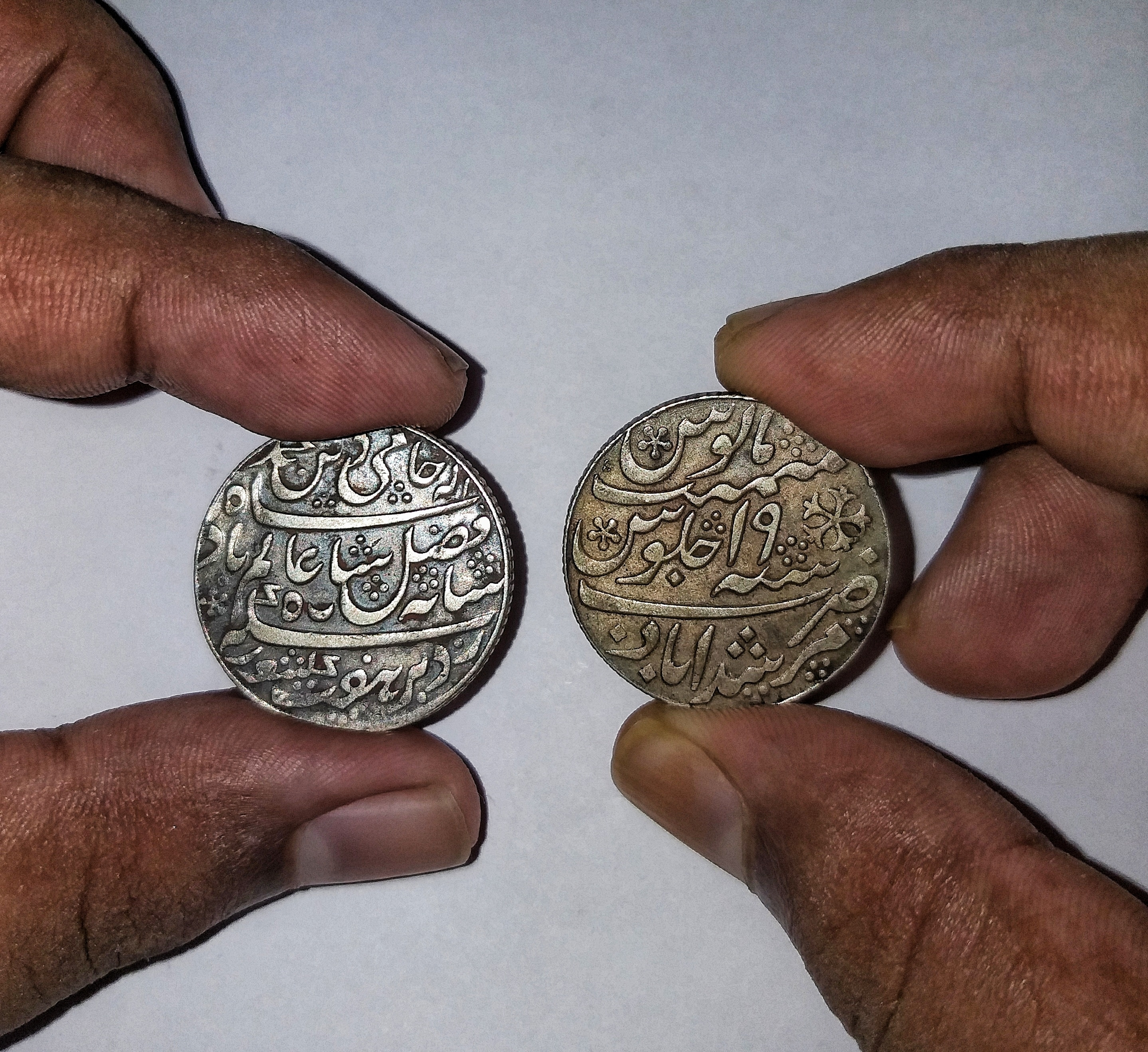
Two silver rupee coins from the Bengal Presidency, during the reign of Shah Alam II in Company Raj, minted in old Calcutta Mint.

The second Calcutta Mint was established with the modern machinery brought in 1790 from England. It was located at the site of Gillet Ship building Establishment, which had been taken over by the Stamp and Stationary Committee in 1833. The coins issued from this mint continued to bear mint name Murshidabad.

== Third mint ==
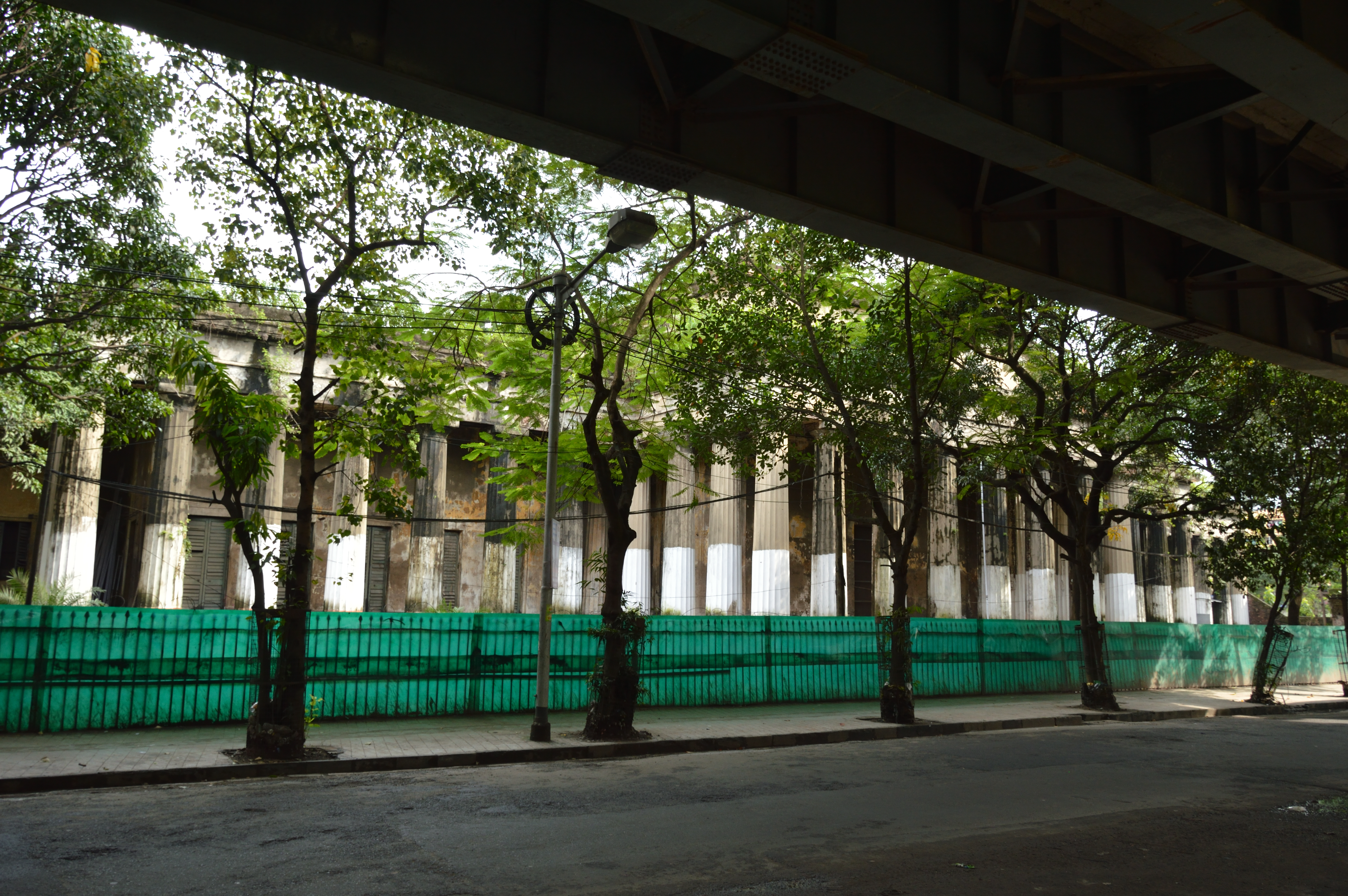
The Old Silver Mint house at 60 Strand road, Kolkata, now occupied by the CRPF.

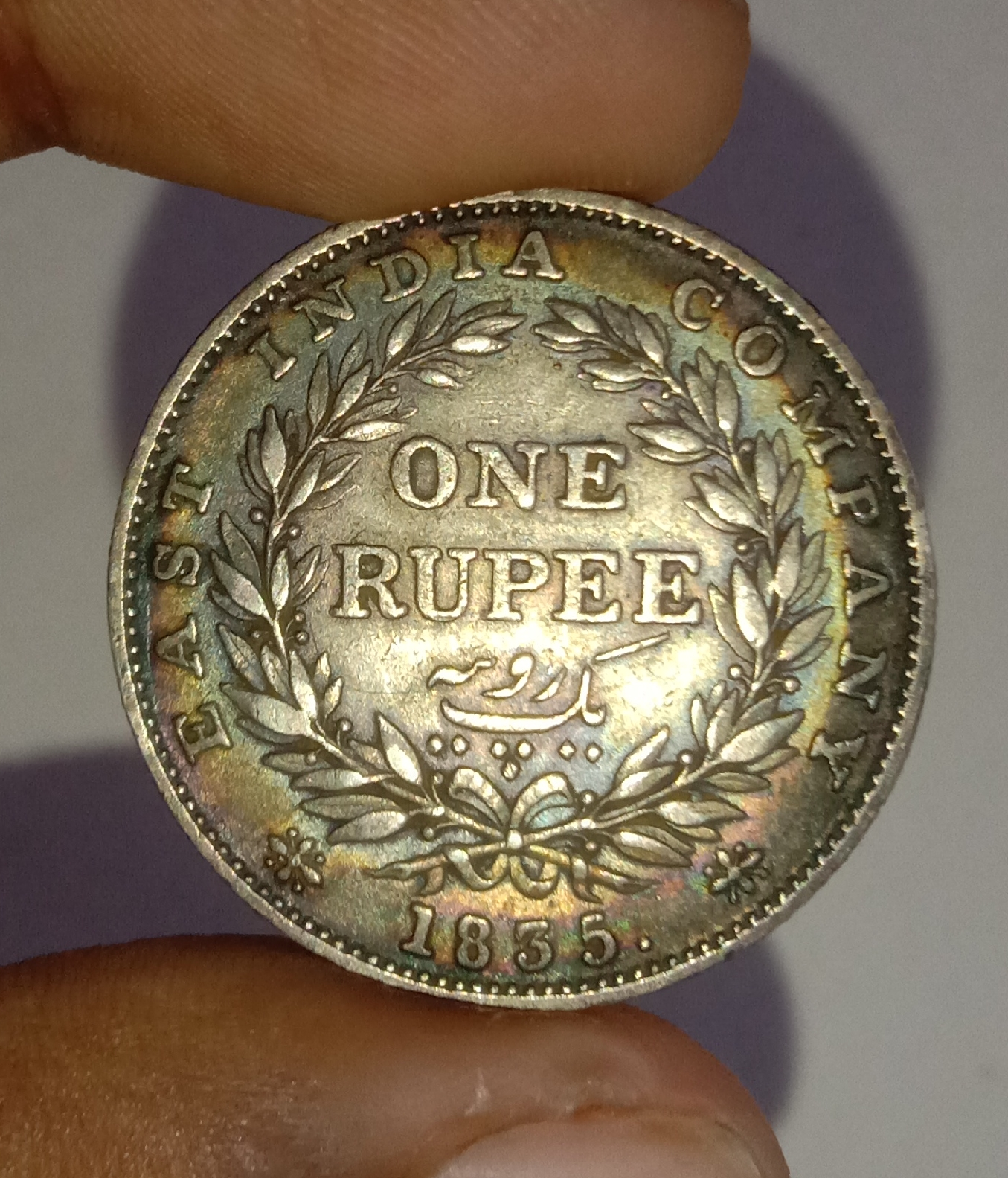
Reverse of the 1835 One Rupee coin, struck in the name of King William IV of England, minted in Calcutta.

In March 1824, the foundation of the third Calcutta Mint was laid on Strand Road and was opened for production from 1 August 1829. Until 1835, coins issued at this mint continued to be in the name of the Murshidabad Mint. The imposing frontage of the building of the third Mint was based on a design of the Temple of Athena in Athens, Greece, usually known as the Parthenon. The operative blocks were hidden out of view by the magnificent frontage.

This mint was named as "Old Silver Mint". The foundation for this mint was laid March 1824, and production began 1 August 1829.

The coinage production capacity then was varying between 300,000 and 600,000 pieces per day. In 1860, an annexe known as the "Copper Mint" was built to the north of the Silver Mint for the exclusive production of copper coins.

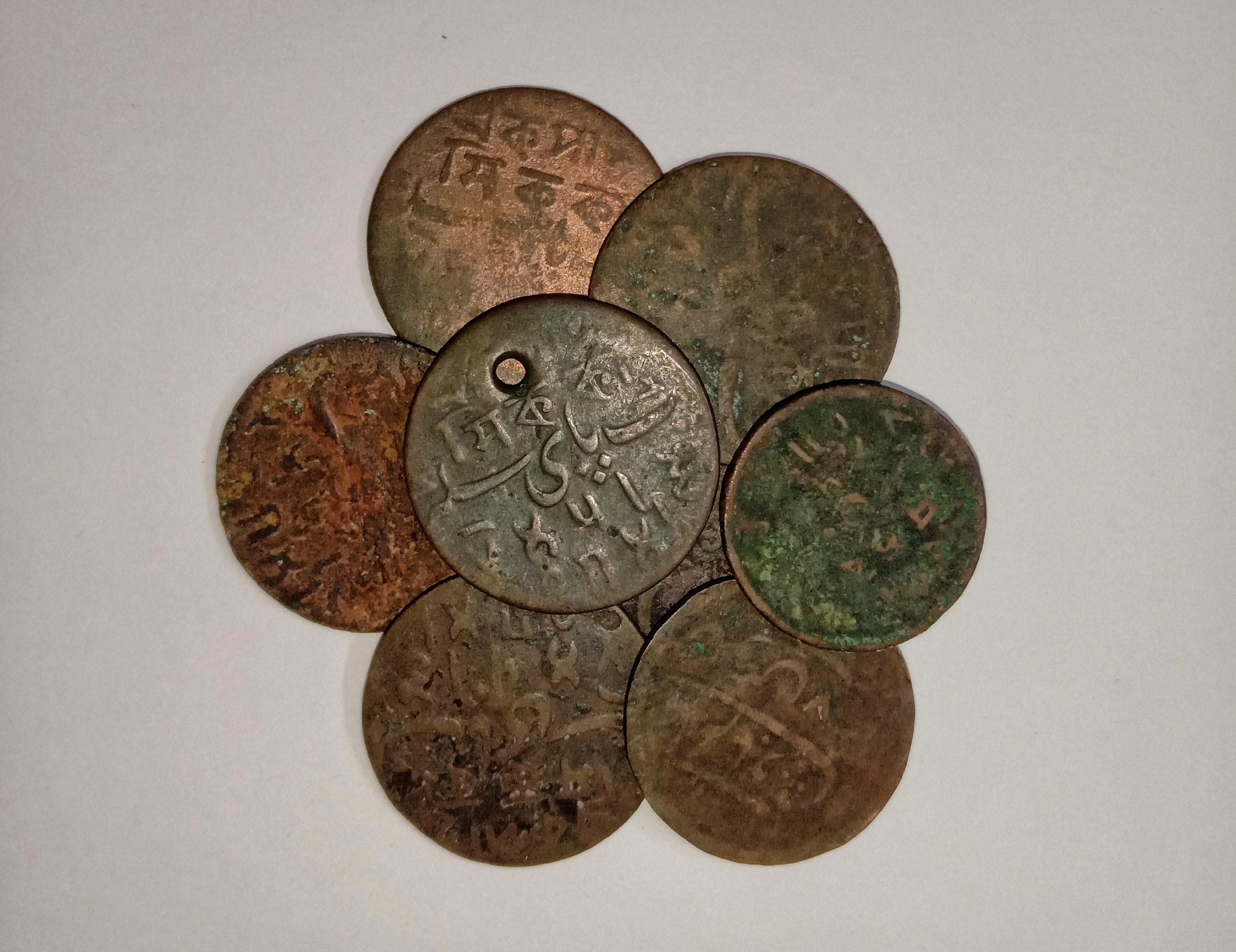
Copper pie sikka coins from the 1820s, minted at the third Mint.

The silver and copper mints both used to function and produce coins of bronze, silver and gold. Both these mints were well equipped with the coining presses supplied by Boulton and Watt of Soho, Birmingham, England.

Apart from minting of coins another important function of the Kolkata Mint was the manufacturing of medals and decorations during the British regime. The production of medals continues to this day. In July 1951, the Kolkata Mint halted production of coinage upon the opening of the new Alipore Mint.

After the closure of this mint in 1952 the building fell into disrepair, after years of neglect. The Kolkata Municipal Corporation declared this building a heritage building. A proposal to restore this building and convert its vast spaces into a museum was put up, and on 10 July 2008 pre-qualification bids were received from eight developers. The project will be a public-private partnership between the Security Printing and Minting Corporation, under the finance ministry, owner of the mint, and the winning bidder.

== Alipore Mint ==
In the late 1930s, foundation work for a new mint was completed at Taratala, close to Alipore and construction was to have completed by early 1942. However World War II brought all construction to a halt. It was completed in early 1950s.

The Alipore Mint was opened by Finance Minister of Government of India Shree C. D. Deshmukh on 19 March 1952. The full operation for the coinage and preparation of medals, decorations and badges started in Alipore Mint from this date. In addition to production of coins for domestic use also produces coins for other nations.

Alipore Mint has merged as cooperation and not a totally Government controlling body since 2008. It is a semi government and semi private sector organization at present.

== Alipore Mint Colony ==
Alipore Mint Colony is located in few minutes distance from Alipore Mint. It is a closed boundary government protected area. It has a huge land for the residence and relaxation for all the employees of India Government Mint. The employees are facilitated High end Central Government Security, 24hrs water supply, cooperative store and other all such facility. Ample amount of space of ground for sports and play ground is provided for enjoyment and relaxation and entertainment.

Apart from that inside the closed premises, Central Government School is provided for children education till 10+2 standard. Medical facilities are also provide by the Central Government Health Scheme authority.

== See also ==
- Indian rupee
- Indian coinage
- India Government Mint
- Mumbai Mint
