= Faculdade de Informática e Administração Paulista =

Brazilian university

Coordinates: 23.59511°S 46.68713°W

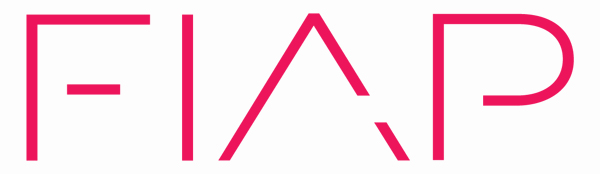
- Type: Private
- Established: 1993
- President: Fabiula Alves Pimentel Baraúna
- Location: São Paulo and Barueri, São Paulo, Brazil
- Campus: Urban
- Colors: black and magenta
- Website: Official website

Faculdade de Informática e Administração Paulista (FIAP) is a higher education institution in São Paulo, Brazil. It was created in São Paulo, in 1993. It has traditions in the area of Informatics. Bachelor courses include Computer engineering, Information system, Management, Computer network, Database, Internet system, System analysis and development, Cybersecurity, and Game development. It has been consistently ranked as one of the best private universities of the country. It also teaches MBA Programs level courses.
