= StandWithUs =

Pro-Israel advocacy organization

- Formation: 2001
- Type: Nonprofit pro-Israel education and advocacy organization
- Tax ID no.: 01-0566033
- Headquarters: Los Angeles, California
- International Director: Roz Rothstein
- Revenue: $26.8 million (2023)
- Expenses: $24.1 million (2023)
- Website: www.standwithus.com

StandWithUs (SWU) (also known as Israel Emergency Alliance) is a nonprofit pro-Israel advocacy organization founded in Los Angeles in 2001 by Roz Rothstein, Jerry Rothstein, and Esther Renzer.

StandWithUs is a leading pro-Israel advocacy group. It maintains a significant presence on university campuses throughout the United States, Canada, the United Kingdom, South Africa, Australia and Brazil. The organization aims to combat what it perceives as antisemitism and misinformation related to Israel while promoting a positive image of the country. It trains students in pro-Israel advocacy, organizes protests, runs billboard and ad campaigns, and files complaints on the behalf of students. StandWithUs actively works to counter Boycott, Divestment, Sanctions (BDS) campaigns on campuses and beyond. It has also engaged in collaborations with the Israeli government on various initiatives.

== Founding and organization ==
StandWithUs was founded in 2001 by Roz Rothstein, a family therapist in Los Angeles whose parents were Holocaust survivors, her husband Jerry Rothstein, and Esther Renzer. She has said the turning point for her came during the Second Intifada, when she observed what she perceived as the distorted media portrayal of the conflict, specifically following the murders of Koby Mandell and Yosef Ishran. After meeting with dozens of local Jewish leaders, Rothstein concluded that there was no organization with the resources to "explain Israel" so she decided to create her own.

Rothstein remains SWU's executive director. Due to her leadership, she has twice been named one of the 50 most influential Jews in America by The Forward, and The Jerusalem Post named her one of the 50 most influential Jews in the world in 2016. In 2015, its board of directors included Naty Saidoff and Adam Milstein. The organization has a team of 80 lawyers who provide pro-bono legal services to students and faculty confronting antisemitism or "antisemitism disguised as anti-Zionism". Roberta P. Seid previously served as an education-research director.

SWU receives its funds via the Israel Emergency Alliance, an IRS registered nonprofit. Creative Community for Peace, established in 2012 by David Renzer, the former CEO of Universal Music Publishing, also received its funds from the Israel Emergency Alliance, until it received its own tax deduction status. Jewish Voice for Peace claims that Creative Community for Peace is an alternate name for this SWU, however they claim that their activities center around the entertainment industry.

SWU is a member of the Israel on Campus Coalition. The Center for Combating Antisemitism is part of SWU. In 2020, SWU and the Israeli American Council (IAC) led a nonpartisan slate in the World Zionist Congress elections.

As of 2022, SWU has 18 offices across the U.S. and branches in Israel, France, the United Kingdom, Australia, Canada, South America, and South Africa.

== Views ==
While some claim that SWU is right-wing, Rothstein rejects the label and asserts that the organization is nonpartisan. In terms of its position within a large range of American Jewish pro-Israeli movements, sociologist Dov Waxman says that SWU lies on the right end of the spectrum of American Jewish groups, with such groups as The David Project, the Zionist Organization of America, the Israel Project, and the Jewish Institute for National Security of America. SWU also voices its opposition to all forms of racism, including Kahanism.

Rothstein says that SWU does not advocate specific policy positions and that its goal is merely to inform and "counter the vicious anti-Israel, anti-Semitic propaganda campaign" by educating the public about Israel. According to authors Cronin, Marusek and David Miller, SWU does not believe the West Bank is occupied and supports Israeli settlements. In an interview with Haaretz, Rothstein acknowledged having an emotional attachment to what she called "Judea and Samaria", because it is where the Jewish people began. She has said that Palestinian leaders have used the settlements as an excuse for "postponing negotiations and for rejecting all possible peace offers from Israel" and that ceding parts of the territory for a future Palestinian state would require "serious negotiations". SWU views the Israeli-Palestinian conflict as territorial rather than existential. Lessons by SWU have highlighted that Palestinian refugees "were not the result of Israel's founding but of the war Arab nations launched against Israel", a position Israeli historians contest.

SWU is opposed to J Street, a self-declared "dovish" pro-Israel lobby. In a debate with J Street President Jeremy Ben-Ami, Rothstein accused him of thinking that he knows "better than the Israelis" how to achieve peace with the Palestinians. She also complained that J Street primarily pressures and criticizes Israel and not the Palestinians. Ben-Ami faulted her for taking a black-and-white approach to the conflict and concluded that there was little common ground between them. Rothstein is also opposed to Breaking the Silence, an organization of former Israeli soldiers opposed to the occupation. She has described as disingenuous groups that profess love for Israel but blame it for the lack of peace while refusing to address Palestinian anti-peace behavior. Rothstein believes supporters of Israel should support whatever government is elected in Israel and that Zionists who are publicly critical of the state of Israel for its treatment of Palestinians do not support the country.

SWU actively opposes the Boycott, Divestment and Sanctions (BDS) movement, which it considers antisemitic. SWU is a proponent of anti-BDS laws, which are intended to discourage boycotts of Israel by requiring state contractors to promise that they are not boycotting Israel, and does not believe that they impinge on freedom of speech. SWU claims that BDS's true objective is "the elimination of Israel and the end of Jewish self-determination" and calls the movement "a dangerous new front that has opened in the war against Israel". SWU believes that anti-Israel views, often masked in "human rights language", risk gaining influence in the American political system, and that they are easier to spot on the far right than on the far left, according to the group's Midwest executive director Peggy Shapiro.

In April 2021, SWU praised The Associated Press (AP) for changing the spelling of "anti-Semitism" to "antisemitism". They described it as an important move, saying that in doing so, the AP had joined the collective effort against Jew hatred. The organization has endorsed and advocated for adopting the IHRA definition of antisemitism.

== Pro-Israel activism training ==
The organization offers two one-year programs to train students in pro-Israel activism, distributes pamphlets and "fact sheets" on Israel, and sets up pro-Israeli lectures. According to Haaretz journalist Judy Maltz, no organization compares with SWU for "turning up the heat on the Israel-Palestinian debate at universities", and its tactics in doing so are controversial.

SWU established and funds its own network of "fellows", students trained to use cameras, videos, and robots to film events that are considered anti-Israel at universities, and whose role is said to be one of acting as SWU's "eyes and ears" on campuses. According to Maltz, the presence of SWU activists at anti-Israel demonstrators has often provoked clashes that, in her view, serve the organization's interests. Students are taught to warn anti-Israel demonstrators when their disruptions may be violating the law.

StandWithUs Emerson Fellowship Logo

The Emerson Fellowship program, created in 2007, trains college student leaders from 90 universities throughout North America to be pro-Israel advocates on their campuses. As of 2020, the program is offered to North American, British, and Brazilian students. The number of students enrolled in the program has grown from 38 in 2007 and 2008 to 107 in 2020. SWU also offered a Hispanic Emerson Fellowship. A year-long UK Emerson fellowship, based on its American fellowship, was launched in September 2018. The fellowship was also launched in South Africa in November 2022.

The group is also involved in training high school students. Created in 2012, the StandWithUs High School Internship is a program directed at North American high school students in 11th and 12th grade and had 125 students enrolled in 2020. It prepares students for challenges potentially faced in college regarding pro-Israel advocacy.

Other educational programs include Shagririm (meaning "ambassadors"), a program directed at young adult Israeli-Americans in southern California with the objective of connecting people to generate pro-Israeli initiatives. In 2012, the program included 54 students from southern Californian universities. Unlike Emerson Fellows, Shagririm was open only to Israeli-Americans. The program was sponsored and run by the Milstein Family Foundation's Israel Leadership Council, later rebranded as the Israeli-American Council.

== Campaigns and activities ==
SWU is a campus-oriented advocacy group and is heavily invested in the recruitment and training of students in pro-Israel advocacy and in media. The organization is active on American, Canadian, British, and Brazilian campuses. It has also run programs in Australia for more than a decade and plans to officially open an Australian office. SWU has also worked with the Israeli government. In 2011, Danny Ayalon said SWU created leverage for the Israel Ministry of Foreign Affairs.

=== Opposition to the Boycott, Divestment and Sanctions (BDS) movement ===
SWU has organized a number of anti-BDS conferences, and has pushed for anti-BDS legislation in various U.S. states, including a Texas bill passed in 2017. It has condemned various divestment resolutions passed by universities, calling them discriminatory and hateful.

In 2011, SWU helped organize the Olympia Food Co-op lawsuit. In 2010, the Olympia Food Co-op's board of directors instituted a boycott of Israeli goods. Five co-op members, aided by SWU, sued, alleging that the board had acted beyond the scope of its authority and breached its fiduciary duties. According to Mondoweiss and Ali Abunimah, SWU denied running the case on behalf of the plaintiffs. The court ruled in 2012 that the lawsuit was an illegal Strategic Lawsuit Against Public Participation (SLAPP), a decision upheld by the appeals court. In 2015, the Washington Supreme Court ruled that the state's anti-SLAPP law was unconstitutional and returned the case to the lower courts. In 2018, the court gave summary judgment finding the plaintiffs had no standing to bring a case because they failed to show the co-op was injured.

In 2015, SWU condemned The United Church of Christ, one of the United States' largest Protestant denominations, for calling for "divestment from companies that profit from Israel's occupation or control of Palestinian territories and boycott of products produced in such territories by Israeli companies". The group called those who promoted the resolutions "anti-Israel extremists within the U.C.C." and said they had "severely damaged the U.C.C.'s relationship with the vast majority of the Jewish community, promoted hatred and discrimination against Israelis, and undermined efforts to achieve a just peace between Israelis and Palestinians."

In 2016, over 350 people attended a conference SWU organized with the purpose of devising strategies to combat the BDS movement. The group was also involved in the Maccabee Task Force, an eight-college-campus initiative by Sheldon Adelson with the goal of finding effective ways to combat BDS and antisemitism.

=== Billboard and ad campaigns ===
In various countries, SWU has promoted billboard and poster campaigns for solidarity with Israel, often in opposition to ads run by other organizations. These include a campaign depicting Palestinian leaders and institutions as tutoring children to be terrorists.

In May 2007, the pro-Palestinian U.S. Campaign to End the Israeli Occupation placed 20 poster ads in the Washington, D.C. subway system showing a tank with its turret pointing at a child with a school bag. The text on the poster read: "Imagine if this were your child's path to school. Palestinians don't have to imagine." SWU in response launched its own ad campaign with posters showing Palestinian children with military gear, with one ad reading "Teaching children to hate will never lead to peace."

In August, the group launched a one-year campaign running pro-Israel ads in 98 buses in Chapel Hill, North Carolina. The campaign was meant to counter an anti-Israel ad placed on the buses by the Church of Reconciliation calling for the end of U.S. military aid to Israel. In October, SWU launched a transit campaign in Vancouver buses and light rail stations, running two pro-Israel ads in opposition to ads run by the Palestine Awareness Committee. The ads depicted three maps purporting to show "Jewish Loss of Land" dated from 1000 BCE until "today", and another showed smiling Israeli and Canadian children alongside the statement "Shared Values & Freedom." The ads run by Palestine Awareness Committee had depicted "Disappearing Palestine" on a series of maps, illustrating Palestine shrinking through the years 1946 to 2012.

In May 2019, SWU placed a billboard advertisement on a main Israeli highway in opposition to ads put up by Breaking the Silence. The Breaking the Silence ads targeted tourists visiting Israel to attend Eurovision, and juxtaposed an image of an Israeli beach with the West Bank security barrier.

In February 2022, SWU partnered with JewBelong to launch a billboard campaign against antisemitism in Toronto. In November 2022, SWU launched a campaign against the Albanese government's decision to retract recognition of West Jerusalem as the Israeli capital. The group placed an advertisement in The Australian urging readers to email Prime Minister Anthony Albanese and Foreign Affairs Minister Penny Wong to reconsider the decision.

=== Protests and rallies ===
In September 2007, SWU sponsored a protest against Columbia University, which had invited Iranian President Mahmoud Ahmadinejad to speak as part of its World Leaders Forum. SWU Campus Director Dani Klein said that inviting Ahmadinejad went "above and beyond the issues of free speech" and that giving him a platform was "honoring him". Columbia President Lee Bollinger defended the decision to invite Ahmadinejad as giving the students a chance to hear an adversary's views.

In January 2009, following Israeli air strikes on Gaza, SWU co-organized at least a dozen pro-Israel rallies throughout the United States. In April, the group organized protests against the Durban II conference in Geneva, which it claimed were anti-Israel. A small group rallied in New York and SWU sent 15 delegates to the conference itself. Three French students donned clown costumes and heckled Ahmadinejad during his speech. According to Rothstein, the clown image was supposed to illustrate the absurdity of having countries that violate human rights at the event.

In November 2016, to protest the resolutions passed by UNESCO which denied Jewish and Christian connections to Jerusalem, SWU erected a massive Pinocchio effigy near the United Nations headquarters in New York City. Rothstein expressed concerns that the resolutions not only disregard the historical Jewish roots in Jerusalem but also deprecate and belittle Judaism itself.

In April 2021, SWU organized a protest outside the French Consulate in Los Angeles demanding justice for Sarah Halimi after the man who killed her was acquitted.

=== Caterpillar shareholder resolution (2005) ===
Four Roman Catholic orders of nuns and the pro-Palestinian group Jewish Voice for Peace planned in 2005 to introduce a resolution at a Caterpillar shareholder meeting. The resolution asked for an investigation into whether Israel's use of the company's bulldozer to destroy Palestinian homes conformed with the company's code of business conduct. In response, SWU urged its members to buy Caterpillar stock and to write letters of support to the company. SWU representatives also planned to attend the shareholder meeting and speak out against the resolution. SWU and other Jewish organizations said that Israel was being unfairly singled out.

=== J Street (2009) ===
In October 2009, SWU campaigned against a conference organized by J Street. The organization distributed literature accusing J Street of endorsing "anti-Israel, anti-Jewish narratives" and of demonizing Jewish settlers in the occupied territories. J Street's president Jeremy Ben-Ami responded that SWU was engaged in "thuggish smear tactics". The campaign was not perceived to be effective in discouraging policymakers from attending, given the conference's greater-than-expected turnout, with the attendees including several members of Congress and National Security Advisor General James Jones.

SWU has said that its objection to J Street is based on its support for efforts that demonize Israel, such as the United Nations Goldstone Report, and its advocacy for specific policies that Israeli voters democratically rejected, rather than solely on its criticism of the Israeli government's policies.

=== Disrupting Jewish Voice for Peace meeting (2010) ===
On November 14, Robin Dubner, Michael Harris, and eight other SWU activists disrupted a local Jewish Voice for Peace (JVP) meeting in Berkeley. They heckled the speakers and prevented the meeting from taking place. One activist pepper-sprayed two JVP members but said she was "physically attacked". JVP members said the pepper-spraying was unprovoked. The SWU activists said that the action was in retaliation for heckling of Israeli Prime Minister Benjamin Netanyahu by JVP members the week before. Harris said they acted as individuals and not as part of an organized SWU action.

=== SJP amicus brief (2020) ===
In 2020, SWU filed an amicus brief in support of Fordham University's decision to deny Students for Justice in Palestine's (SJP) application to become an official student group, leading SJP to file a successful lawsuit. The organization argued that the courts had limited jurisdiction in dictating private universities' decisions, that the decision was consistent with Title VI of the Civil Rights Act, and that SJP violated the IHRA definition of antisemitism. The New York State Appellate Division eventually ruled in Fordham's favor and overturned the earlier ruling.

=== UC Merced Professor antisemitism allegations (2020) ===
SWU and the Center for Combating Anisemitism sent a letter to UC Merced asking it to take action regarding a professor who made tweets they labeled as antisemitic. One tweet had an image of the "Zionist Brain", in another tweet he wrote, "the Zionists and IsraHell interest have embedded themselves in every component of the American system, media, banking, policy." SWU expressed support for his constitutional right to free speech but expressed concerns that he'd publicly expressed hatred toward some of the people he was teaching. A formal investigation was launched and the professor was removed from the teaching roster for the spring semester.

=== Condemnation of Paul Gosar (2021) ===
SWU called on Rep. Paul Gosar (R-Ariz.) to apologize for his participation as the keynote speaker at the America First Political Action Conference (AFPAC) in Orlando, Florida. The event was organized by white nationalist and Holocaust denier Nick Fuentes. SWU's CEO stated that a sitting U.S. member of Congress attending a white-supremacist conference legitimizes racism and antisemitism, and she urged the Republican Party leadership to distance itself from Gosar, paralleling the actions taken against former Congressman Steve King for his racist comments.

=== Condemnation of Lara Sheehi (2022) ===
SWU filed a complaint with the U.S. Department of Education's Office for Civil Rights against George Washington University. The complaint stemmed from an extracurricular event organized by psychoanalytic therapist and psychology professor Lara Sheehi featuring a talk by Nadera Shalhoub-Kevorkian, a Palestinian law professor at the Hebrew University of Jerusalem who is critical of Israel's policies. Some Jewish students felt unsettled by the talk and raised their concerns in Sheehi's class, accusing her and Shalhoub-Kevorkian of antisemitism. SWU took action by filing the complaint to address what they perceived as harassment of Jewish students. They alleged that the talk was a "two-hour diatribe" against Israel that left students feeling vulnerable and unsafe and that Sheehi had made offensive comments to a Jewish Israeli student earlier in the semester, telling her, "It's not your fault you were born in Israel", an allegation Sheehi denied. SWU also alleged that the university failed to properly investigate previous complaints against Sheehi, and cited private tweets of hers critical of Israel and Zionism, which she defended as a reflection of her anger at Israeli military actions and occupation. Sheehi disputed the allegations and claimed she was targeted as "an Arab woman whose scholarship and activism advocates for Palestinians".

The complaint prompted the university to hire law firm Crowell & Moring to investigate the allegations. The subsequent administrative investigation cleared both GWU and Sheehi of wrongdoing and concluded that her comments were misrepresented. Despite this, Sheehi accused the university of failing to defend her, and the controversy surrounding her involvement in the event and the ensuing accusations of antisemitism caused significant division within the psychoanalytic community and sparked broader debates about the role of psychoanalysts in activism and politics and the limits of academic freedom.

=== Miscellaneous ===
In 2009, following Israeli air strikes on Gaza set up a "Web Situation Room" to counter online criticism of Israel.

In January 2010, SWU sent a group of seven delegates to Harbin, China to showcase an exhibition entitled "Inside Israel", in the organization's first outreach venture in the country.

In May 2010, SWU invited Elvis Costello on a free VIP tour to Israel "designed to show Mr Costello the diverse nature of Israeli society and highlight the challenges Israel faces in its efforts to promote peace." In 2016, the group dispatched an airplane that flew over the venue of a Roger Waters' set at Desert Trip, displaying the message, "Support Israel-Palestine Peace — Not Hateful Boycotts."

In 2020, SWU criticized President Donald Trump's choice of retired Army Col. Douglas Macgregor to oversee US-German relations and called for a new nominee to serve as ambassador. They referred to Macgregor's 2012 remarks where he claimed that Jewish individuals, known as neocons, unconditionally support the Israeli government. SWU CEO Rothstein criticized this as a rehashed antisemitic conspiracy theory suggesting Jews prioritize Israel over their own countries. Later that year, SWU successfully urged Zoom to prevent a conference from using the videoconferencing platform to host Leila Khaled, invoking the platform's terms of service and anti-terrorism laws.

In February 2021, SWU launched letter-writing campaign to Che and Saturday Night Live condemning a joke made about Israel only vaccinating "the Jewish half" of its population. In April, fashion house Armani removed a blazer resembling a Holocaust concentration camp uniform following a request by SWU.

SWU holds a number of annual gatherings, including a "Festival of Lights" gala, which raises funds to combat antisemitism and has drawn over a thousand attendees each year, and an "Israel in Focus" International Conference.

SWU has conducted nation-wide tours for Israeli army veterans while opposing Jewish communities who host speaking tours of Israeli soldiers who speak out against the occupation.

== Media ==
=== StandWithUs TV ===
In 2020, SWU launched a new platform called "StandWithUs TV" that would produce content to "inform and inspire people of all ages". With the global COVID-19 pandemic impacting in-person activities, SWU decided to move more of its focus into the digital realm.

Shows produced on the platform include "Standing with Israel", "Combatting Antisemitism", "Jewish Refugees in the Middle East", and "Walk Through Israel". Guests have included British Chief Rabbi Lord Sacks and Israeli Ambassador to the UK Mark Regev.

=== Campus Post ===
In 2008, in collaboration with The Jerusalem Post, SWU began publishing a monthly newspaper, Campus Post, to be distributed on university campuses. The short-lived paper included articles by The Jerusalem Post writers on the topics of Israeli news, society, and culture, while students and others in North America contributed articles about pro-Israel activism.

== Finances ==
According to Cause IQ, SWU's revenue and expenses for the 2019 fiscal year were $17,848,945 and $13,935,408 respectively. In 2012, the Jewish Journal described SWU as "a $4 million-a-year operation".

Major donors include Adam Milstein, who donated $851,500 to SWU between 2004 and 2016. SWU's educational program, the Emerson Fellowship, is funded by J. Steve and Rita Emerson. The UK chapter of the group has raised hundreds of thousands of pounds in various fundraisers, including a November 2021 crowdfunding event that raised £750,000 and a May 2023 campaign that raised over £600,000.

In 2009, over half of SWU's budget was allocated to fund student activities on U.S. campuses. and nearly 15% of the group's budget went to the Israeli office, which trains 150 Israeli students each year in advocacy skills in conjunction with the Ministry of Foreign Affairs.

In January 2015, the investigative Israeli website The Seventh Eye reported that SWU would receive $254,000 from the Prime Ministers Office, to set up a "Social Media Ambassadors" program to educate young people on how to use social media to promote Israel. However, according to SWU, the project did not go ahead.

== Reception ==
SWU has been described as "one of the world's prominent Israel-advocacy groups", and as a leading and effective force on American campuses, with a presence "difficult to ignore". Judy Maltz of Haaretz has noted that "of all the pro-Israel forces active on U.S. college campuses today, none has poured as much energy, resources and sheer audacity into the battle for the hearts and minds of young Americans as StandWithUs". The organization is said to hold "significant sway both in Congress and among the American public".

SWU has a large social media presence and is widely reposted by pro-Israel accounts. It has been praised for "fighting for the legal rights of pro-Israel students and arming them with facts to defend themselves from anti-Semitism while remaining true to their liberal values while still defending the US-Israel relationship".

Steven M. Cohen, professor of Jewish social policy at Hebrew Union College, has expressed his concern over the negative impact of SWU's attitude on Israel. He believes that by adhering to a stance that unquestioningly supports everything Israel says, the organization risks impeding Israel's ability to benefit from constructive input and discouraging engagement from Jewish Americans in discussions related to Israel. Cohen emphasizes the importance of having vocal Zionists from diverse ideological backgrounds, including those on the far left, as well as right-wing groups such as the Hilltop Youth, in order to succeed in the public relations battle. David Biale has stated that a paternalistic approach worsens the situation as it prevents students from learning to stand up for themselves and makes them feel as if they are being manipulated.

According to an October 2009 investigation by Inter Press Service, SWU has received funds from a "web of funders who support organisations that have been accused of anti-Muslim propaganda and encouraging a militant Israeli and U.S. foreign policy in the Middle East."

In their 2009 publication The Trial of Israel's Campus Critics, David Theo Goldberg and Saree Makdisi assert that the thirty-three organizations comprising Israel on Campus Coalition, which include SWU along with AIPAC, the Zionist Organization of America, the American Jewish Congress, the Jewish National Fund, are not interested in "the niceties of intellectual exchange and academic process", and that they prioritize tactics such as insinuation, accusation, and defamation over fostering intellectual dialogue and academic processes when responding to arguments and criticisms related to Israeli policies. The organization has been associated with a trend observed among various right-wing and pro-Israel organizations, which some perceive as silencing dissent at campuses in the United States.

In 2014, Israeli columnist Bradley Burston criticized SWU for what he considered question-begging assertions passed off as facts in materials used by the organization to teach college students about Israel. In his view, the group's assertions about the legality of settlements, and the reasons why Israel refuses to allow Palestinians room for their capital in Jerusalem, were lies.

In 2017, Bethany Mandel praised SWU for being the only national Jewish group to express discontent over JVP's decision to feature Leila Khaled as a speaker at one of its conferences, and suggested that other groups follow SWU's lead if they wished to maintain credibility.

In 2018, the right-wing Zionist Organization of America (ZOA) criticized SWU for claiming that Israel "officially supports the two-state solution". ZOA stated that Israel opposes a Palestinian state and slammed SWU's claim as "extremely harmful" and a "serious falsehood".

SWU's approach has been dismissed as "too apologetic" by Israeli diplomat Alon Pinkas, who states that "presenting Israel as the victim of Arab aggression is impossible."

SWU has used Israel's policy on LGBT rights to promote Israel to anti-Zionists, including in a 2005 tour that was allegedly part of a government campaign, Brand Israel, leading to accusations of pinkwashing Israel to divert attention away from its human rights violations. (Note: 'In the context of the Israel-Palestine conflict, the use of LGBT rights has an additional, aggressive purpose: to substitute new conflict lines for old ones, weakening the Palestinian solidarity network. … As core members of the Palestinian network describe the tactic, it seeks to "promote LGBT issues over the universal human rights of all Palestinians … SWU … has sought to embarrass and undermine the Palestinian solidarity movement in the United States. . As part of its efforts, SWU has repeatedly criticized the Palestinian Authority and the Palestinian solidarity network in the United States, highlighting violations of LGBT rights in Palestine.')

Ian Lustick has argued that StandWithUs manipulates statistics on Palestinian demography in order to buttress continued Israeli occupation and settlement of the West Bank.

SWU gave a "Guardians of Israel" award to a person who was said to have intervened to defend Jewish diners against an assault by antisemites. The two men indicted were brought to trial, and sentenced to an obligatory visit to the Museum of Tolerance and 80 hours training in cultural sensitivity. According to a columnist at The Forward, no antisemitic assault by pro-Palestinians had taken place. Roz Rothstein expressed disappointment with the verdict, and stated that the two men deserved a period of imprisonment.

== See also ==
- Christians United for Israel
- Hasbara Fellowships
- The David Project
- AMCHA Initiative
- Israel lobby in the United States
- Public diplomacy of Israel
