= Roz Rothstein =

Founder and CEO of StandWithUs

- Born: 1952 or 1953
- Known for: Founder and CEO of StandWithUs

Roz Rothstein (born 1952 or 1953) is the founder and CEO of the Zionist group StandWithUs. She has been recognized by both The Forward and The Jerusalem Post as one of the most influential Jews in the world.

== Early life and education ==
Rothstein is the daughter of Holocaust survivors. She was an active member of Bnei Akiva while growing up. In the 1970s, she led the summer camp and after-school programming at the Westside Jewish Community Center.

== Career ==
Rothstein served on the board of directors at Temple Emanu-El and Temple Isaiah. She then worked as a family therapist for more than 20 years prior to founding StandWithUs in 2001. Rothstein founded StandWithUs in 2001 during the Second Intifada as a way to support Israel in the Los Angeles, California area. It soon expanded onto college campuses. As CEO, Rothstein received $308,970 in 2014 and $246,127 in 2016 according to publicly available IRS-990 tax returns.

Under Rothstein's watch, StandWithUs grew to 18 offices. In 2016, The Jerusalem Post named her one of the 50 most influential Jews in the world. She was included in the 2012 Forward's Fifty list.

== Positions ==
In early 2020, Rothstein expressed support for the Trump administration's 180-page Israeli-Palestinian peace plan proposal.

Rothstein expressed support for JewBelong's 2020 advertising campaigns.
