= Magenta =

Color

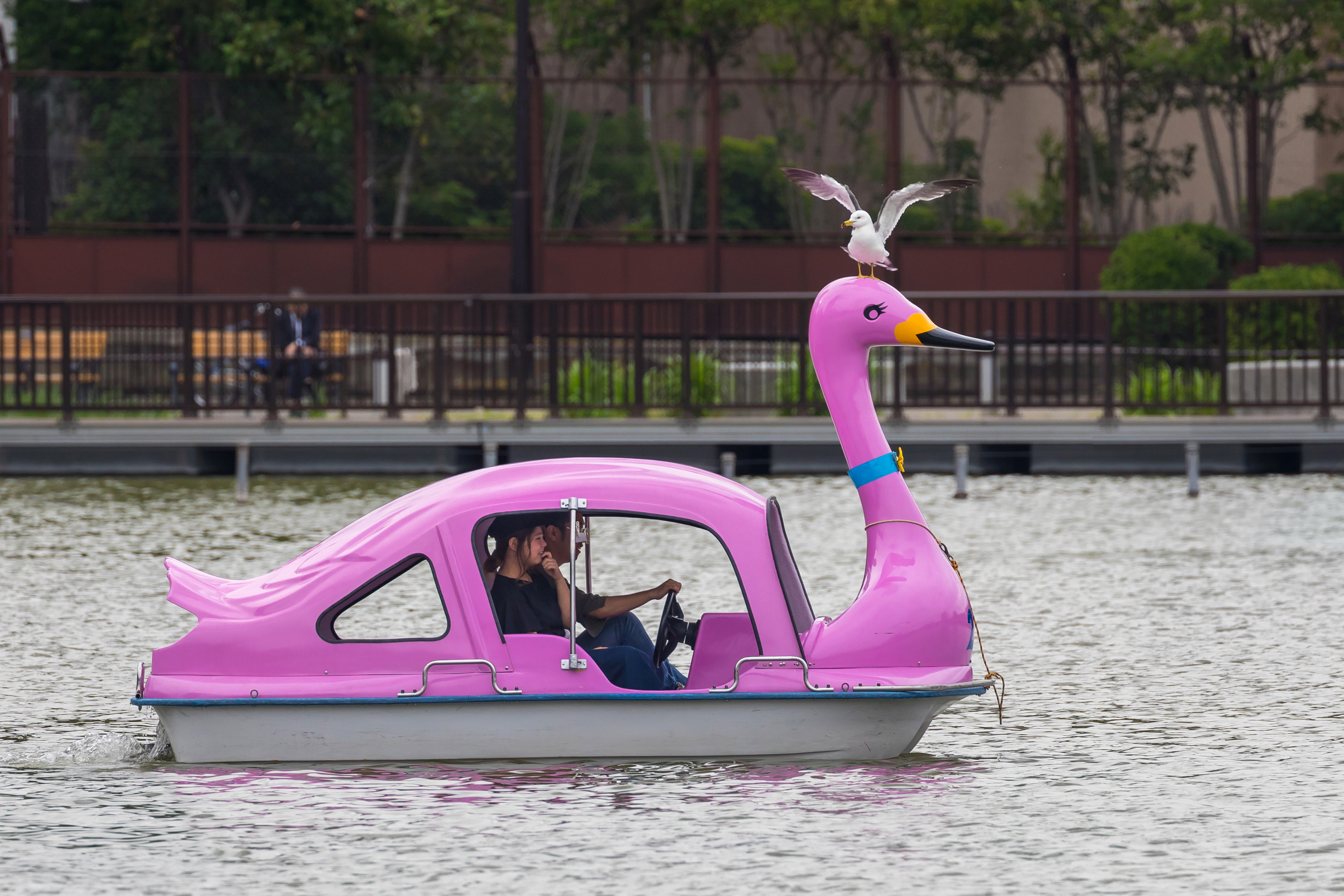
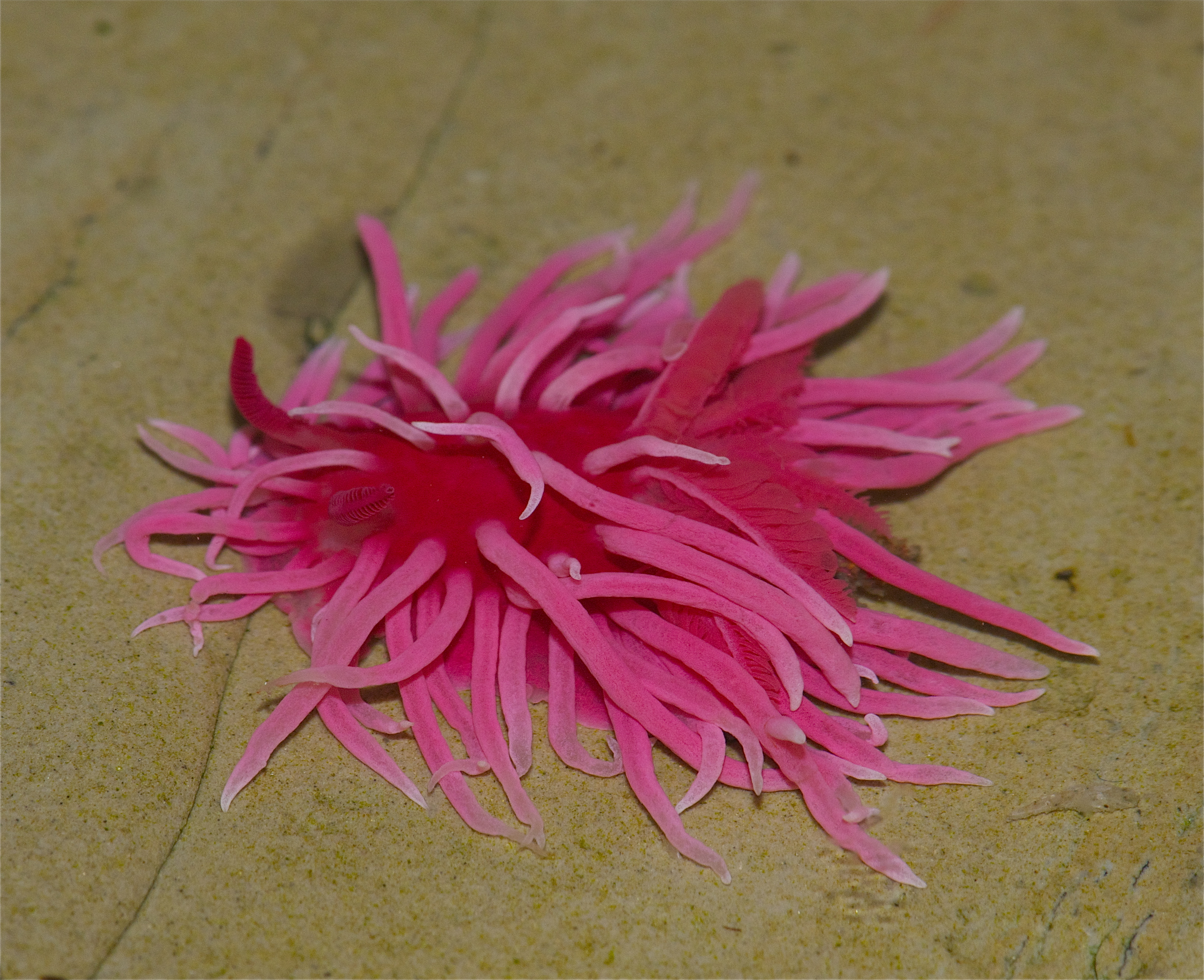
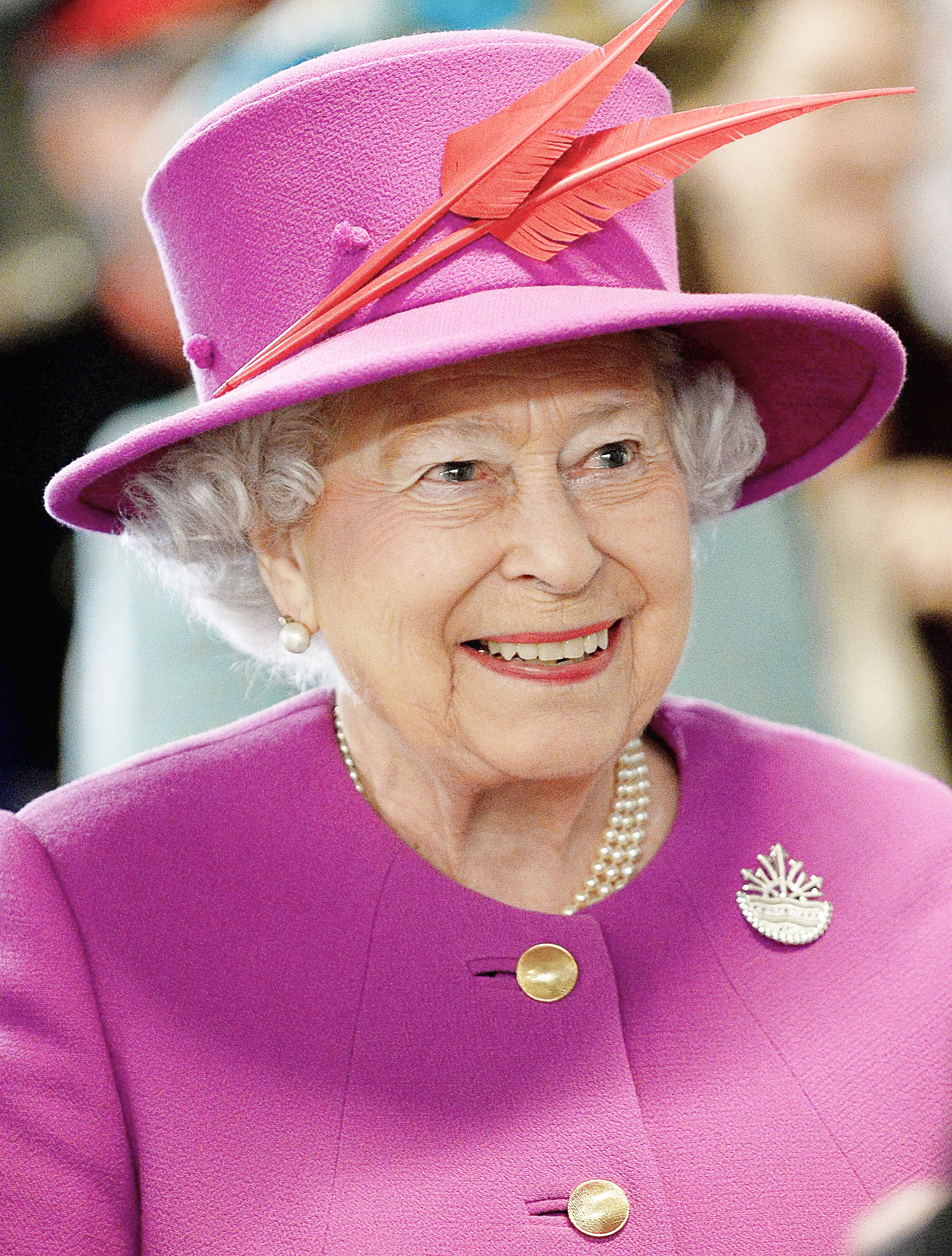
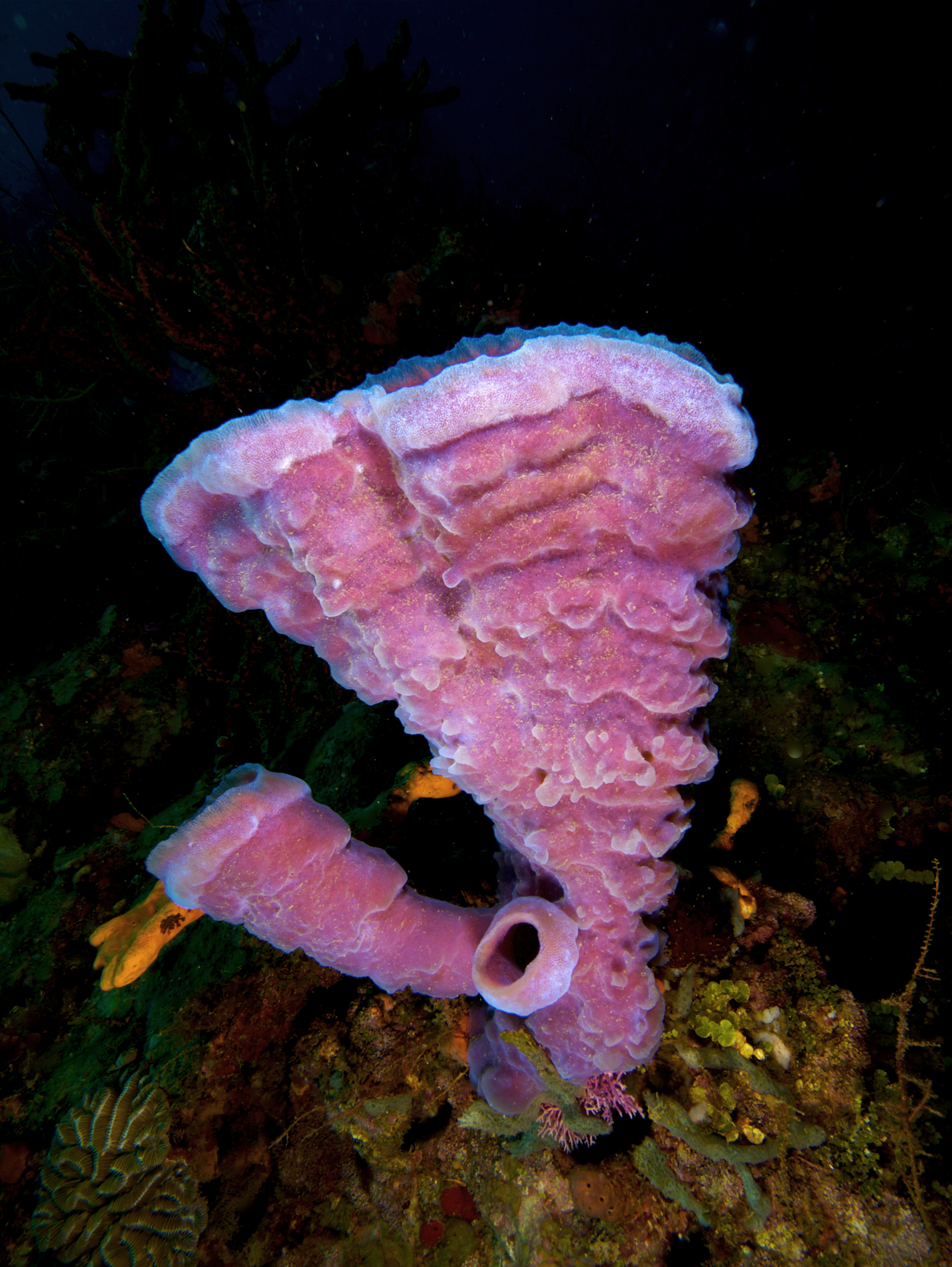
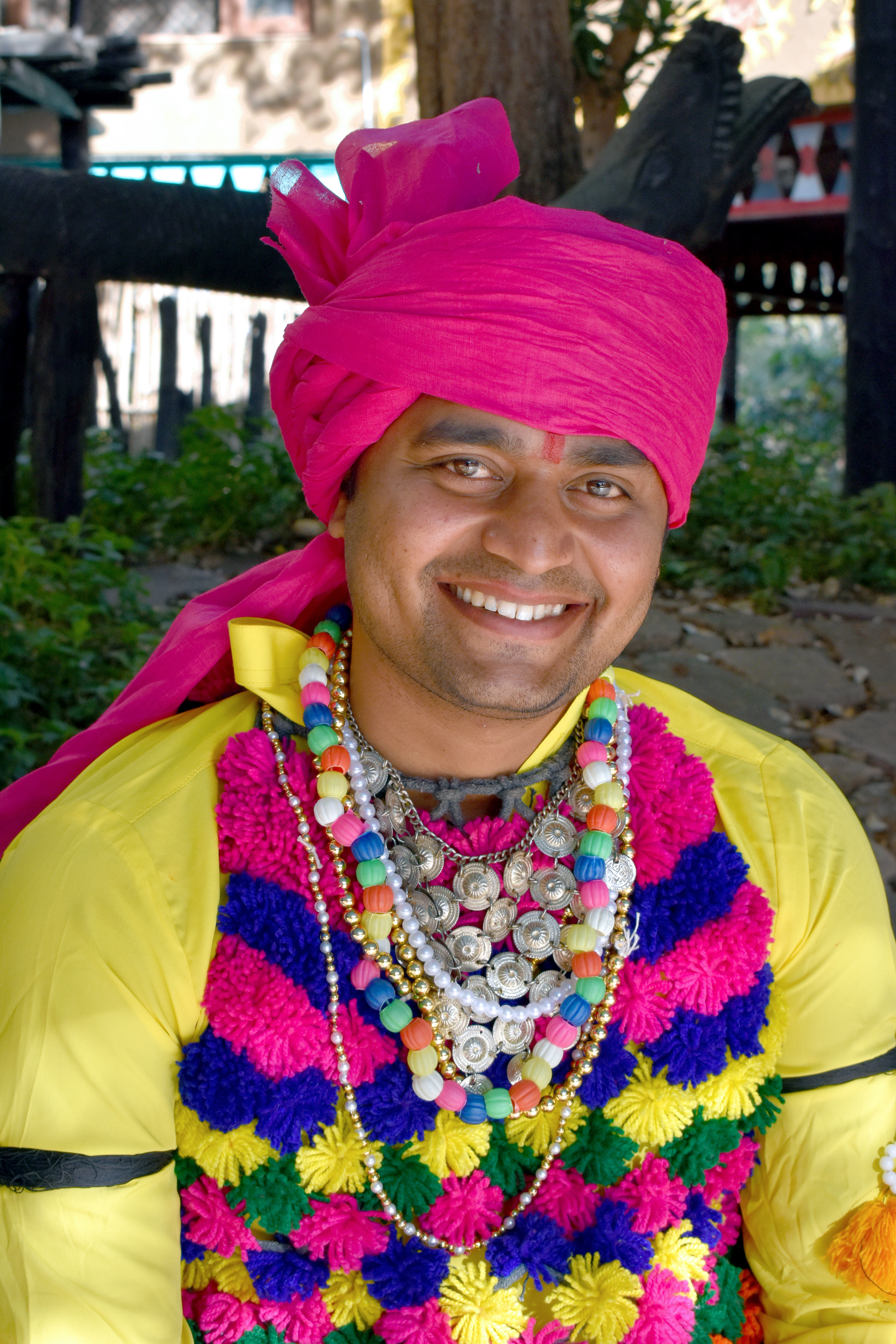
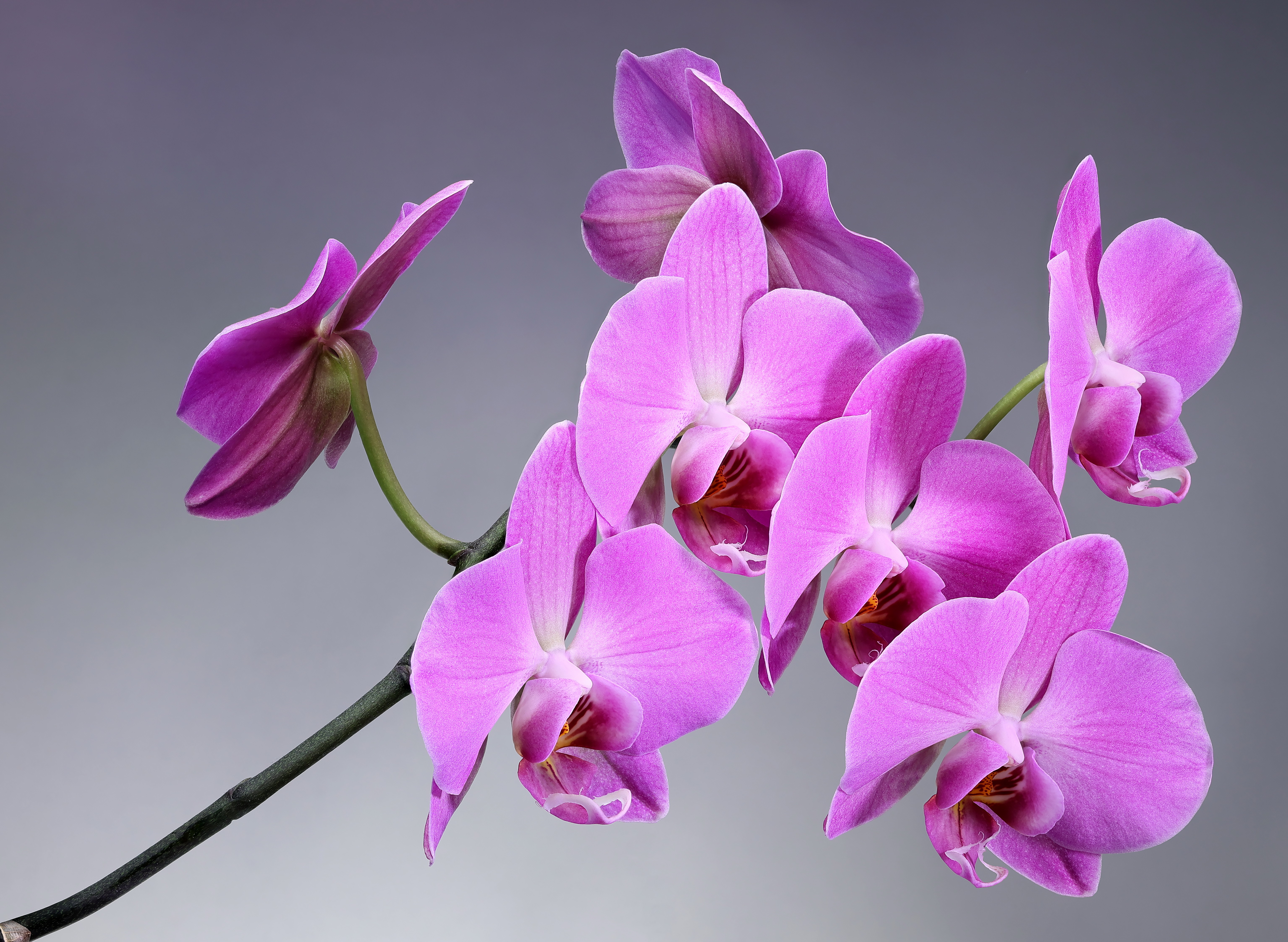
- Clockwise, from top left: Swan boat in Shinobazu Pond, Tokyo; Ceratodoris rosacea; pagri of an Ahirai dancer in Madhya Pradesh, India; Orchidaceae flowers; Elizabeth II in 2015; Callyspongia aculeata.

Color coordinates
- Hex triplet: #FF00FF
- sRGB^{B} (r, g, b): (255, 0, 255)
- HSV (h, s, v): (300°, 100%, 100%)
- CIELCh_{uv} (L, C, h): (60, 137, 308°)
- Source: CSS Color Module Level 3
- B: Normalized to [0–255] (byte); H: Normalized to [0–100] (hundred)

Magenta is a purplish-pink color. On color wheels of the RGB and CMYK color models, it is located directly midway between blue and red. It is one of the four colors of subtractive ink used in color printing by most color printers, also known as CMYK along with yellow, cyan, and black to make all the other colors and hues. The tone of magenta used in printing, printer's magenta, is redder than the magenta of the RGB (additive) model, the former being closer to rose.

Magenta took its name from an aniline dye made and patented in 1859 by the French chemist François-Emmanuel Verguin [fr], who originally called it fuchsine. It was renamed to celebrate the French-Sardinian victory under French Emperor Napoleon III at the Battle of Magenta against the larger army of the Austrian Empire on 4 June 1859 near the Italian town of Magenta, at the time in Austria. This battle was decisive in liberating Italy from Austrian domination.

A virtually identical color, called roseine, was created in 1860 by two British chemists, Edward Chambers Nicholson and George Maule. The web color magenta is sometimes also called fuchsia.

== In optics and color science ==
Magenta is not part of the visible spectrum of light

Magenta is an extra-spectral color, meaning that no color of the visible spectrum has magenta's hue. Magenta is associated with perception of spectral power distributions concentrated mostly in two bands: longer wavelength reddish components and shorter wavelength blueish components.

Magenta is the complementary color of green; thus, mixing one specific shade of magenta light and one specific shade of green light will result in white light. In the RGB color system, used to create all the colors on a television or computer display, magenta is a secondary color, made by combining equal amounts of red and blue light at a high intensity.

Cone cell response curves. Note that a magenta response is elicited in the brain by stimulating S and L cones and little to no M stimulus.

In the CMYK color model, used in color printing, it is one of the three primary colors, along with cyan and yellow, used to print all the rest of the colors. If magenta, cyan, and yellow are printed on top of each other on a page, they make black. If combined, magenta ink plus ink of its complementary color, green, will result in a dark brown or black.

In terms of physiology, the color is stimulated in the brain when the eye reports input from short wave blue cone cells along with a sub-sensitivity of the long wave cones which respond secondarily to that same deep blue color, but with little or no input from the middle wave cones. The brain interprets that combination as some hue of magenta or purple, depending on the relative strengths of the cone responses. In the Munsell color system, magenta is called red-purple.

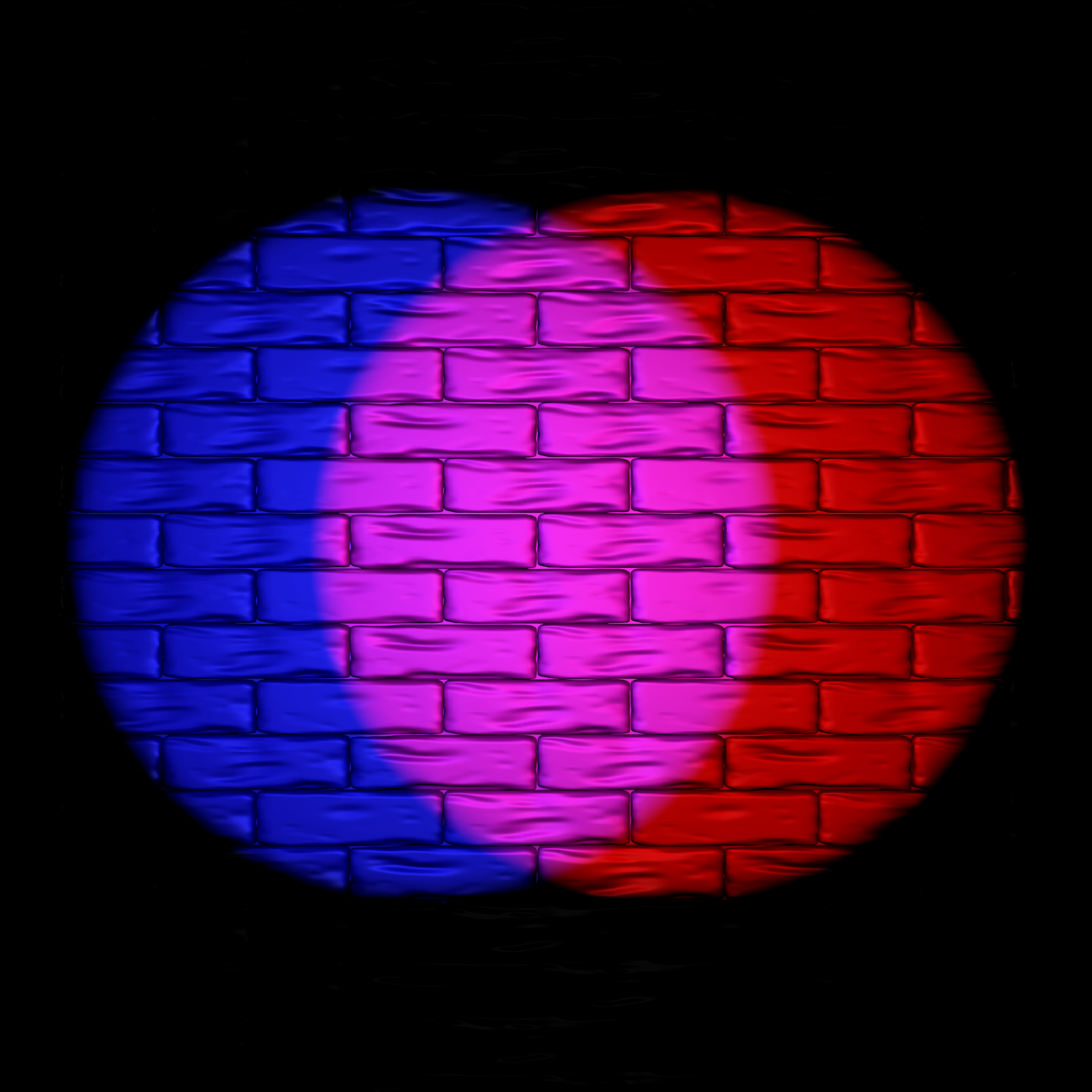
In the RGB color model, used to make colors on computer and television displays, magenta is created by the combination of equal amounts of blue and red light.

In the RGB color wheel of additive colors, magenta is midway between blue and red.

In the CMYK color model, used in color printing, cyan, magenta, and yellow combined make black. In practice, since the inks are not perfect, some black ink is added.

Visible spectrum wrapped to join violet and red in an additive mixture of magenta. In reality, violet and red are at opposite ends of the spectrum and have very different wavelengths.

== Fuchsia and magenta ==
The web colors fuchsia and magenta are identical, made by mixing the same proportions of blue and red light. In design and printing, there is more variation. The French version of fuchsia in the RGB color model and in printing contains a higher proportion of red than the American version of fuchsia.

== Gallery ==
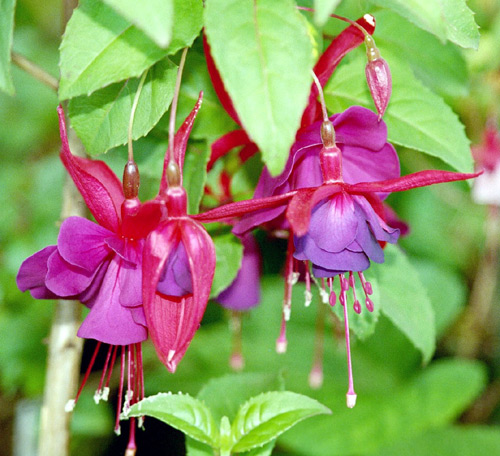
The flower of the fuchsia plant was the original inspiration for the dye, which was later renamed magenta dye.

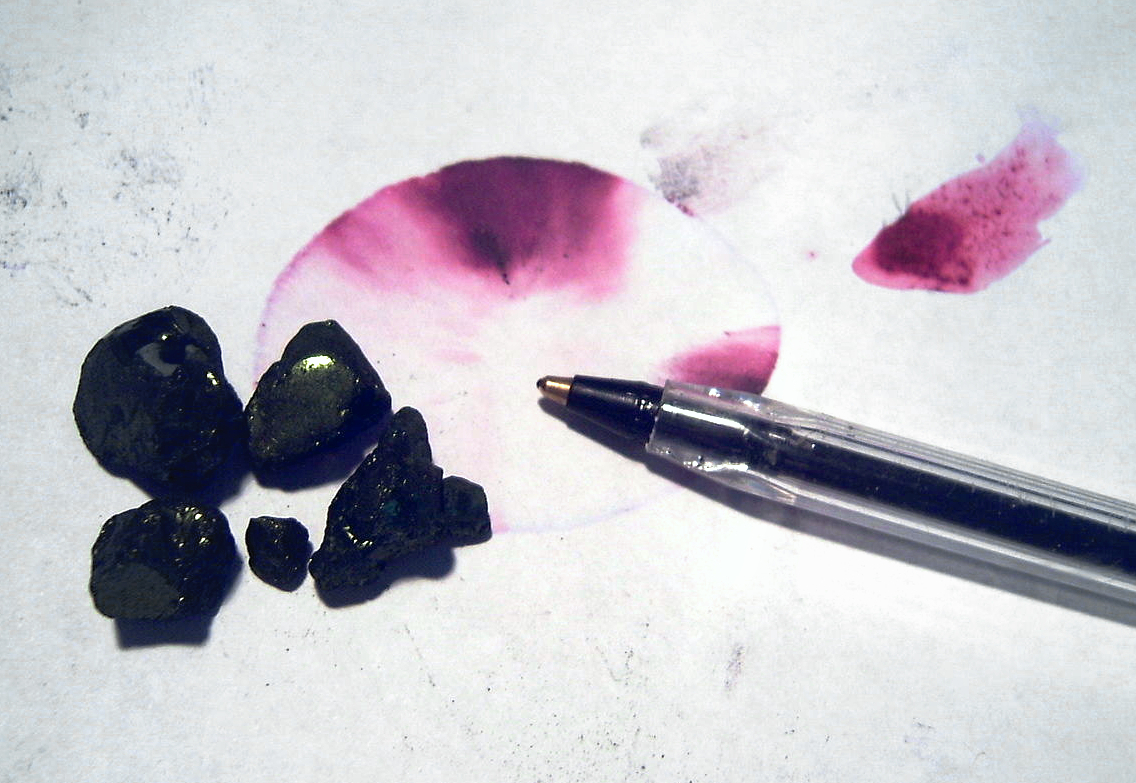
Magenta took its name in 1860 from this aniline dye that was originally called "fuchsine", after the fuchsia flower.

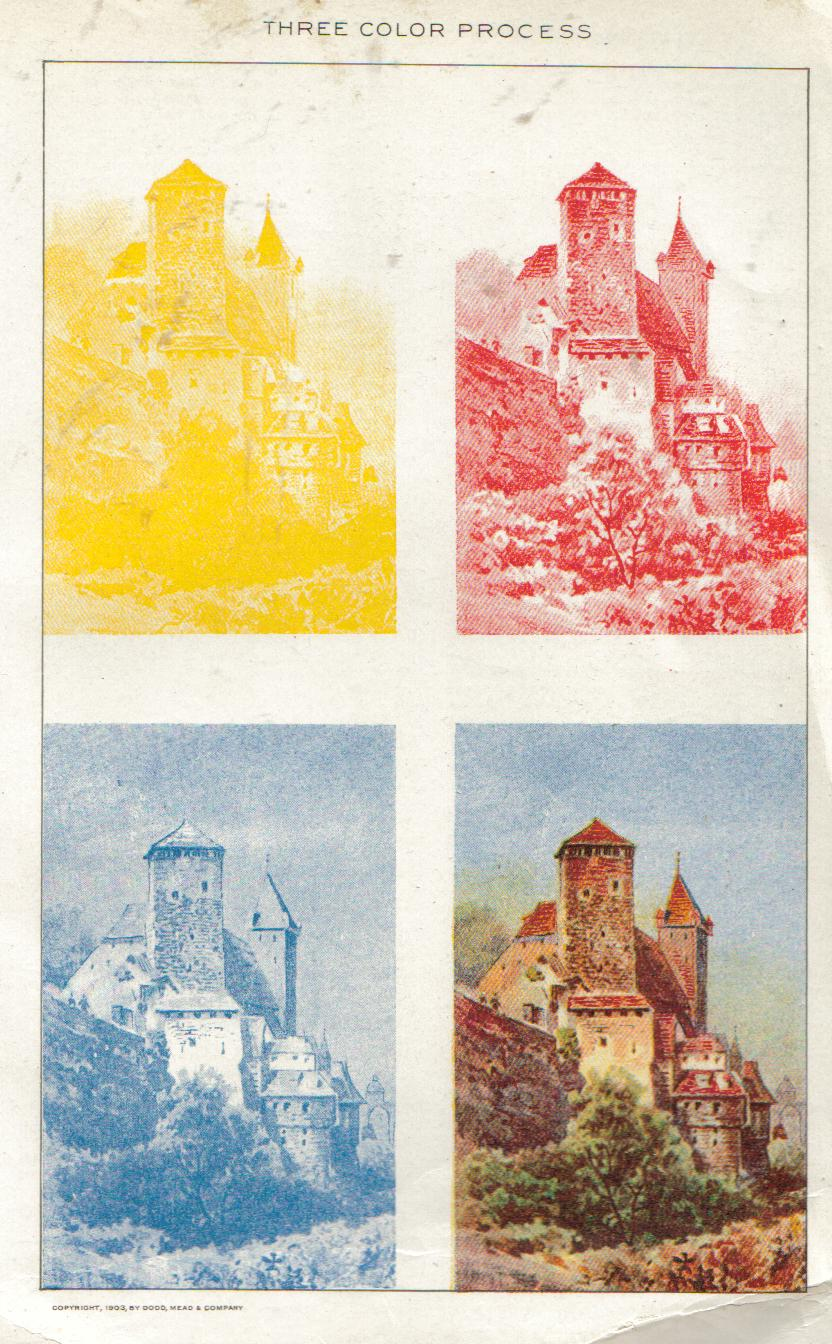
Magenta has been used in color printing since the late nineteenth century. Images are printed in three colors; magenta, cyan, and yellow, which when combined can make all colors. This image from 1902 is using the alternative RYB color model instead.

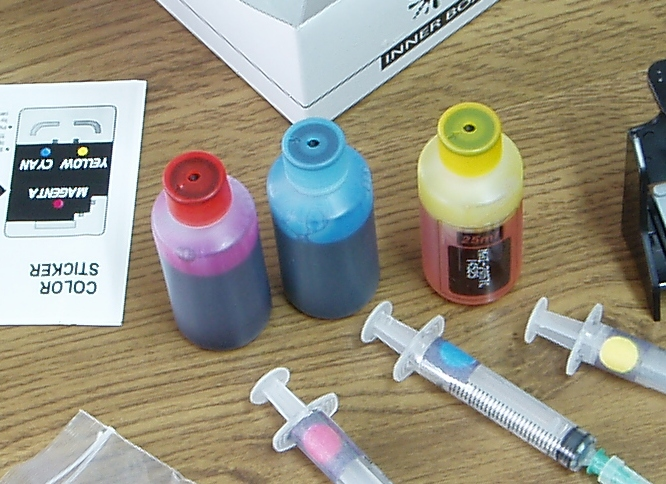
Color printers today use magenta, cyan, and yellow ink to produce the full range of colors.

Magenta is the complementary color of green. The two colors combined in the RGB model form white.

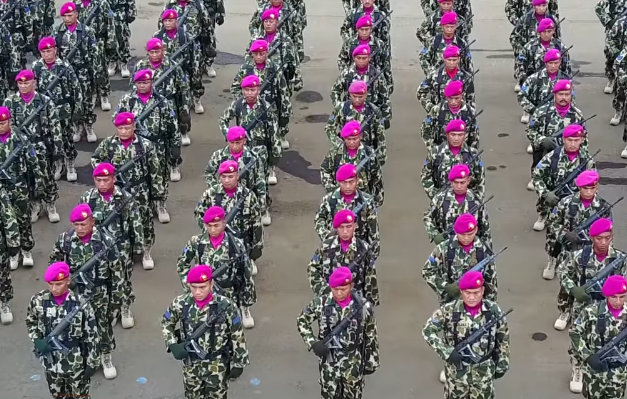
The Indonesian Marine Corps beret color is magenta purple.

== History ==
=== Fuchsine and magenta dye (1859) ===
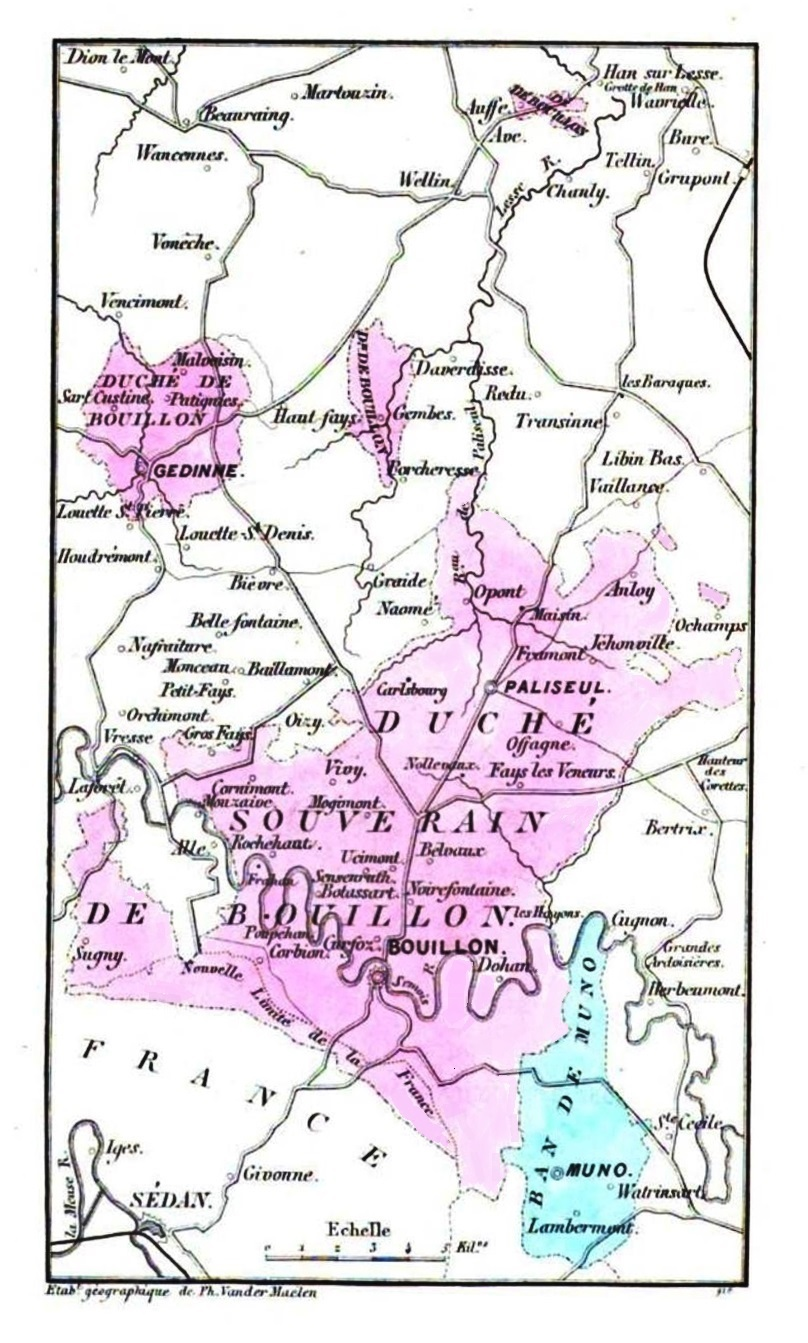
An 1864 map showing the Duchy of Bouillon in magenta

The color magenta was the result of the industrial chemistry revolution of the mid-nineteenth century. It began with the invention of mauveine by William Perkin in 1856, the first synthetic aniline dye. The enormous commercial success of the dye and the new color it produced, mauve, inspired other chemists in Europe to develop new colors made from aniline dyes. In France, François-Emmanuel Verguin, the director of the chemical factory of Louis Rafard near Lyon, tried many different formulae before finally in late 1858 or early 1859, mixing aniline with carbon tetrachloride, producing a reddish-purple dye which he called "fuchsine", after the color of the flower of the fuchsia plant.

Verguin quit the Rafard factory and took his color to a firm of paint manufacturers, Francisque and Joseph Renard, who began to manufacture the dye in 1859. In the same year, two British chemists, Edward Chambers Nicholson and George Maule, working at the laboratory of the paint manufacturer George Simpson, located in Walworth, south of London, made another aniline dye with a similar red-purple color, which they began to manufacture in 1860 under the name "roseine". In 1860, they changed the name of the color to "magenta", in honor of the Battle of Magenta fought by the armies of France and Sardinia against Austrians at Magenta, Lombardy the year before, and the new color became a commercial success.

Starting in 1935, the family of quinacridone dyes was developed. These have colors ranging from red to violet, so nowadays a quinacridone dye is often used for magenta. Various tones of magenta—light, bright, brilliant, vivid, rich, or deep—may be formulated by adding varying amounts of white to quinacridone artist's paints. Another dye used for magenta is Lithol Rubine BK. One of its uses is as a food coloring.

=== Process magenta (pigment magenta; printer's magenta) (1890s) ===
Process magenta (subtractive primary, sRGB approximation)

Color coordinates
- Hex triplet: #FF0090
- sRGB^{B} (r, g, b): (255, 0, 144)
- HSV (h, s, v): (326°, 100%, 100%)
- CIELCh_{uv} (L, C, h): (55, 137, 350°)
- ISCC–NBS descriptor: Vivid purplish red
- B: Normalized to [0–255] (byte)

In color printing, the color called process magenta, pigment magenta, or printer's magenta is one of the three primary pigment colors which, along with yellow and cyan, constitute the three subtractive primary colors of pigment. The secondary colors of pigment are blue, green, and red. As such, the hue magenta is the complement of green: magenta pigments absorb green light; thus magenta and green are opposite colors. The CMYK printing process was invented in the 1890s, when newspapers began to publish color comic strips. Process magenta is not an RGB color, and there is no fixed conversion from CMYK primaries to RGB. Different formulations are used for printer's ink, so there may be variations in the printed color that is pure magenta ink.

=== Web colors magenta and fuchsia ===
Magenta (Fuchsia)

Color coordinates
- Hex triplet: #FF00FF
- sRGB^{B} (r, g, b): (255, 0, 255)
- HSV (h, s, v): (300°, 100%, 100%)
- CIELCh_{uv} (L, C, h): (60, 137, 308°)
- Source: X11
- ISCC–NBS descriptor: Vivid purple
- B: Normalized to [0–255] (byte)

The web color magenta is one of the three secondary colors in the RGB color model. On the RGB color wheel, magenta is the color between rose and violet, and halfway between red and blue. This color is called magenta in X11 and fuchsia in HTML. In the RGB color model, it is created by combining equal intensities of red and blue light. The two web colors magenta and fuchsia are exactly the same color. Sometimes the web color magenta is called electric magenta or electronic magenta.

While the magenta used in printing and the web color have the same name, they have important differences. Process magenta (the color used for magenta printing ink—also called printer's or pigment magenta) is much less vivid than the color magenta achievable on a computer screen. CMYK printing technology cannot accurately reproduce on paper the color on the computer screen. When the web color magenta is reproduced on paper, it is called fuchsia and it is physically impossible for it to appear on paper as vivid as on a computer screen. Colored pencils and crayons called "magenta" are usually colored the color of process magenta (printer's magenta).

== In science and culture ==
=== In art ===
- Paul Gauguin (1848–1903) used a shade of magenta in 1890 in his portrait of Marie Lagadu, and in some of his South Seas paintings.
- Henri Matisse and the members of the Fauvist movement used magenta and other non-traditional colors to surprise viewers, and to move their emotions through the use of bold colors.
- Since the mid-1960s, water based fluorescent magenta paint (fluorescent cerise, fluorescent chartreuse yellow, fluorescent blue, and fluorescent green) has been available to paint psychedelic black light paintings.
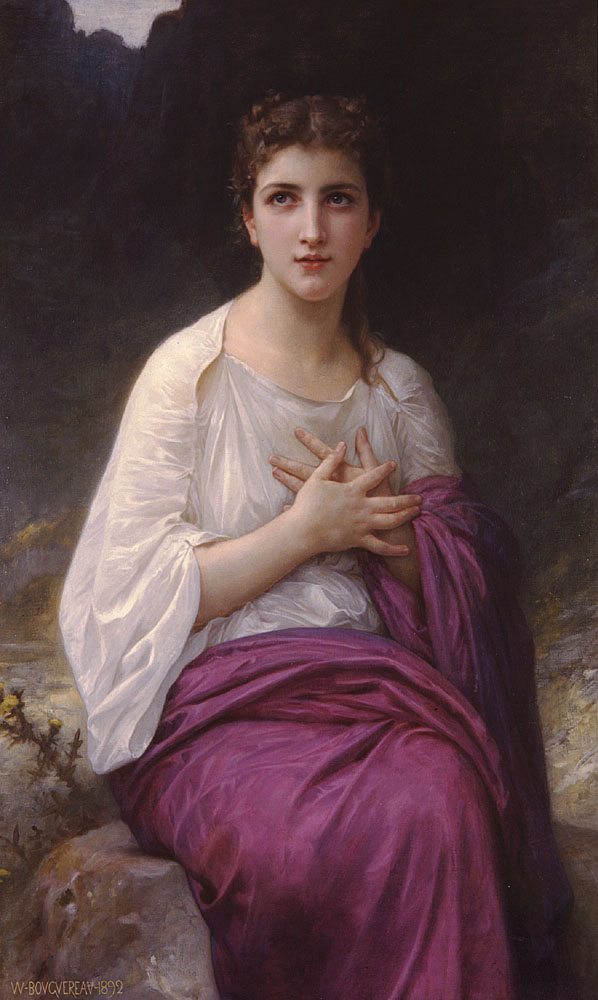
Magenta, along with mauve, made with the newly discovered aniline dyes, became a popular fashion color in the second half of the nineteenth century. It appeared in art in this 1890 work, Psyche, by Bouguereau.

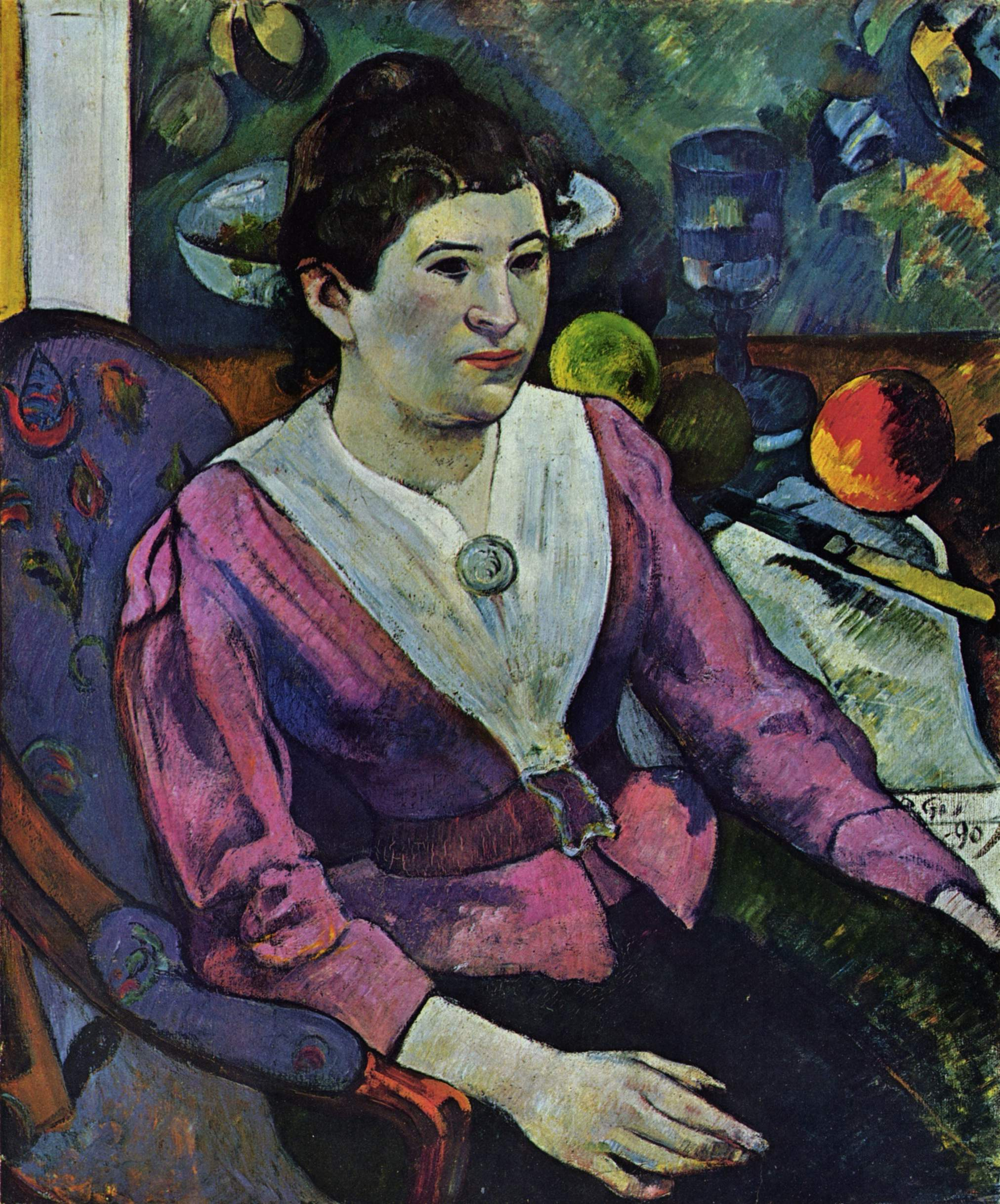
Paul Gauguin, Portrait of Marie Lagadu (1890).

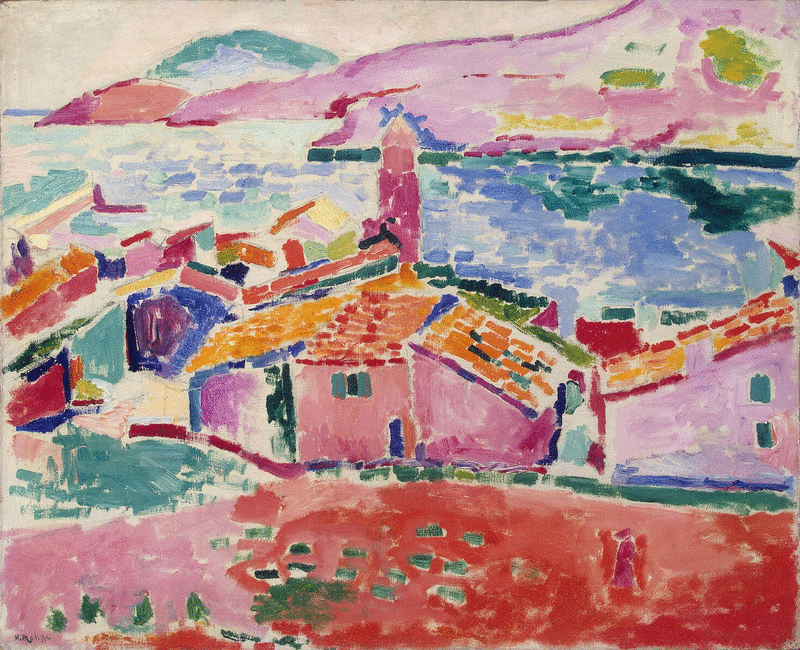
Henri Matisse, Les toits de Collioure (1905). Henri Matisse and the other painters of the Fauvist movement were the first to make a major use of magenta to surprise and make an impact on the emotions of the viewer.

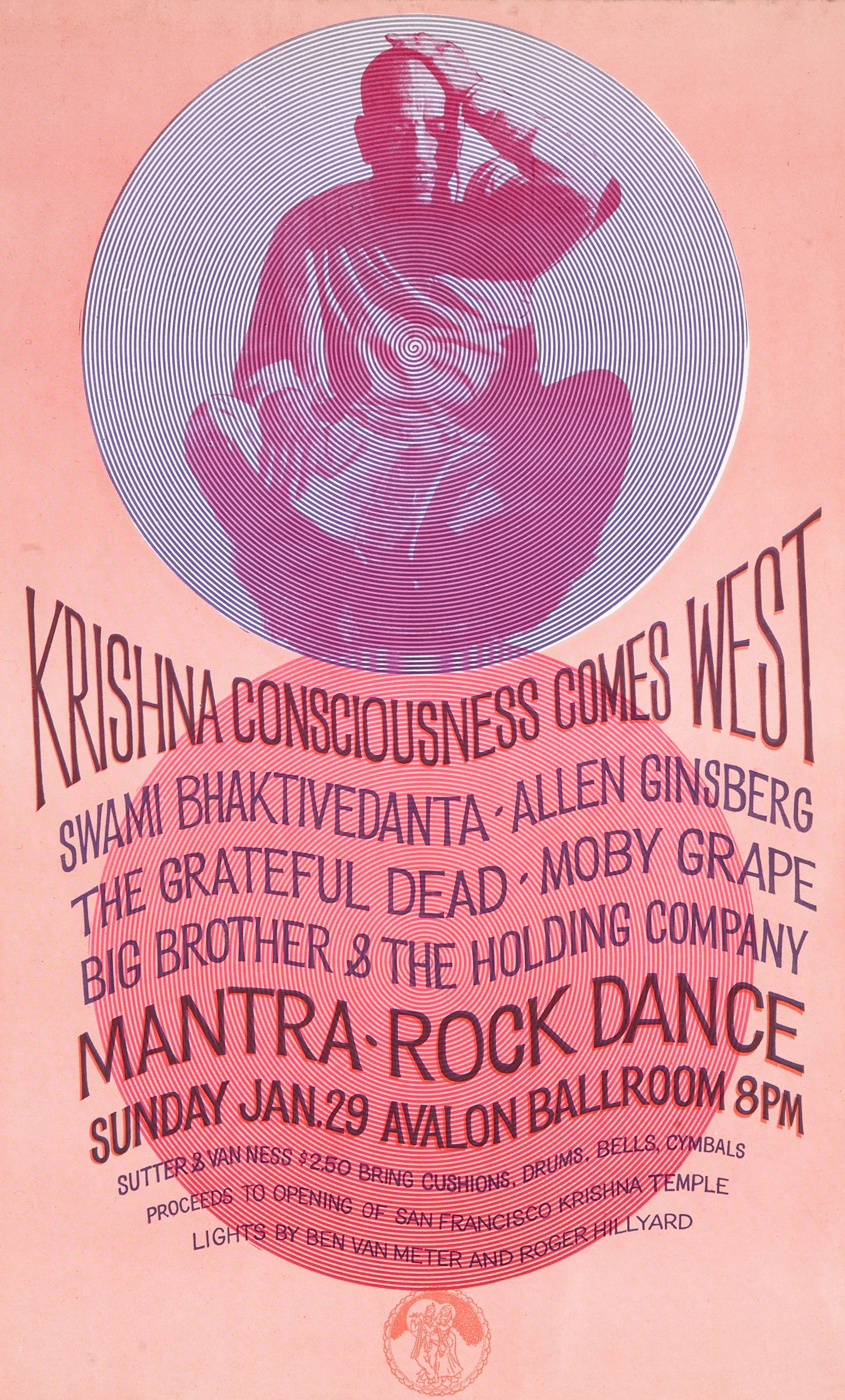
In the 1960s, magenta was a popular color in psychedelic art, such as this concert poster for the Avalon Ballroom in San Francisco (1967).

=== In literature ===
- The color plays a central role in Craig Laurance Gidney's novel A Spectral Hue.

=== In film ===
- The titular alien entity in the 2019 horror film Color Out of Space, an adaptation of the 1927 H. P. Lovecraft short story The Colour Out of Space, is depicted as being magenta due to the color's extra-spectral status.

=== In astronomy ===
- Astronomers have reported that spectral class T brown dwarfs (the ones with the coolest temperatures except for the recently discovered Y brown dwarfs) are colored magenta because of absorption by sodium and potassium atoms of light in the green portion of the spectrum.
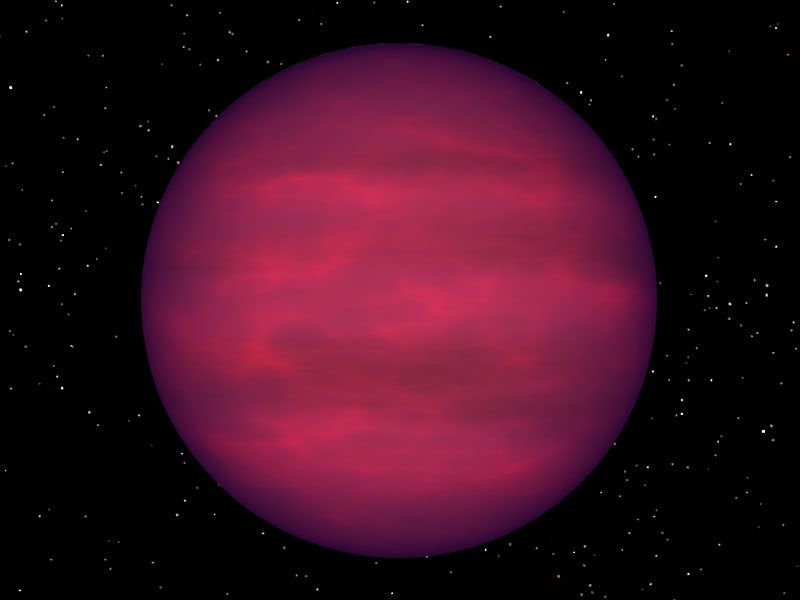
Artist's vision of a spectral class T brown dwarf

=== In biology: magenta insects, birds, fish, and mammals ===
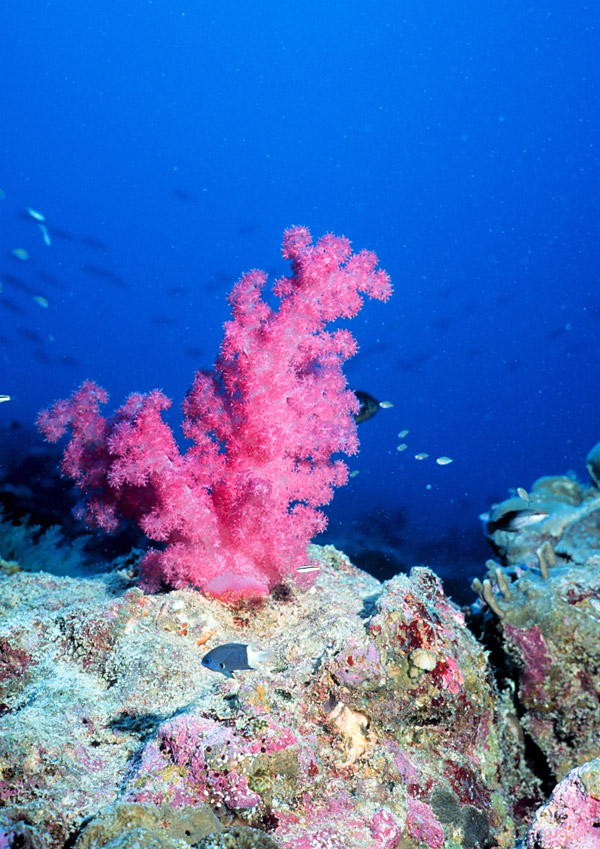
Coral from the Persian Gulf

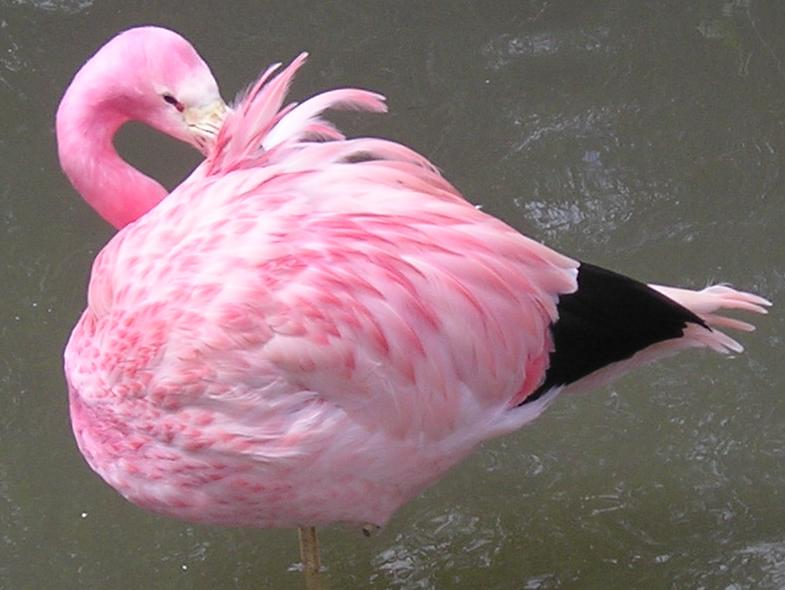
An Andean flamingo, (Phoenicopterus andinus)

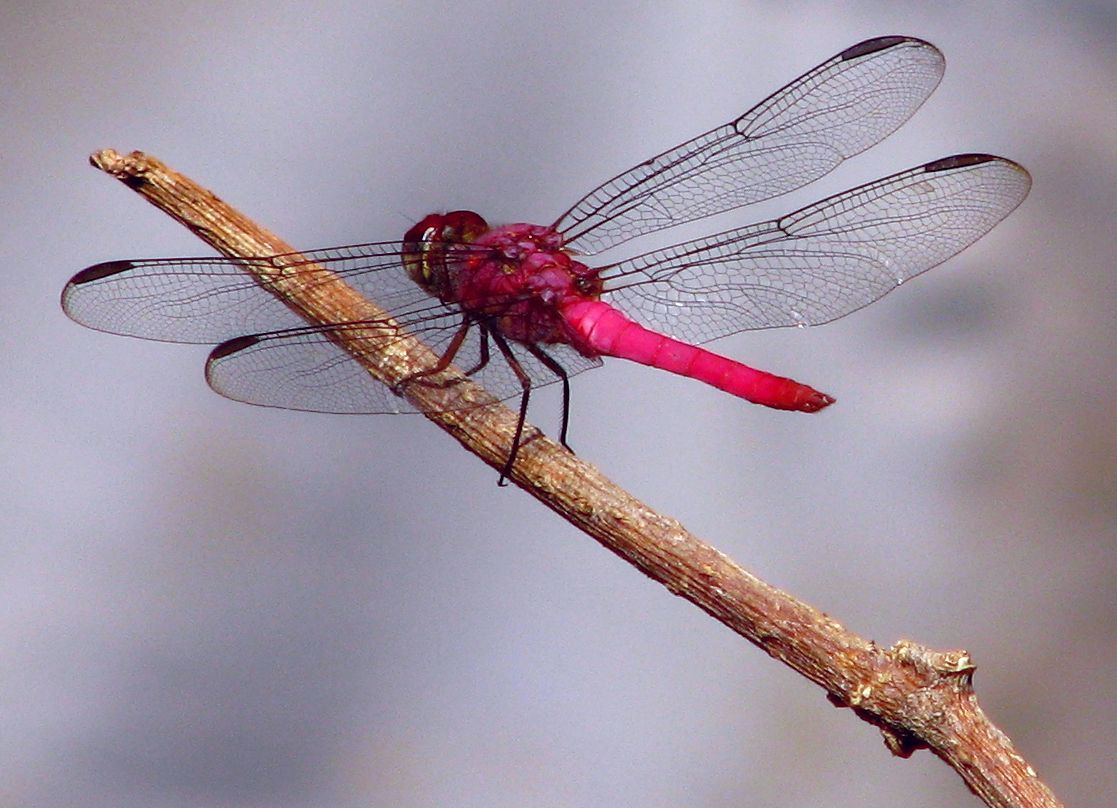
A dragonfly, or Anisoptera Ana Cotta

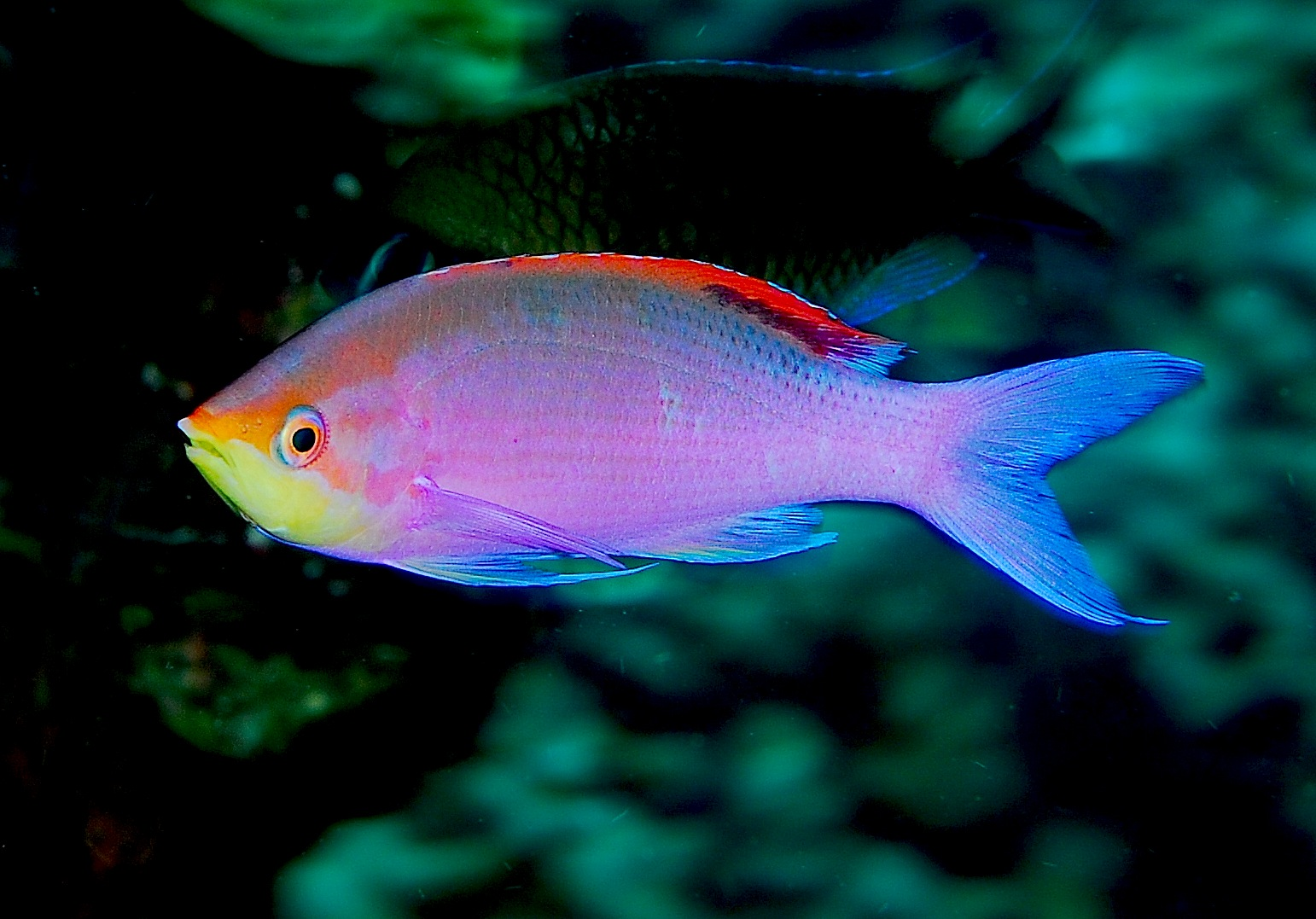
Pseudanthias tuka, a reef fish from the Indian Ocean

=== In botany ===
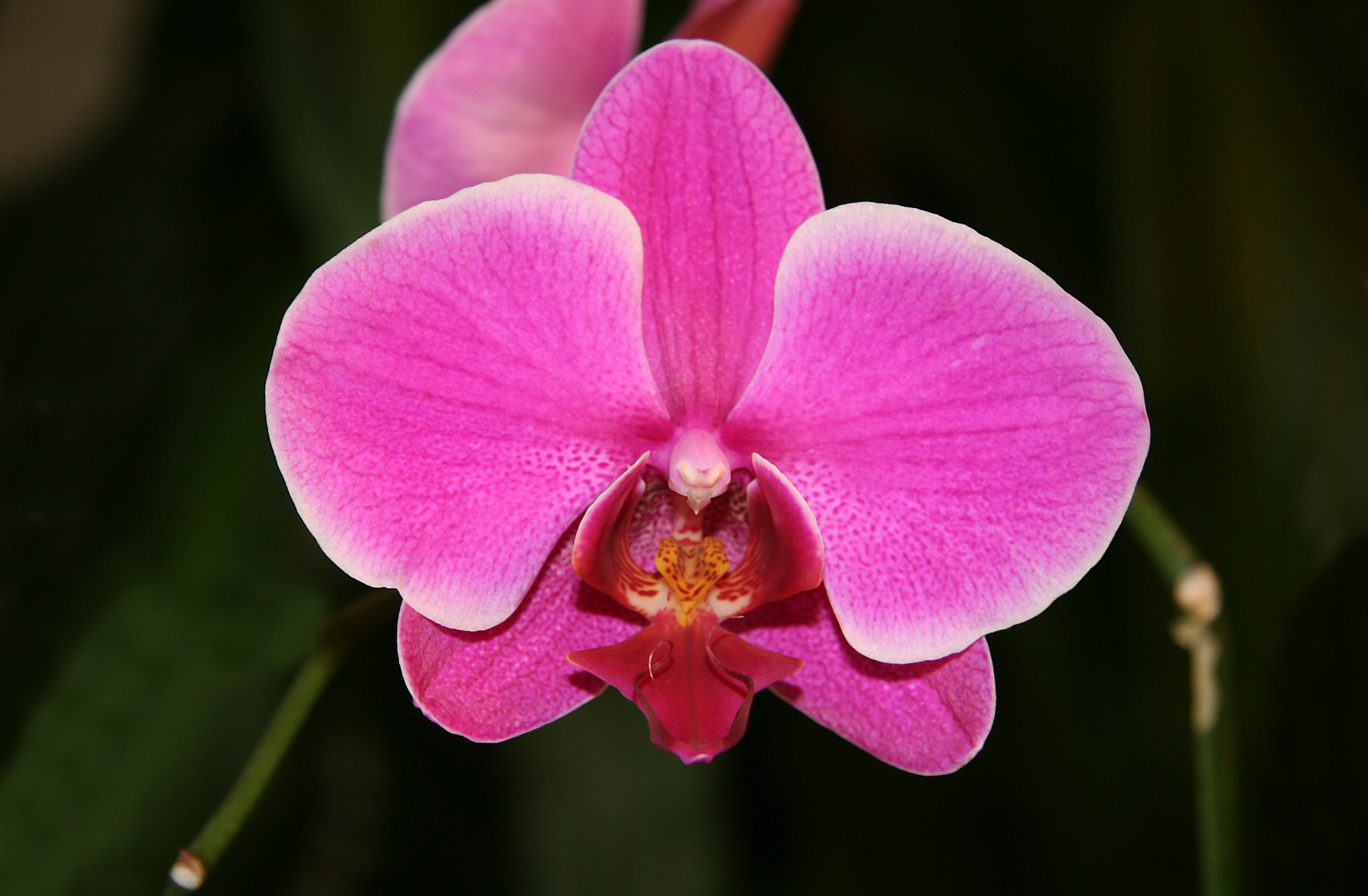
Orchid Phalaenopsis

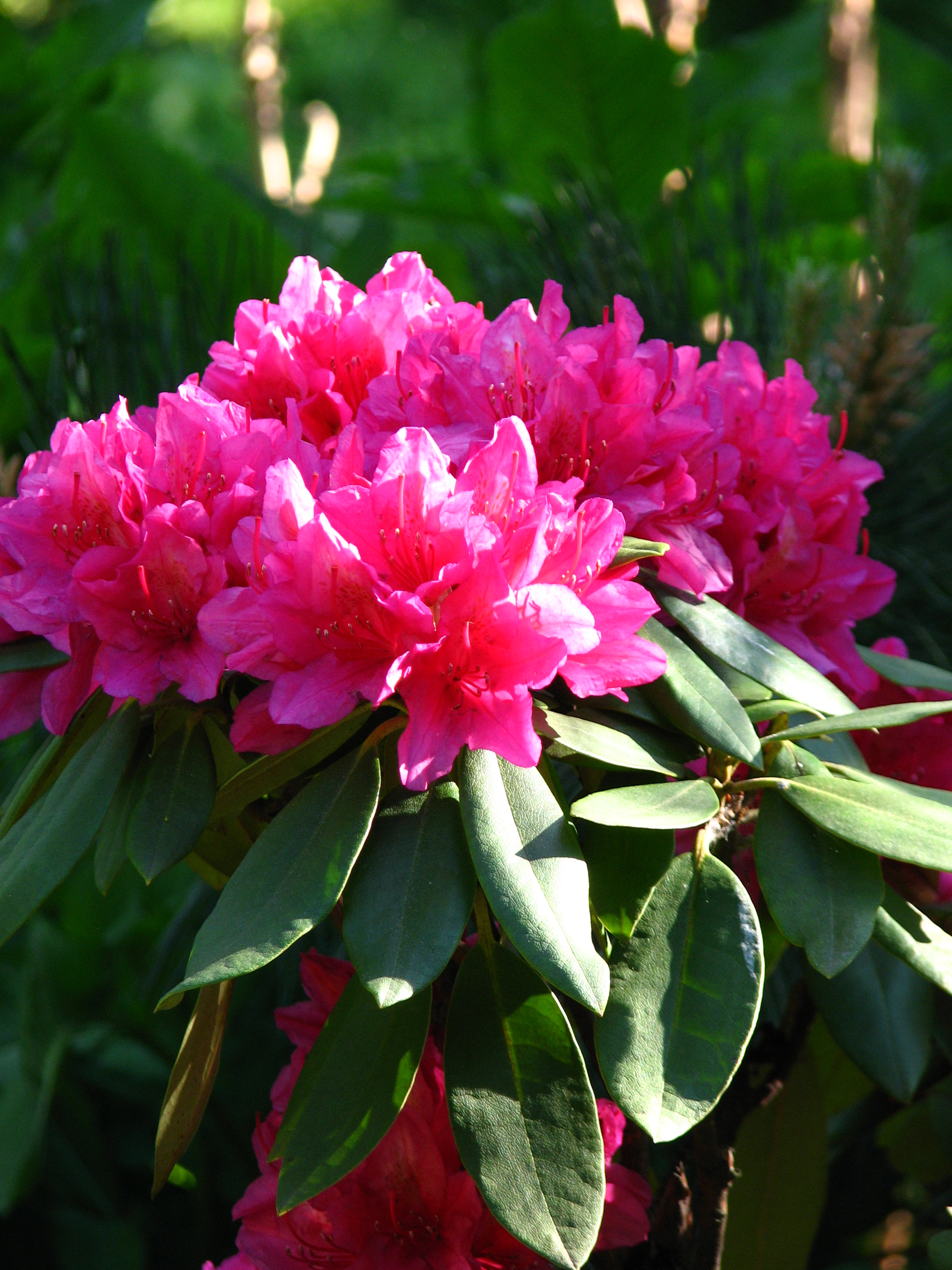
Rhododendron

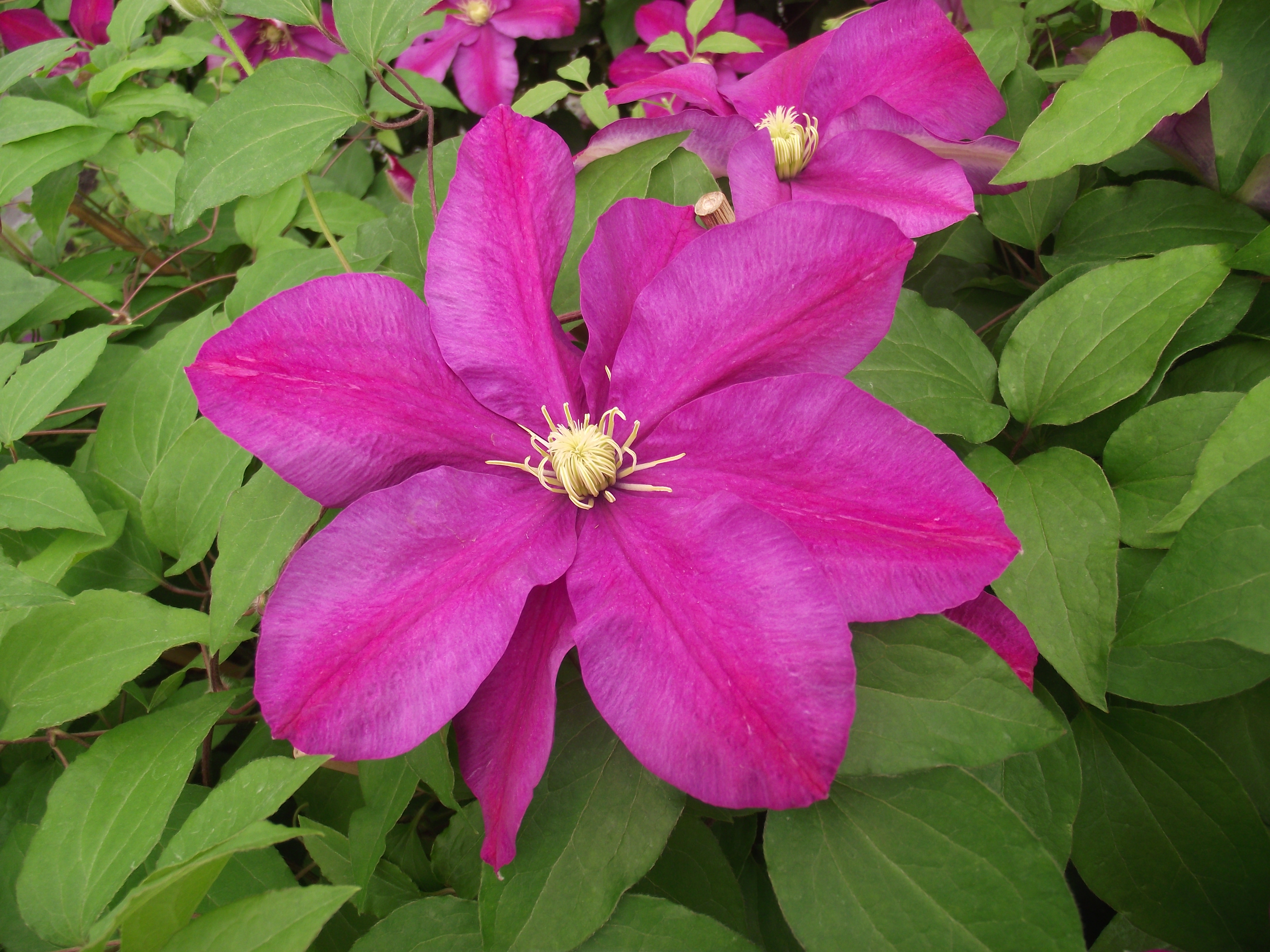
Clematis "Sunset"

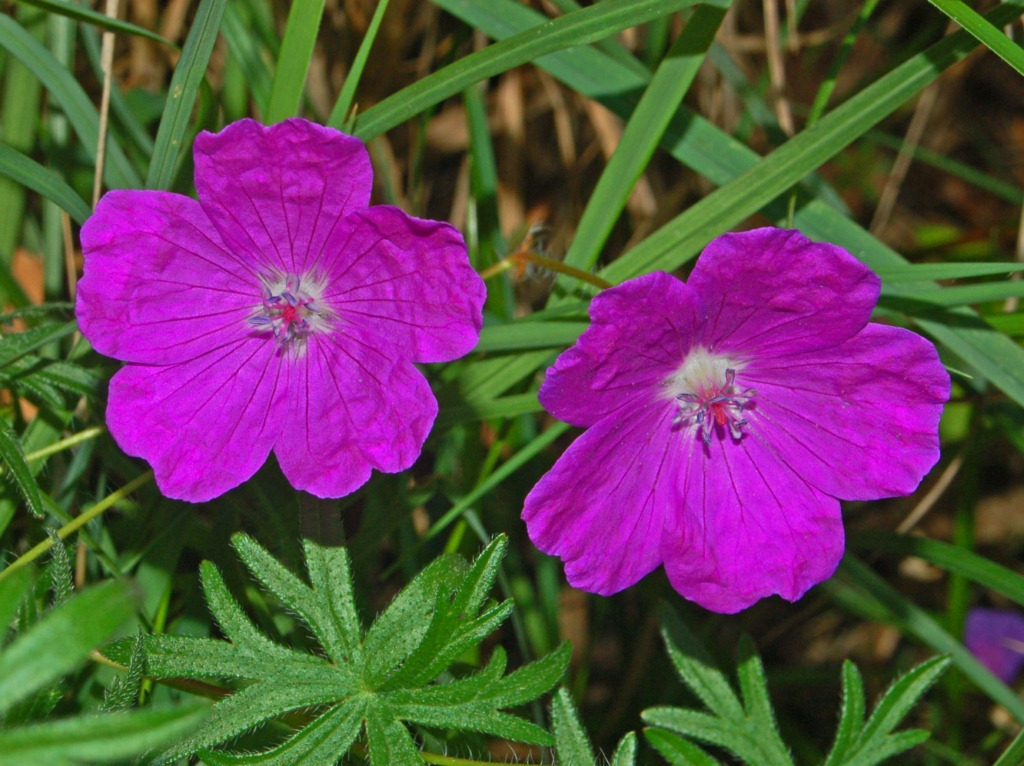
Geranium sanguineum

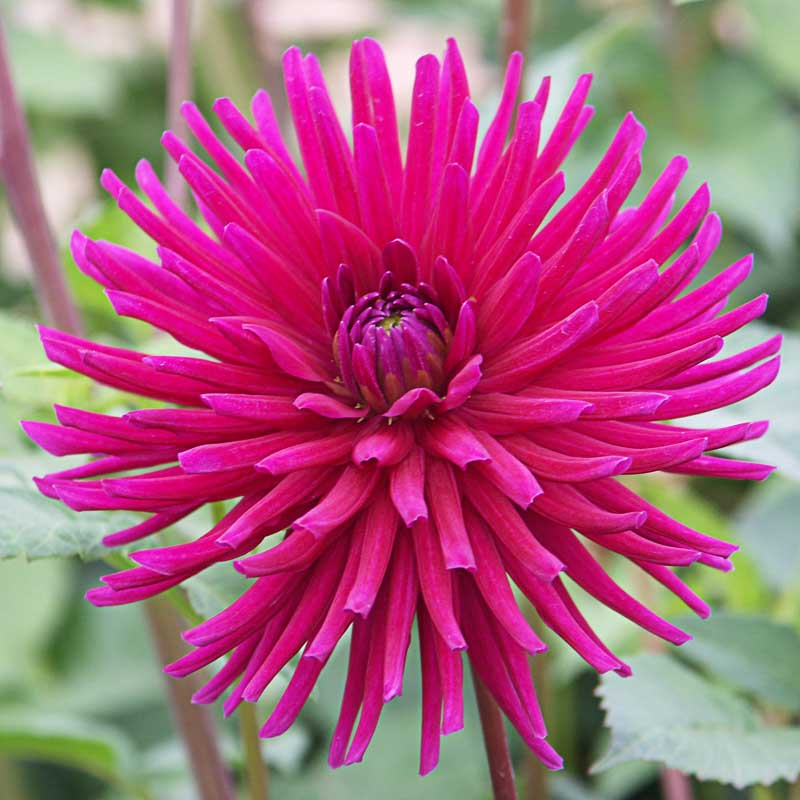
Dahlia "Hillcrest Royal"

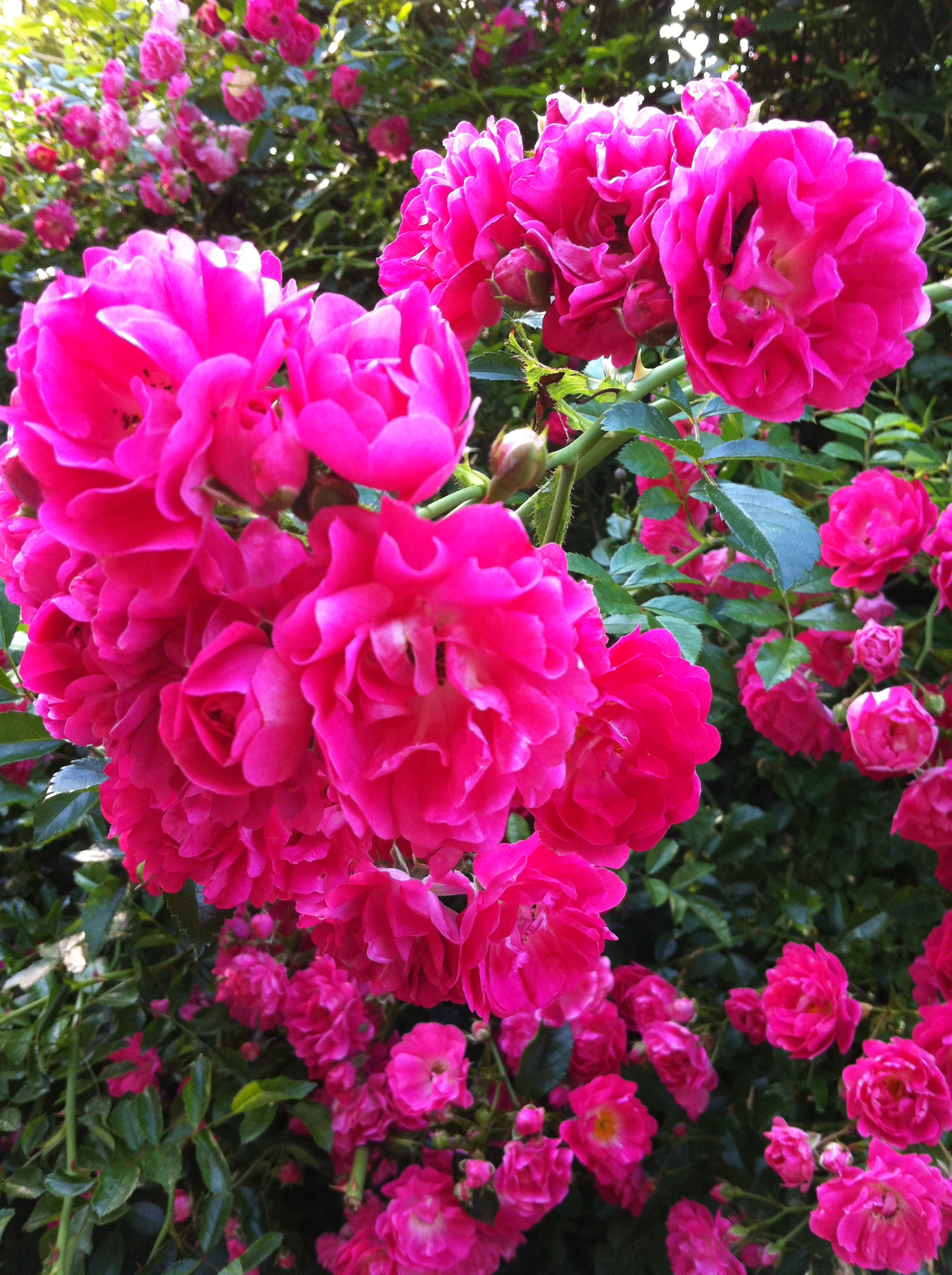
Rambler rose

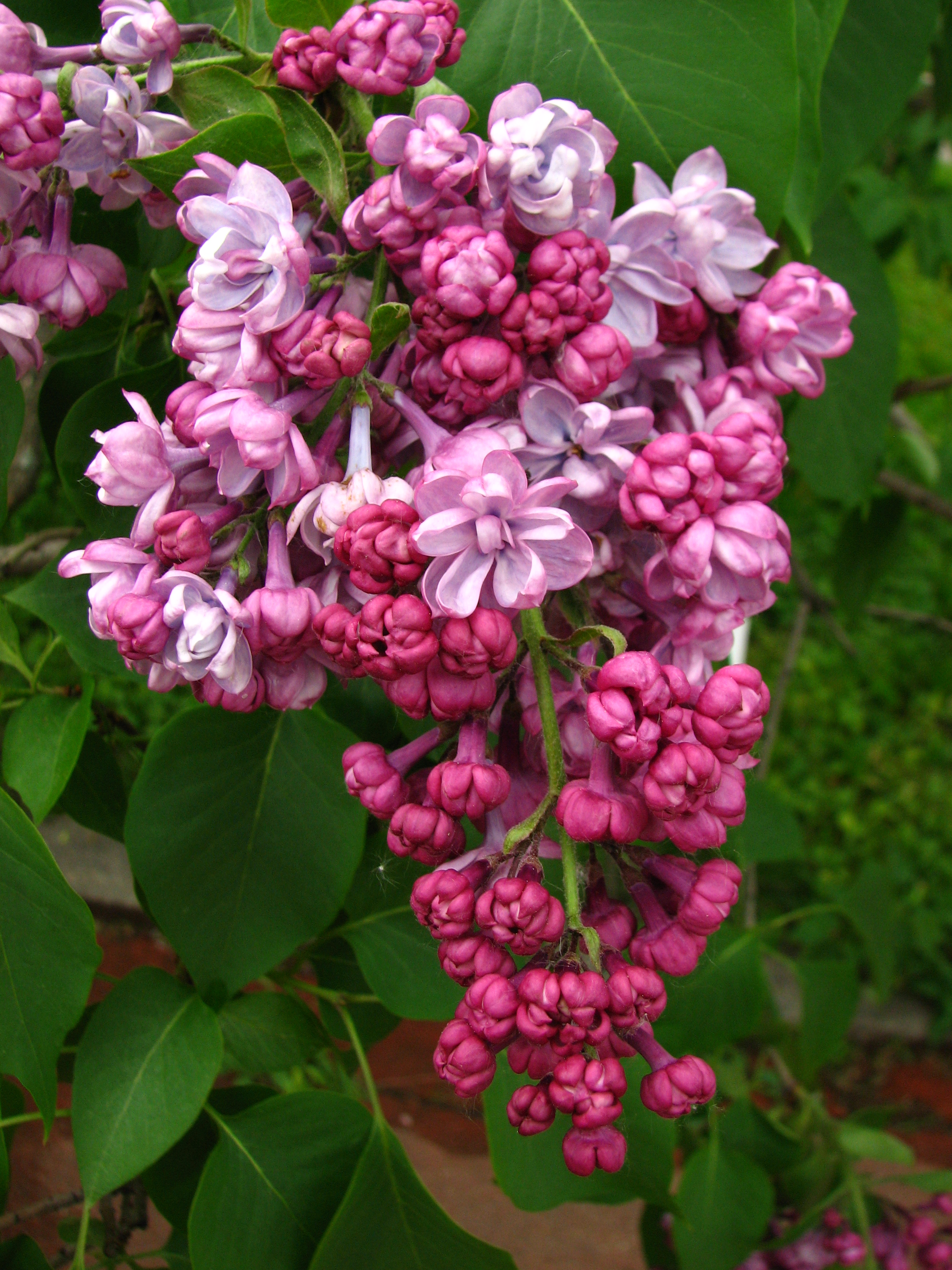
Syringa "Paul Deschanel"

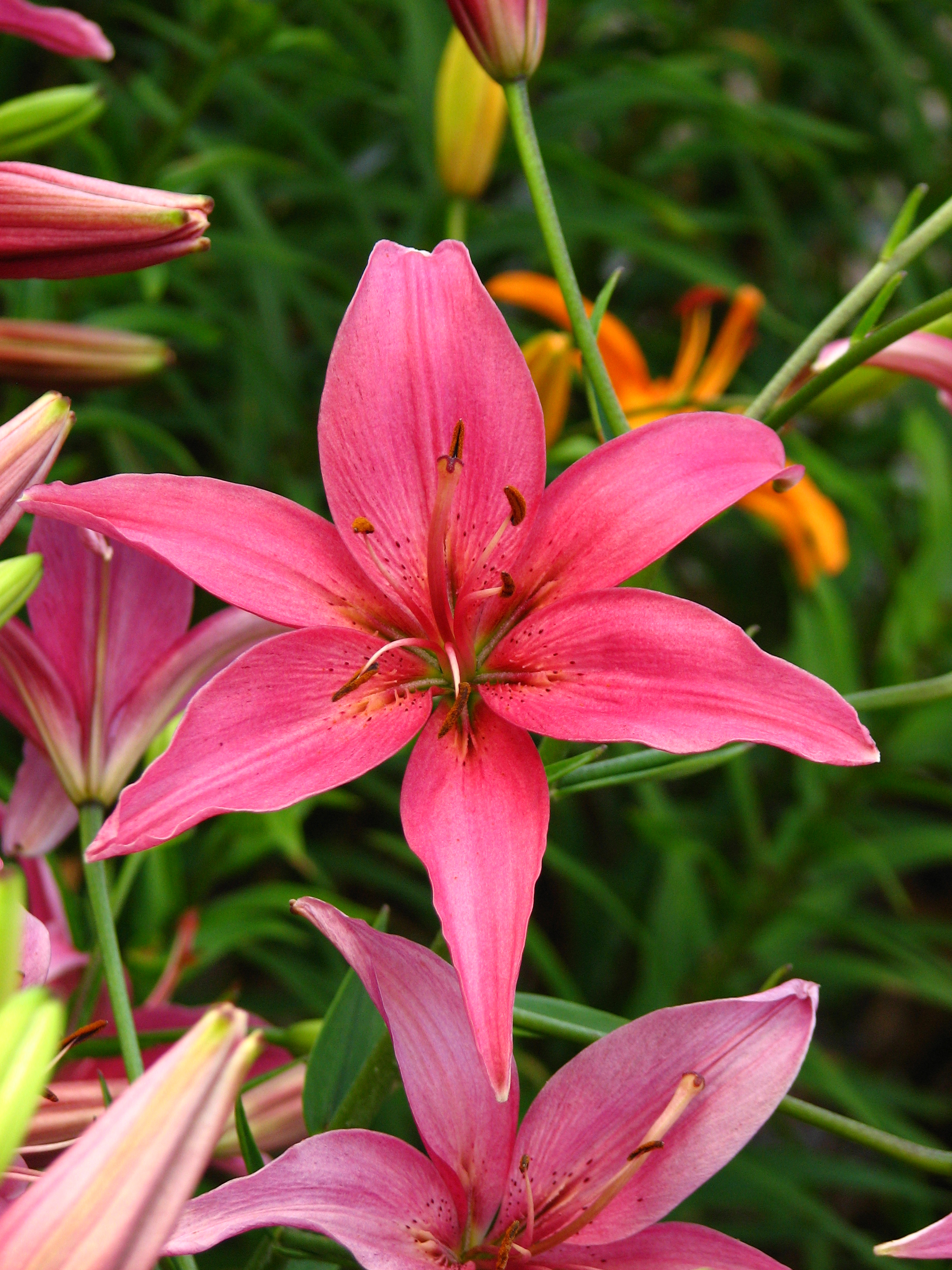
Lily "Malinoviy Zvon"

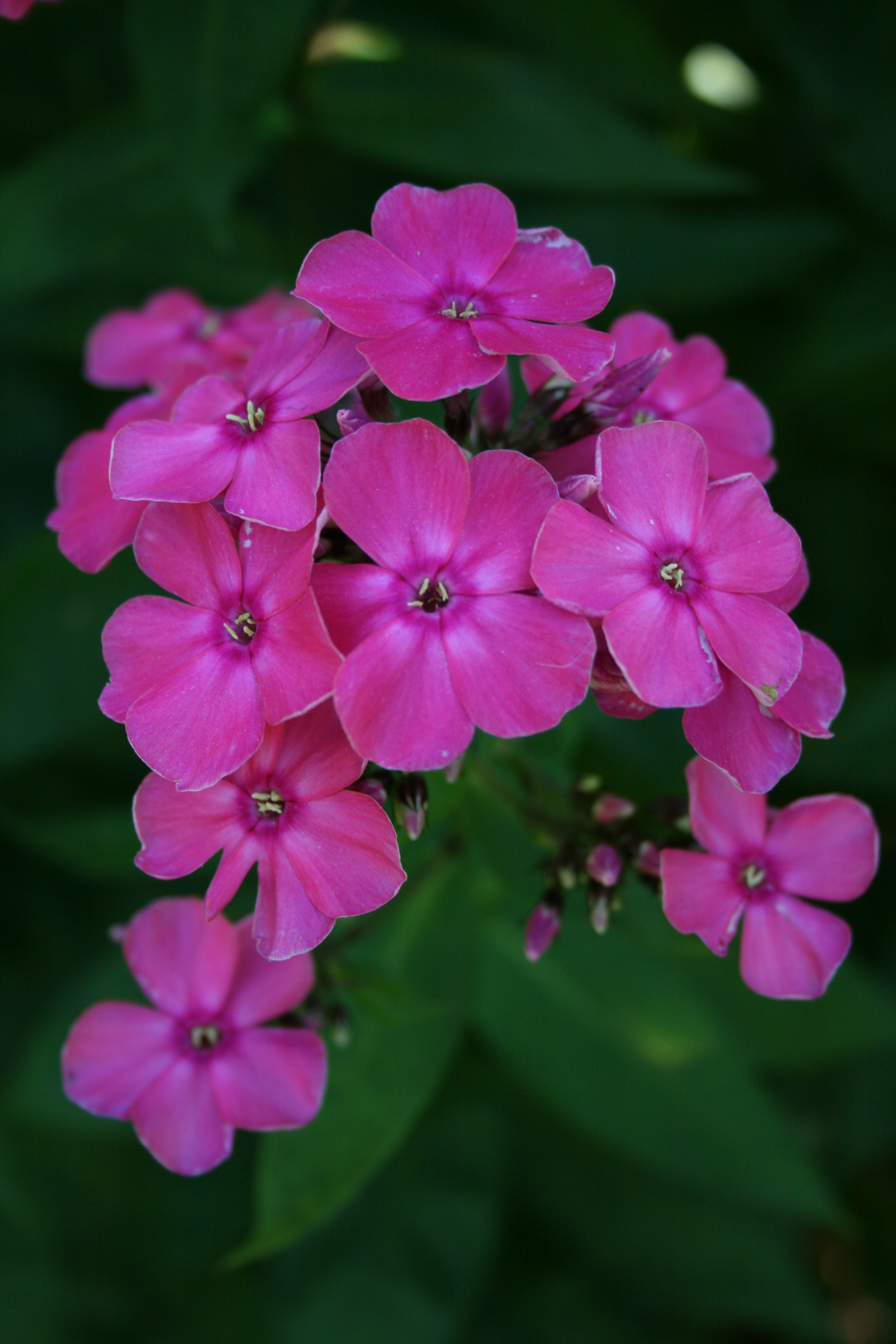
Polemoniaceae, or phlox

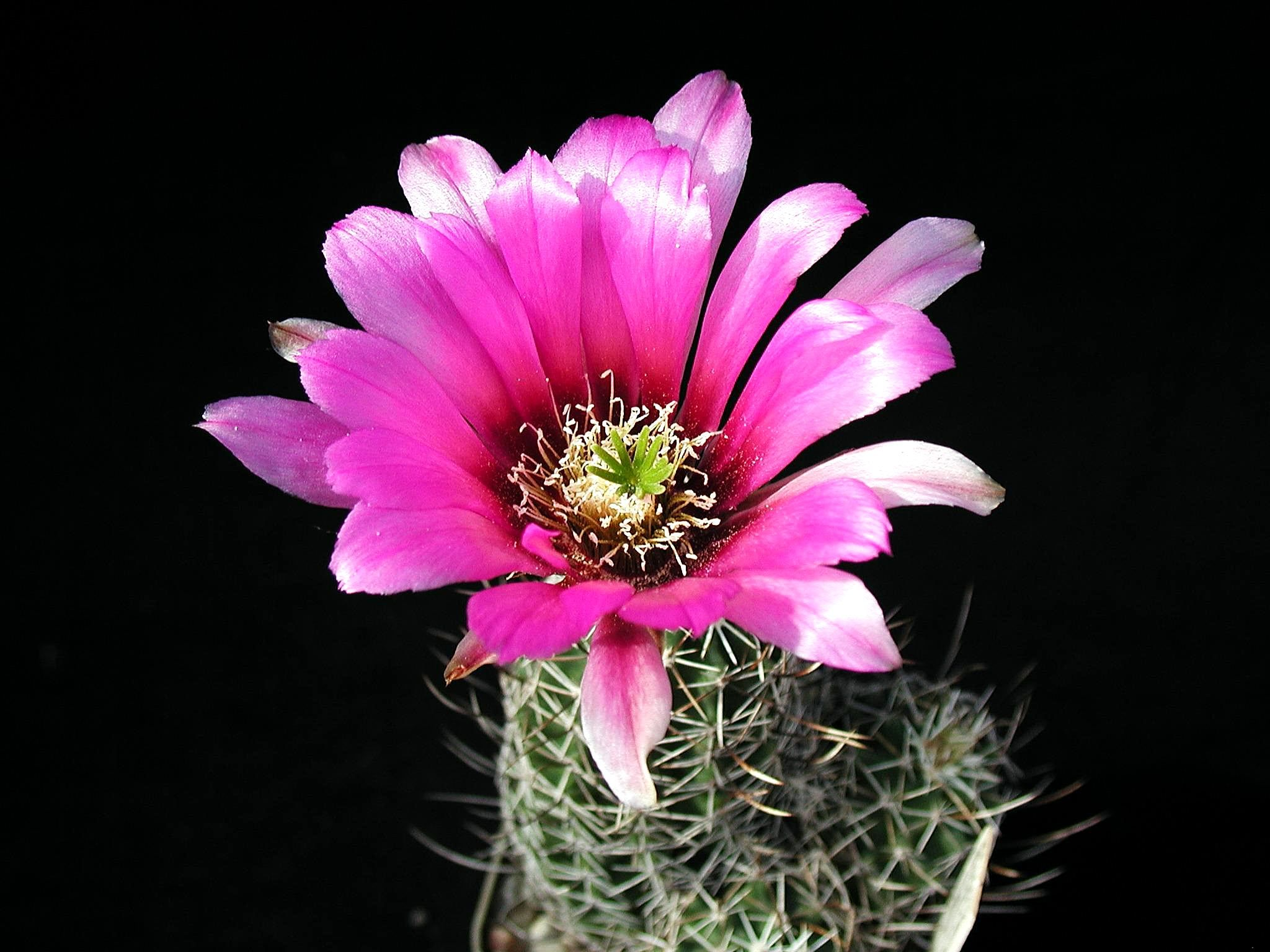
A cactus flower

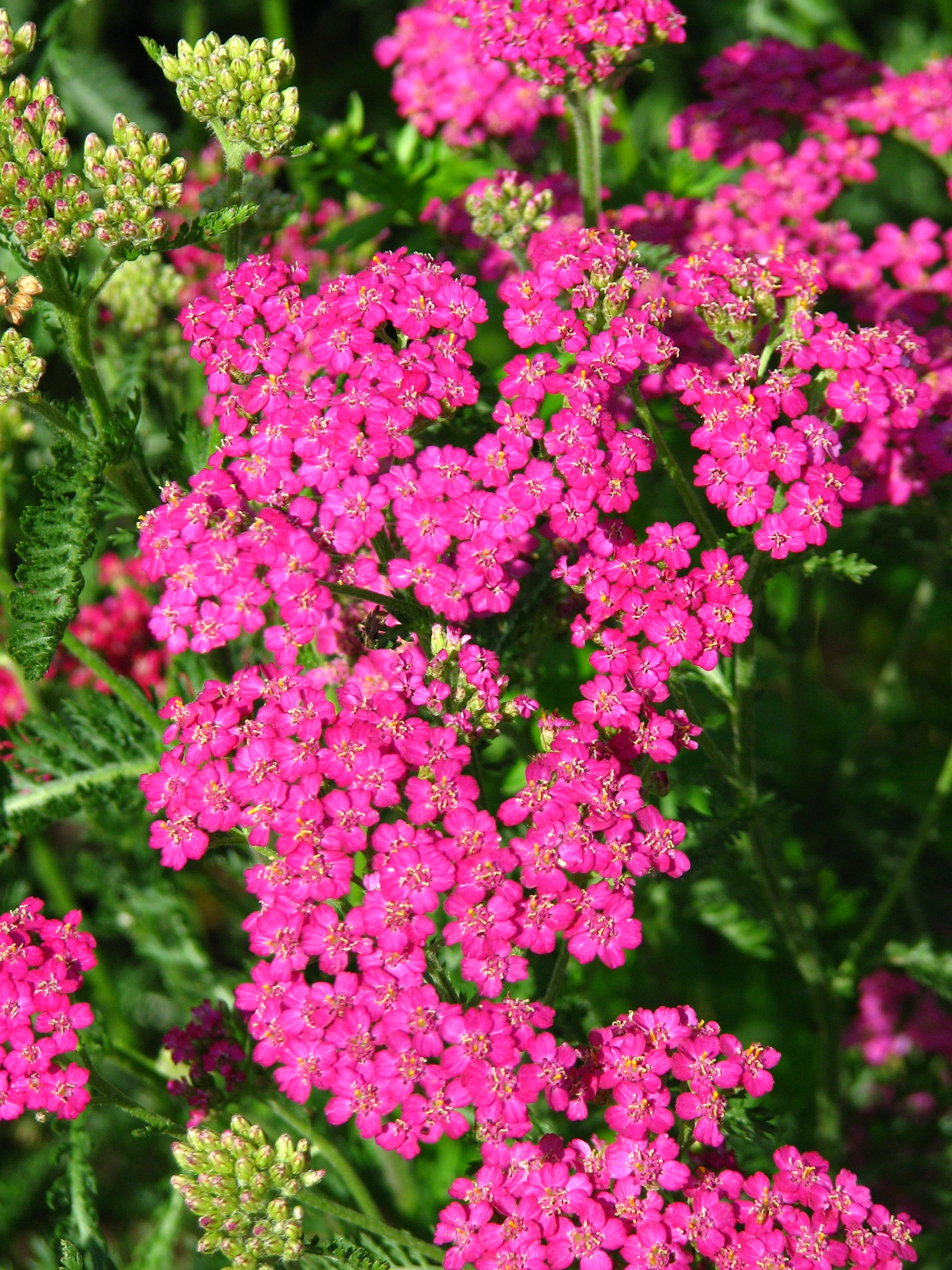
Achillea "Staroe Burgundskoe"

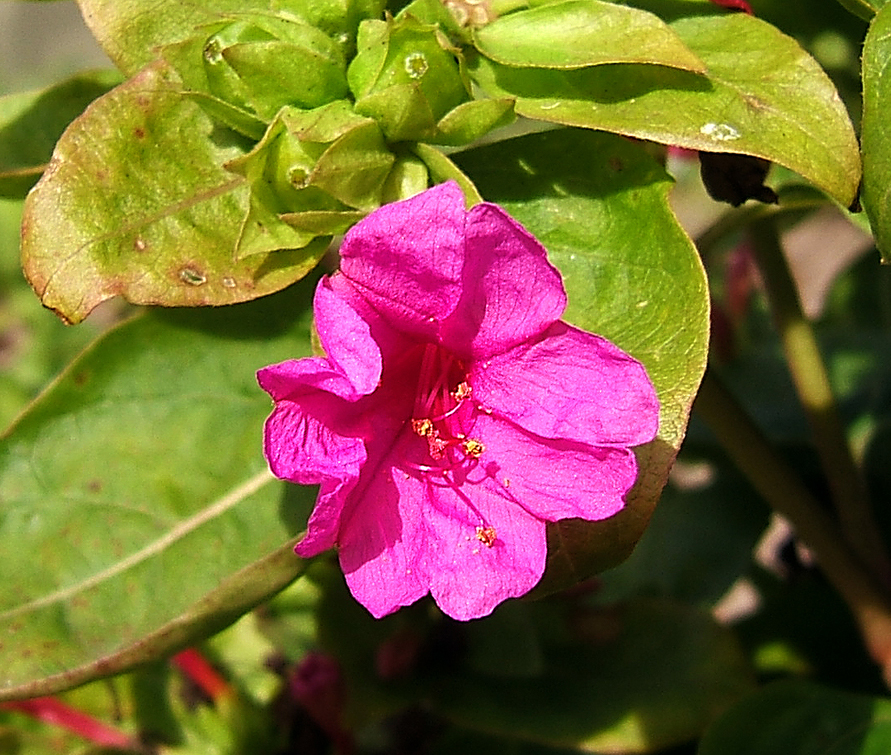
Mirabilis jalapa "Four O'Clock Flower"

=== In business ===
The German telecommunications company Deutsche Telekom uses a magenta logo. It has sought to prevent use of any similar color by other businesses, even those in unrelated fields, such as the insurance company Lemonade.

=== In public transport ===
Magenta was the English name of Tokyo's Oedo subway line color. It was later changed to ruby. It is also the color of the Metropolitan line of the London Underground.

=== In transportation ===
In aircraft autopilot systems, the path that a pilot or plane should follow to its destination is usually indicated in cockpit displays using the color magenta.

=== In numismatics ===
The Reserve Bank of India (RBI) issued a Magenta colored banknote of ₹2000 denomination on 8 November 2016 under Mahatma Gandhi New Series. This was one of the highest currency notes printed by RBI in India but is now discontinued.

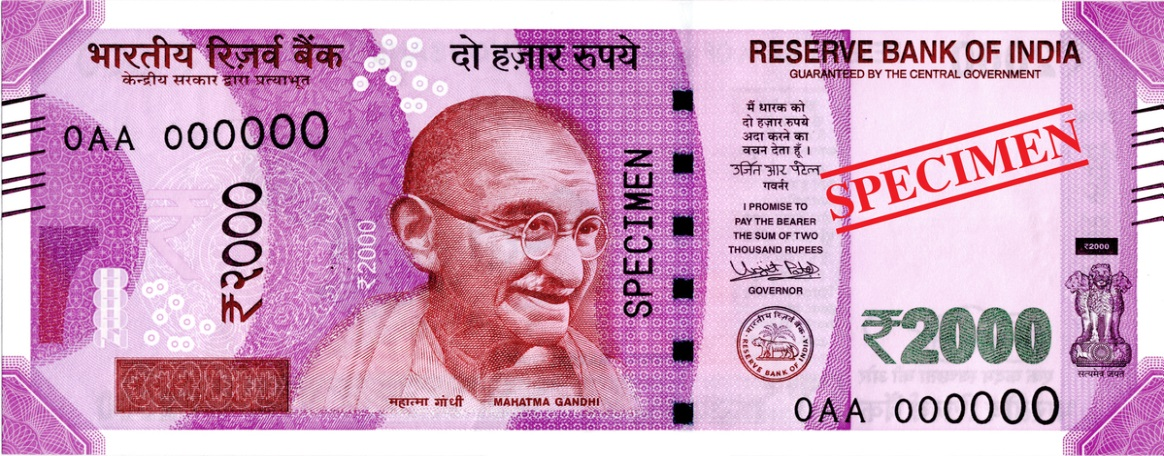
Indian 2000 rupee note, obverse

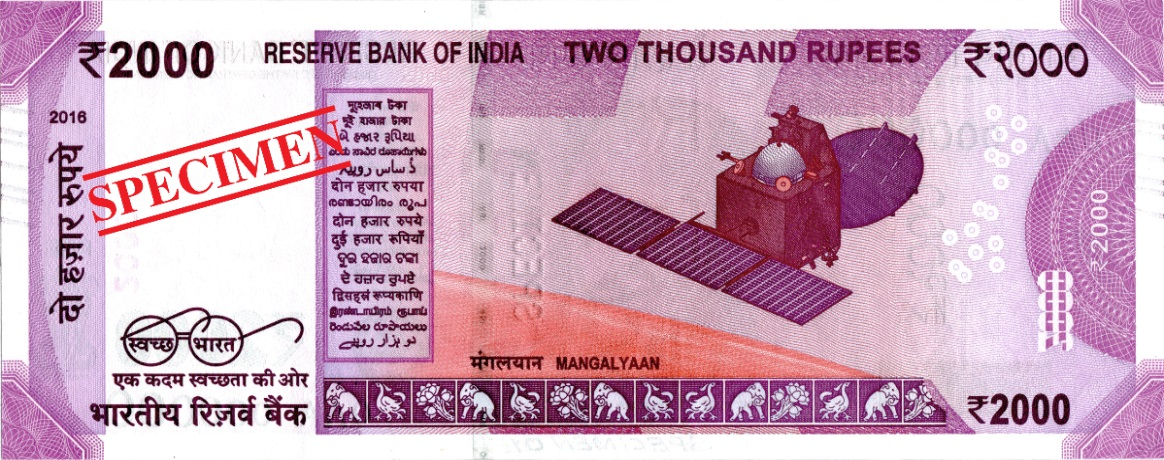
Indian 2000 rupee note, reverse

=== In vexillology and heraldry ===
Magenta is an extremely rare color to find on heraldic flags and coats of arms, since its adoption dates back to relatively recent times. However, there are some examples of its use:

Cantabrian Labarum, Cantabria, Spain.

Canting arms of the commune of Magenta, France.

Flag of the municipality of Cartago, Colombia.

=== In politics ===
The Austrian NEOS party flag

- Throughout much of Europe, the color of magenta (or variants of such, such as pink or amaranth) is used to symbolise social liberalism or classical liberalism
- The color magenta is used to symbolize anti-racism by the Amsterdam-based anti-racism Magenta Foundation.
- In Danish politics, magenta is the color of Det Radikale Venstre, the Danish social-liberal party.
- In Austrian politics, it is used to represent NEOS – The New Austria and Liberal Forum, a social liberal party.
- In Belgium, it is used by DéFI, a social liberal party.
- In Germany, Magenta was, until 2026, one of the colors of the Free Democratic Party, or FDP, a classical liberal party.
- In US, Magenta is used for a JewBelong campaign.

== See also ==
- Fuchsia (color)
- List of colors
- Rose
- Shades of magenta
