= JewBelong =

Nonprofit organization

- Formation: 2013; 13 years ago
- Founder: Archie Gottesman and Stacy Stuart
- Type: Nonprofit
- Legal status: 501(c)(3) organization
- Purpose: Cultural education and political advocacy
- Methods: Billboards
- Revenue: $4.95 M USD (2022)
- Expenses: $3.45 M USD (2022)
- Website: https://www.jewbelong.com

JewBelong is a nonprofit organization that is known for its billboards featuring slogans that celebrate Judaism, and support Israel. It is a tax-exempt corporation under Internal Revenue Code section 501(c)(3). It is registered since 2017 in Montclair, New Jersey.

== History ==
JewBelong was founded in 2013 by Archie Gottesman and Stacy Stuart, two Jewish marketing professionals who'd previously led Manhattan Mini Storage's viral billboard marketing.

JewBelong was founded with the stated mission of welcoming "disengaged Jews" back into Jewish religious and cultural life.

=== Antisemitism awareness campaigns ===
Beginning in late 2019 and early 2020, JewBelong expanded its programs to include antisemitism awareness campaigns, citing a rise in antisemitic events like the chants of "Jews will not replace us" at the August 2017 Unite the Right rally in Charlottesville and the shootings at a Pittsburgh synagogue and at a Jersey City kosher grocery store in October 2018 and December 2019, respectively.

One of JewBelong's early antisemitism-related campaigns was a digital display in Times Square, New York. JewBelong's messages included, "We're just 75 years since the gas chambers. So no, a billboard calling out antisemitism isn't an overreaction. #stopantisemitism" and "3,500 years of antisemitism doesn't make it right."

=== Israel ===
Since the October 7 attacks, Progressive American Jewish publications have noted an escalation in tone in JewBelong's advertising and an increased focused on Israel, which JewBelong itself has acknowledged.. Responding to comment on the new focus's contrast with JewBelong's historical focus on welcoming Jewish Americans, founder Gottesman said, "when people are anti-Israel, I don’t think JewBelong is for them".

== Reception and vandalism ==
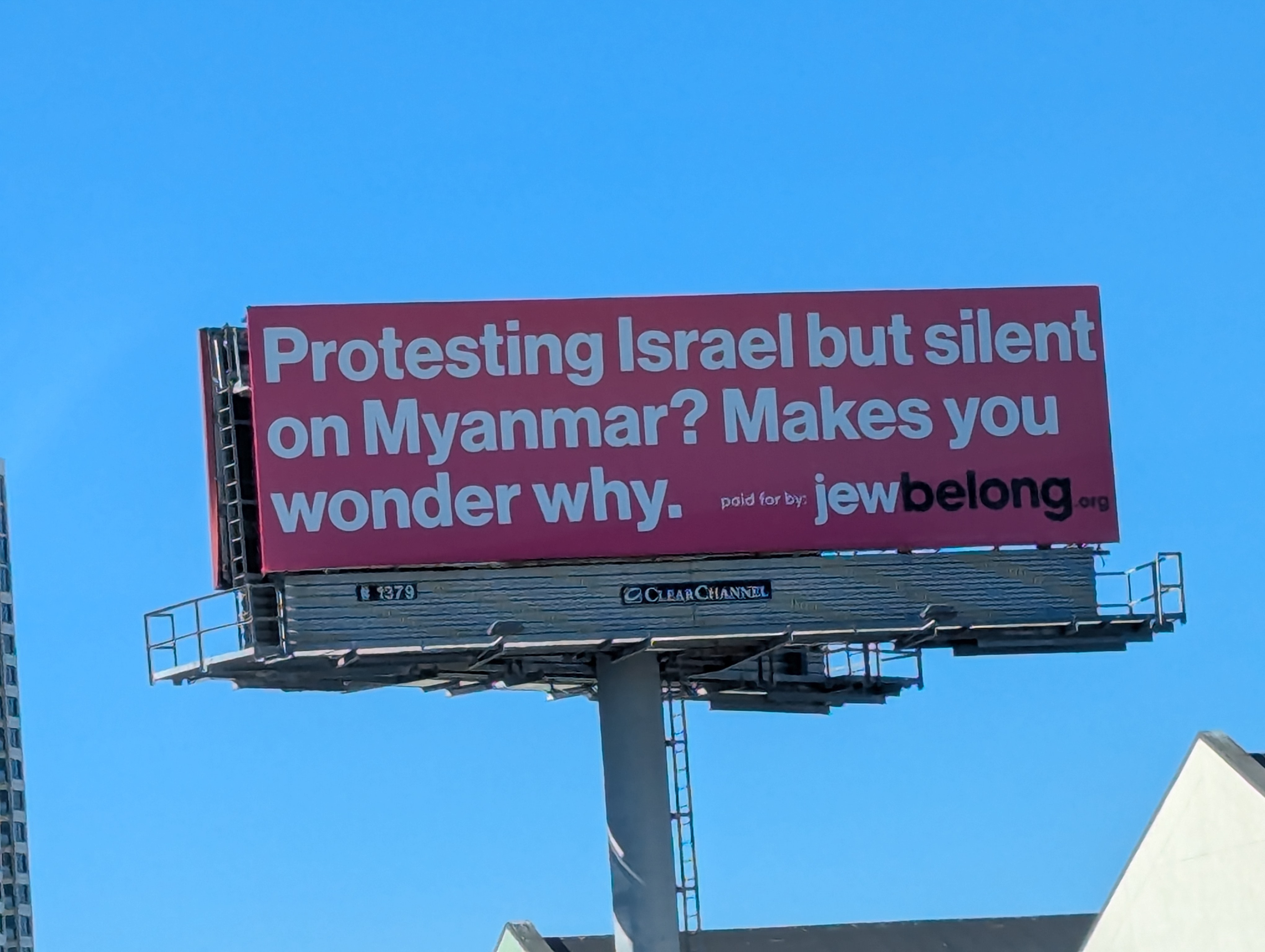
Billboard in Emeryville with pro-Israel slogan

JewBelong has gained some notoriety for its "edgy" advertisements, particularly billboards.

JewBelong posted on Instagram: "Trust Me. If Israel Wanted to Commit Genocide in Gaza, It Could." Slate's Emily Tamkin's called the post "menacing." JewBelong ultimately deleted the post the same day.

In 2023, JewBelong funded billboard ads that said, "You don't have to go to law school to know that anti-Zionism is antisemitism." In Berkeley, California, the billboards were subsequently vandalized with the phrases, "Jews4FreePalestine" and "Free Palestine". An anonymous anti-Zionist group claimed credit for vandalizing the billboard with anti-Israel graffiti. The Berkeley Police Department investigated the incident as a hate crime.

In 2024, JewBelong posted billboards near San Diego State University that referenced the 2024 pro-Palestinian protests on university campuses. One said "Remember when college was for losing your virginity, not your mind?" One community member, who declined to give their last name to CBS8 San Diego, said "I think it’s inappropriate. Not Judaism or anything. I just think having that there that’s the wrong message personally," while another person interviewed, Anthony Lovio, Blind Speed said, "I think it’s a good thing hopefully it reflects positives on the community." The rabbi at the Chabad House at SDSU said "I feel like maybe there could be a better way to really explain what is actually happening."

In January 2026, a billboard JewBelong posted in Los Angeles, near UCLA, that read "Being Jewish shouldn't require campus security," was vandalized with graffiti that read "End Zionism!" The LAPD investigated the incident as a felony hate crime.
