= Stoplight (disambiguation) =

A stoplight is a traffic signaling device.

Stoplight or Stop light may also refer to:

- Stop light party, a party where guests wear different colors
- Stoplight loosejaw, a deep-sea dragonfish
- Stoplight parrotfish, a species of marine ray-finned fish
- Stoplight Catone, a butterfly of the Nymphalidae
- Stop-Light: Five Noh Plays, five verse dramas by Paul Goodman
- Rear stop light, better known as stop lamps or brake lights
