= Flag of the Rohingya people =

Ethnic flag

Rohingya people
- Use: Ethnic flag
- Proportion: 2:3
- Adopted: Mid-20th century
- Design: Green field charged with an ancient Rohingya coin in the centre
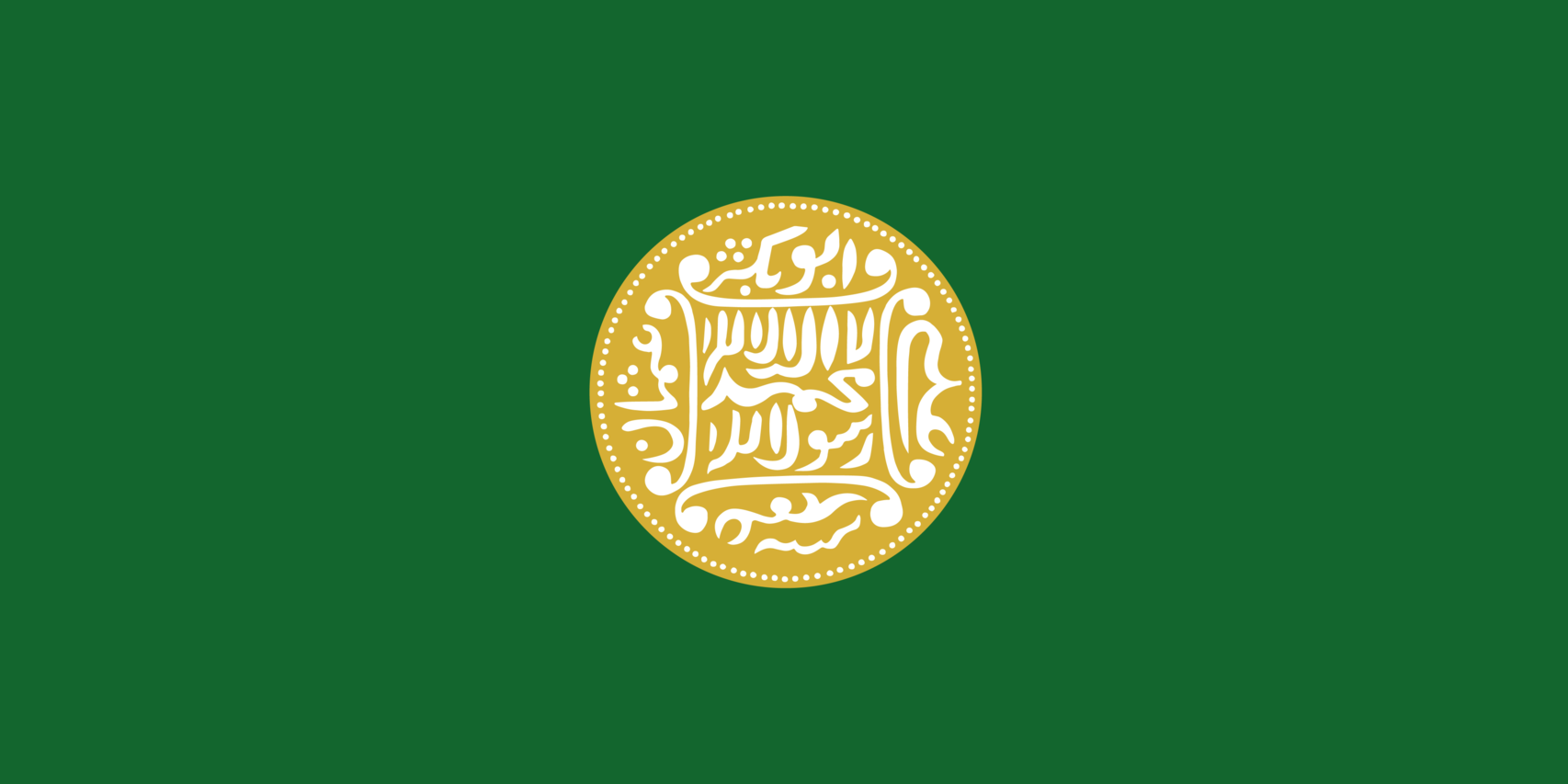
- Use: Wide variant
- Proportion: 1:2

The flag of the Rohingya people was created in the mid-20th century. It is used by Rohingya communities around the world.

== Design ==
The flag's design is a green field charged with a yellow coin containing a white inscription. The design of the coin is taken from an Arakanese coin from the 16th century. Green represents peace, gold represents prosperity, and white represents purity. The coin is a reference to coins used by Rohingya in the 16th century, and its Arabic text is the shahada surrounded by the names of the Four Righteous Caliphs of Islam: Abu Bakr (top), Umar (bottom), Uthman (left), and Ali (right). The obverse and reverse of the flag vary in order for the shahada to be able to be read properly on both sides.

=== Construction ===
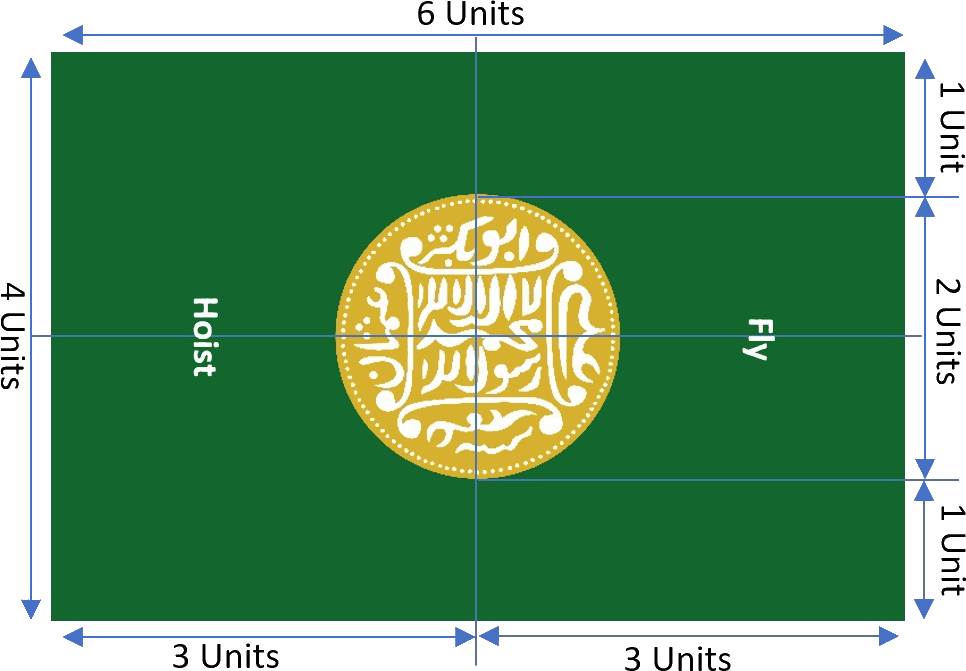

Standard colours of the Rohingya flag
Scheme	Green	Gold	White
Hexadecimal	#0B6623	#D4AF37	#FFFFFF
CMYK	89, 0, 66, 60	0, 17, 74, 17	0, 0, 0, 0
RGB	11, 102, 35	212, 175, 55	255, 255, 255
