= Faber Birren =

American author and consultant on color and color theory

- Born: 11 September 1900; Chicago, Illinois
- Died: 30 December 1988 (aged 88); Stamford, Connecticut
- Occupation: Color theorist

Faber Birren (11 September 1900 – 30 December 1988) was an American writer and consultant on color and color theory.

== Life ==
Faber Birren was born in Chicago, Illinois on 11 September 1900, the son of Joseph P. Birren, a landscape painter, and Crescentia (Lang) Birren, a pianist. He attended the Art Institute of Chicago while in high school and the University of Chicago for two years where he studied color theory.

He began publishing articles on color in 1924; his first book, Color in Vision was published in 1928.

In 1934 he established his own company and worked as an industrial color consultant, advising clients on the psychological effects of color on safety, employee morale, productivity and sales. His recommendations included changing wall and interior colors to reduce visual fatigue, and using bright colors on machinery to reduce accidents. DuPont, Monsanto, and General Electric were among his clients as well as the military.

He also wrote extensively on color, writing forty books and over 250 articles on the subject.

Birren died in Stamford, Connecticut on 30 December 1988 after a stroke.

== Personal ==
Birren married Wanda Martin and they had two daughters, Zoe and Fay.

== Bibliography ==
- Color in Vision (1928).
- The Printers Art of Color (1934). Chicago: Crimson Press.
- Functional Color (1937). New York: The Crimson Press.
- Color Psychology and Color Therapy (1950). New York: McGraw-Hill.
- New Horizons in Color (1955). New York: Reinhold Pub. Corp.
- Creative Color (1961). Van Nostrand Reinhold.
- Color in Your World (1962). New York: Crowell-Collier Publishing Co.
- Color: A Survey in Words and Pictures, from Ancient Mysticism to Modern Science (1963). New York: University Books.
- History of Color in Painting (1965). New York: Reinhold Pub. Corp. lccn 64–22424
- Principles of Color: A Review of Past Traditions and Modern Theories of Color Harmony (1969). Van Nostrand Reinhold. ISBN 9780442207748
- Ostwald: The Color Primer (1969). Van Nostrand Reinhold.
- Color and Human Response (1978). Van Nostrand Reinhold. ISBN 9780442207878
- The Textile Colorist (1980). Van Nostrand Reinhold. ISBN 9780442238544
- Light, Color, and Environment (1982) Van Nostrand Reinhold. ISBN 9780442212704
- Color Perception in Art (1986). Schiffer Publishing. ISBN 9780442207823
- The Symbolism of Color (1988). Citadel. ISBN 9780806511092
- Light, Color, and Environment (1988). Schiffer Publishing. ISBN 9780887401312
- The Elements of Color: A Treatise on the Color System of Johannes Itten Based on His Book The Art of Color (1970). Johannes Itten, and Faber Birren. New York: Van Nostrand Reinhold. ISBN 0442240384
- The Principles of Light and Color: The Classic Study of the Healing Power of Color (1967) by Edwin D. Babbitt; edited and annotated by Faber Birren. New York; University Books.

== Legacy ==
In 1971, Birren donated nearly two hundred books about color, many of them rare, to the Yale University Library. He also established an endowment for color research.
