= Ogden Rood =

American physicist (1831–1902)

Ogden Nicholas Rood
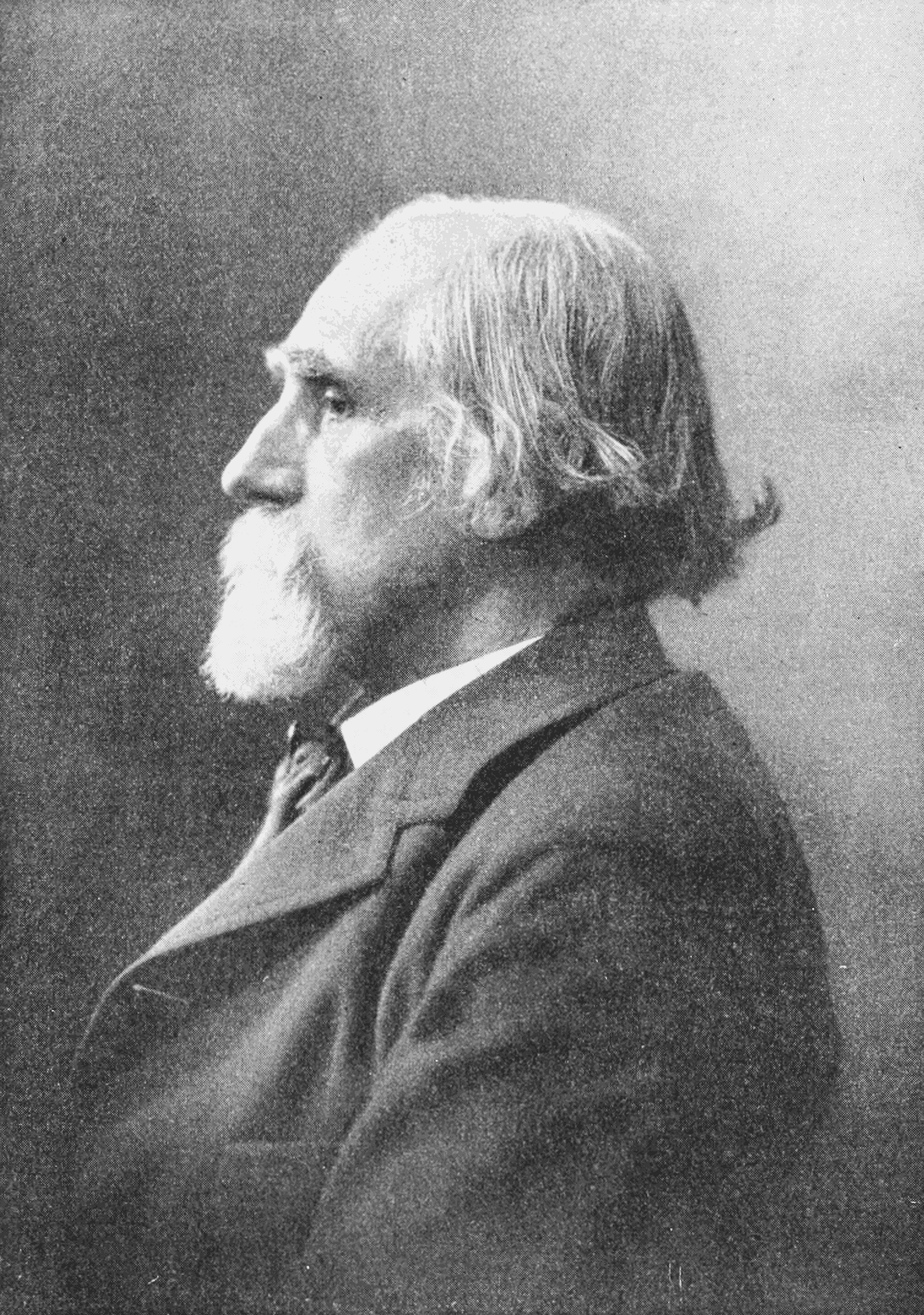
- Born: February 3, 1831; Danbury, Connecticut, U.S.
- Died: November 12, 1902 (aged 71)
- Education: Yale University; Princeton University
- Scientific career
- Fields: Physics

Ogden Nicholas Rood (3 February 1831 in Danbury, Connecticut – 12 November 1902 in Manhattan) was an American physicist best known for his work in color theory.

== Career ==
At age 18, Rood became a student at Yale University, but after his sophomore year he transferred to Princeton University (then called the College of New Jersey), where he received his baccalaureate degree in 1852. For the next two years he was successively a graduate student at Yale University, an assistant at the University of Virginia, and an assistant to Benjamin Silliman. In 1854–1858, he lived in Germany, dividing his time between oil painting and academic studies in Berlin and Munich, working in the laboratory of Justus von Liebig. In 1858, shortly before returning to the U.S.A., he married Mathilde Prunner of Munich. In 1858 he joined the faculty of the short-lived Troy University. After the closure of Troy University in 1861, and after a one year absence from the academic world, he attained an appointment as Chair of Physics at Columbia University, a position he held from 1863 until his death. In 1865 Rood was elected a member of the National Academy of Sciences. In 1869 he became a vice-president of the American Association for the Advancement of Science.

He was elected as a member to the American Philosophical Society in 1880.

== Legacy ==
In his book on color theory, Modern Chromatics, with Applications to Art and Industry (published in 1879, with German and French translations appearing in 1880 and 1881, respectively) Rood divided color into three constants: purity, luminosity, and hue—equivalent to James Clerk Maxwell's tint, shade, and hue. As an amateur artist, Rood was a member of the American Watercolor Society. In 1874 he gave two lectures to the National Academy of Design in New York on "Modern Optics in Painting". Along with Maxwell and Michel Eugène Chevreul, Rood's work was an influence on the Impressionist artists and their successors. The painter Camille Pissarro defined the aim of the Neo-Impressionists in a letter: "To seek a modern synthesis of methods based on science, that is, based on M. Chevreul's theory of colour and on the experiments of Maxwell and the measurements of N.O. Rood."

Rood's theory of contrasting colors was particularly influential on Georges-Pierre Seurat, the founder of Neo-Impressionism and the foremost Pointillist. Rood suggested that small dots or lines of different colors, when viewed from a distance, would blend into a new color. He believed that the complementary colors of his color wheel, when applied in pairs by the artist, would enhance the presence of a painting: "... paintings, made up almost entirely of tints that by themselves seem modest and far from brilliant, often strike us as being rich and gorgeous in colour, while, on the other hand, the most gaudy colours can easily be arranged so as to produce a depressing effect on the beholder.". William Innes Homer considered Seurat was influenced by passages in Ogden Rood's Students' Text-book of Color; Or, Modern Chromatics, with Applications to Art and Industry.

In his 1912 Color Standards and Color Nomenclature, Robert Ridgway named four colors for Rood: Rood’s Blue, Rood’s Brown, Rood’s Lavender, and Rood’s Violet.
