= On Colors =

Treatise attributed to Aristotle

On Colors (Greek Περὶ χρωμάτων; Latin De Coloribus) is a treatise attributed to Aristotle but sometimes ascribed to Theophrastus or Strato. The work outlines the theory that all colors (yellow, red, purple, blue, and green) are derived from mixtures of black and white. On Colors had a pronounced impact on subsequent color theories and remained influential until Isaac Newton's experiments with light refraction.

== Section 1 Summary ==
Aristotle states in his account that the colors of the basic elements are simple, water and air are naturally white while gold is the color of fire and similar things like the sun are golden, meanwhile more complicated colors are the result of mixtures of these elements. By nature, the Earth is white but is dyed by these mixtures of the natural elements. However, unlike other colors black is not the result of a mixture between natural elements but rather "black belongs to the elements of things while they are undergoing a transformation of their nature." Pseudo-Aristotle, de Coloribus 1.1

Aristotle writes that black appears in three different ways. First, something is naturally black when light is reflected off it as black. Secondly, black appears in the absence of light being able to reach the eye. Thirdly, when very little light is reflected all things can look black. Aristotle uses the example of how rough water appears dark because the roughness of the water's surface allows very little light to bounce off. In the same vein, deep water and large clouds appear black because light cannot penetrate them resulting in little light reflecting off and giving them their black color. Aristotle concludes this explanation of the color black by saying that in the cases where light cannot penetrate deeply results in darkness or what we call black, but darkness itself is not a color but merely the absence of light. Pseudo-Aristotle, de Coloribus 1.2

Light does not have a color but all colors are visible because of it. Elements like fire or other things that produce light all have light as their color. Relating back to the elements, when burned by fire air and water turn black. Such is the burning coals when doused in water. This is Aristotle's explanation of simple colors. Pseudo-Aristotle, de Coloribus

== Section 2 Summary ==
The second section of On Colors gives a description of mixtures and starts with examples of red and purple. Aristotle writes that red is the result of something black and shady being mixed with light, when black coals are burned they take on a red color. His reasoning being when something black is mixed with the light of the sun or fire the result will always be red. Purple results when weak rays of light mix with something light and shady, such as at sunrise or sunset when weak rays of light hit the air that is trying to darken. Pseudo-Aristotle, de Coloribus 2.1

Aristotle theorizes that simple colors are the result of mixtures between varying levels of light and either black or white. Compound colors are colors that are a mixture of light and black/white but also with a simple color mixed in as well that gives a unique appearance. Aristotle lays out a method of closely examining variations in compound colors based on what prepared them (i.e., purple sky vs purple wine), essentially finding similarities in the process that creates similar colors. Aristotle makes the distinction that this method is not meant to examine the mixing of colors in the way that painters mix them on a palette but rather by comparing the varying proportions of light rays from fire, sun, etc. Pseudo-Aristotle, de Coloribus 2.2

== Section 3 Summary ==
In the third section, Aristotle delves deeper into the explanation of how the disproportionate quantities of light, calling the varying levels of light and shade a quantitative difference. Different light and shade quantities result in wide variations of a single color. He describes shining as the "continuity and intensity of light" There is a gap in the text that cuts off more of this description of shining. The text resumes partway through a description of the dyeing process. Pseudo-Aristotle, de Coloribus 3.1

The passage moves onto how we do not see pure colors because they are all either mixed with different colors or seen in different levels of light and shade. Consequently, the color will look different when viewed in direct light or hidden in shade and the source of light can also play a role such as a color seen lit up by fire light or moonlight rays. Aristotle finishes this section by stating that the colors we see are a result of three things; light from any source, the medium through which the light is seen such as air or water, and the colors that make up the ground/area which the light reflects off of. Pseudo-Aristotle, de Coloribus 3.2

== Section 4 Summary ==
The fourth section is the shortest and briefly describes dyeing. It makes two major points. One, an object takes the color of what it is dyed with, dyes both in nature and with man-made items. To dye something, typically with flowers, the colored plant is mixed with heat and water. Two, while the material of something may take on a color the space between doesn't; for example, the wool of a sweater takes on the color but the gaps between threads cannot be dyed. These gaps in between are not visible but affect the color's appearance color. Pseudo-Aristotle, de Coloribus 4.1

== Section 5 Summary ==
The fifth section starts by describing in detail the color of plants. Aristotle claims that by nature the primary color of all plant life is green. There is a brief relation to how stagnant and dries up it turns green when mixed with sunlight. When left for some time this green water gradually turns black but will take on a green color when mixed with fresh water. This is true for anything moist or containing water such as plant life, it is this process that gives plants their green color. The water in the plants turns green when hit with rays of the sun and the older parts of the plants blacken a little from age. Pseudo-Aristotle, de Coloribus 5.1

However, the shoots and roots which remain underground do not receive sunlight light so instead of turning green they remain white which is the base color of plants before any mixture. Essentially, plants get their color from how the liquids/juices inside them react with rays of light and even temperature. Moving onto fruits, Aristotle writes about once a fruit has finished growing the process of changing color begins. A fruit can no longer grow when heat cannot control the flow of food into the fruit. At this point, fruits take their color when the juices inside them are warmed by the sun and the heat of the surrounding atmosphere, similar to the process by which things are dyed with colored flowers. Pseudo-Aristotle, de Coloribus 5.2

== Section 6 Summary ==
The sixth and final section of Aristotle's de Coloribus covers the color of man's and animals' skin, hair, and plumage (feathering). They act on a similar principle to that of plants. White hair occurs when the moister that possesses its own natural coloring dries up and black when the moister about the skin grows old without drying out because of its quantity. Sometimes, the moisture will dry up before it gets too old resulting in red, yellow, grey, and other colors. Pseudo-Aristotle, de Coloribus 6.1

The hair and feathering of people and animals are directly related to the color of skin as well as other features like hooves, bills, horns, and talons. In black animals these are black and in white animals these features are white. The food supply that runs beneath the surface greatly impacts what color an organism will take. In people or creatures with long hair, the roots which are closer to the flow of food are noticeably darker than the extremities of the hair. Pseudo-Aristotle, de Coloribus 6.2

In babies and the elderly, they have whiter hair and skin due to weakness and lack of sustenance flowing through them. As they age these features will darken as they consume more food. Black creatures are typically stronger than white ones, the dark color displays an abundance of sustenance which makes them more nourished. Some animals like horses and dogs remain very strong despite their white color. Pseudo-Aristotle, de Coloribus 6.3

Creatures are born black because they are born with sustenance from the start but they will still darken further when they reach their prime when the heat within them is at its strongest. Pseudo-Aristotle, de Coloribus 6.4

== See also ==
- Corpus Aristotelicum
