= Complementary colors =

Pairs of colors losing hue when combined

Complementary colors in the RGB and CMY color models

Complementary colors in the traditional RYB color model

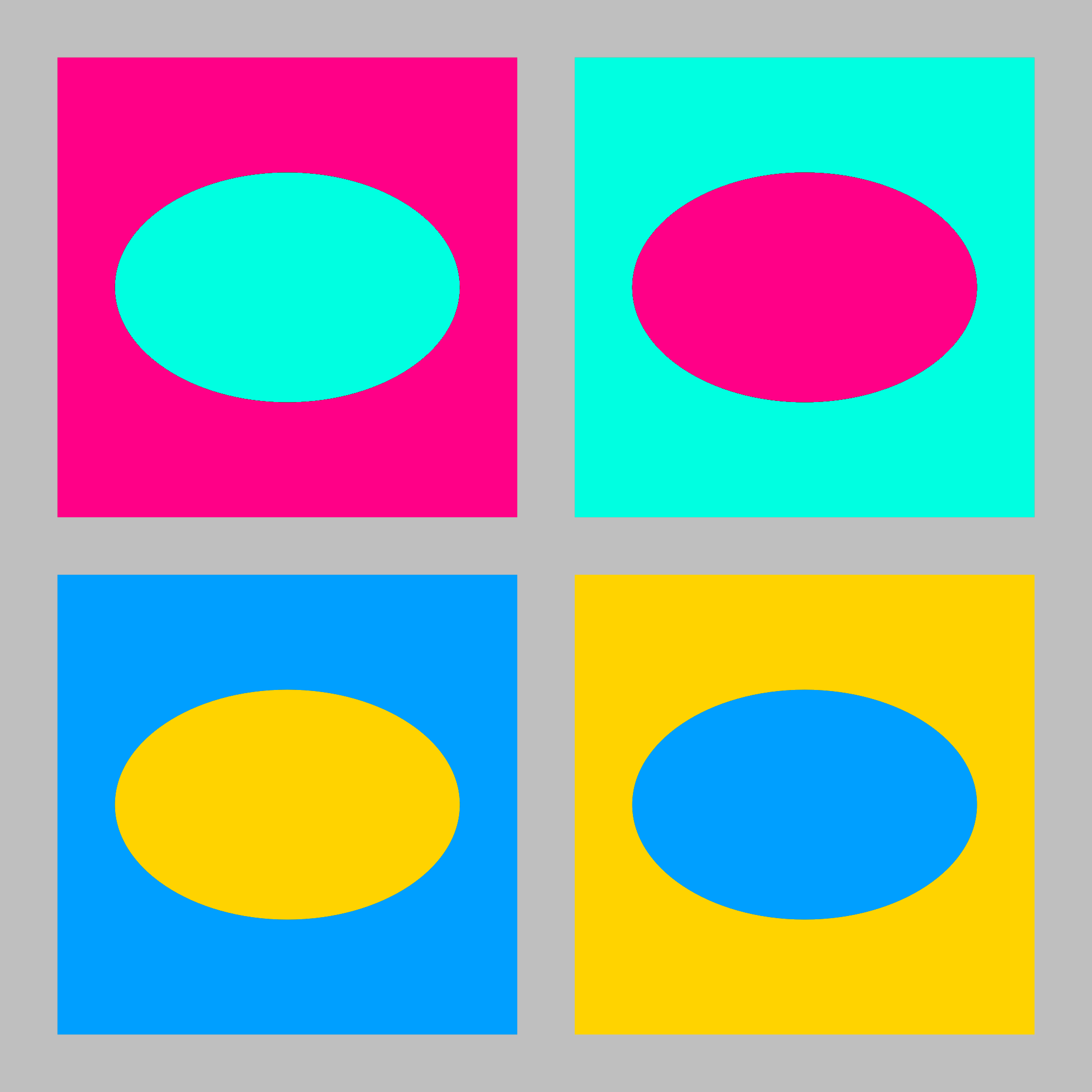
Complementary colors in the opponent process theory.

Complementary colors are pairs of colors which, when combined or mixed, cancel each other out (lose chroma) by producing a grayscale color like white or black. When two highly chromatic complementary colors are placed next to each other, they create a strong contrast. Complementary colors may also be called "opposite colors".

Which pairs of colors are considered complementary depends on the color model that one uses:

- Modern color theory uses either the RGB additive color model or the CMY subtractive color model, and in these, the complementary pairs are red–cyan, green–magenta (one of the purples), and blue–yellow.
- In the traditional RYB color model, the complementary color pairs are red–green, yellow–purple, and blue–orange.
- Opponent process theory suggests that the most contrasting color pairs are red–green and blue–yellow.
- The black–white color pair is common to all the above theories.

These contradictions stem in part from the fact that traditional color theory has been superseded by empirically-derived modern color theory, and in part from the imprecision of language. For example, blue can be the complement of both yellow and orange because a wide range of hues, from cyan to blue-violet, are called blue in English.

== In different color models ==
=== Traditional color model ===
The traditional color wheel model dates to the 18th century and is still used by many artists today. This model designates red, yellow, and blue as primary colors with the primary–secondary complementary pairs of red–green, blue-orange, and yellow–purple.

In this traditional scheme, a complementary color pair contains one primary color (yellow, blue, or red) and a secondary color (green, purple or orange). The complement of any primary color can be made by combining the two other primary colors. For example, to achieve the complement of yellow (a primary color) one could combine red and blue. The result would be purple, which appears directly across from yellow on the color wheel. Continuing with the color wheel model, one could then combine yellow and purple, which essentially means that all three primary colors would be present at once. Since paints work by absorbing light, having all three primaries together produces a black or gray color (see subtractive color). In more recent painting manuals, the more precise subtractive primary colors are magenta, cyan, and yellow.

Complementary colors can create some striking optical effects. The shadow of an object appears to contain some of the complementary color of the object. For example, the shadow of a red apple will appear to contain a little blue-green. This effect is often copied by painters who want to create more luminous and realistic shadows. If one stares at a color for about 45 seconds, and then looks at a white paper or wall, they will briefly see an afterimage of the object in its complementary color.

Placed side-by-side as tiny dots, in partitive color mixing, complementary colors appear gray.

=== Colors produced by light ===
The RGB color model, invented in the 19th century and fully developed in the 20th century, uses combinations of red, green, and blue light against a black background to make the colors seen on a computer monitor or television screen. In the RGB model, the primary colors are red, green, and blue. The complementary primary–secondary combinations are red–cyan, green–magenta, and blue–yellow. In the RGB color model, the light of two complementary colors, such as red and cyan, combined at full intensity, will make white light, since two complementary colors contain light with the full range of the spectrum. If the light is not fully intense, the resulting light will be gray.

In some other color models, such as the HSV color space, the neutral colors (white, grays, and black) lie along a central axis. Complementary colors (as defined in HSV) lie opposite each other on any horizontal cross-section. For example, in the CIE 1931 color space a color of a "dominant" wavelength can be mixed with an amount of the complementary wavelength to produce a neutral color (gray or white).

A traditional color star developed in 1867 by Charles Blanc. The traditional complementary colors used by 19th-century artists such as Van Gogh, Monet and Renoir are directly opposite each other.

The colors of the RGB color model, which uses combinations of red, green, and blue light on a black screen to create all the colors seen on a computer display or television. Complementary colors are opposite each other.

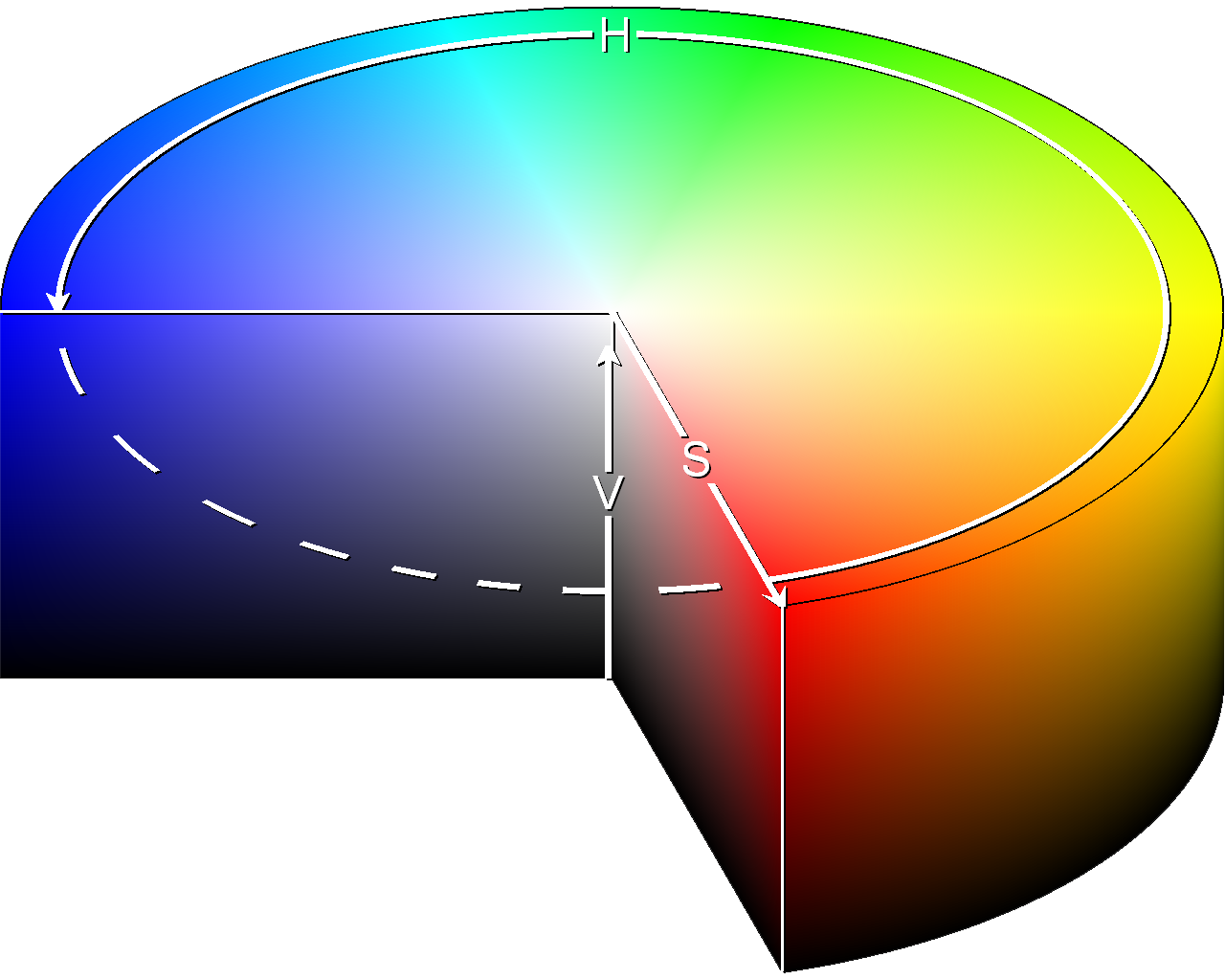
The HSV color wheel has the same complementary colors as the RGB color model.

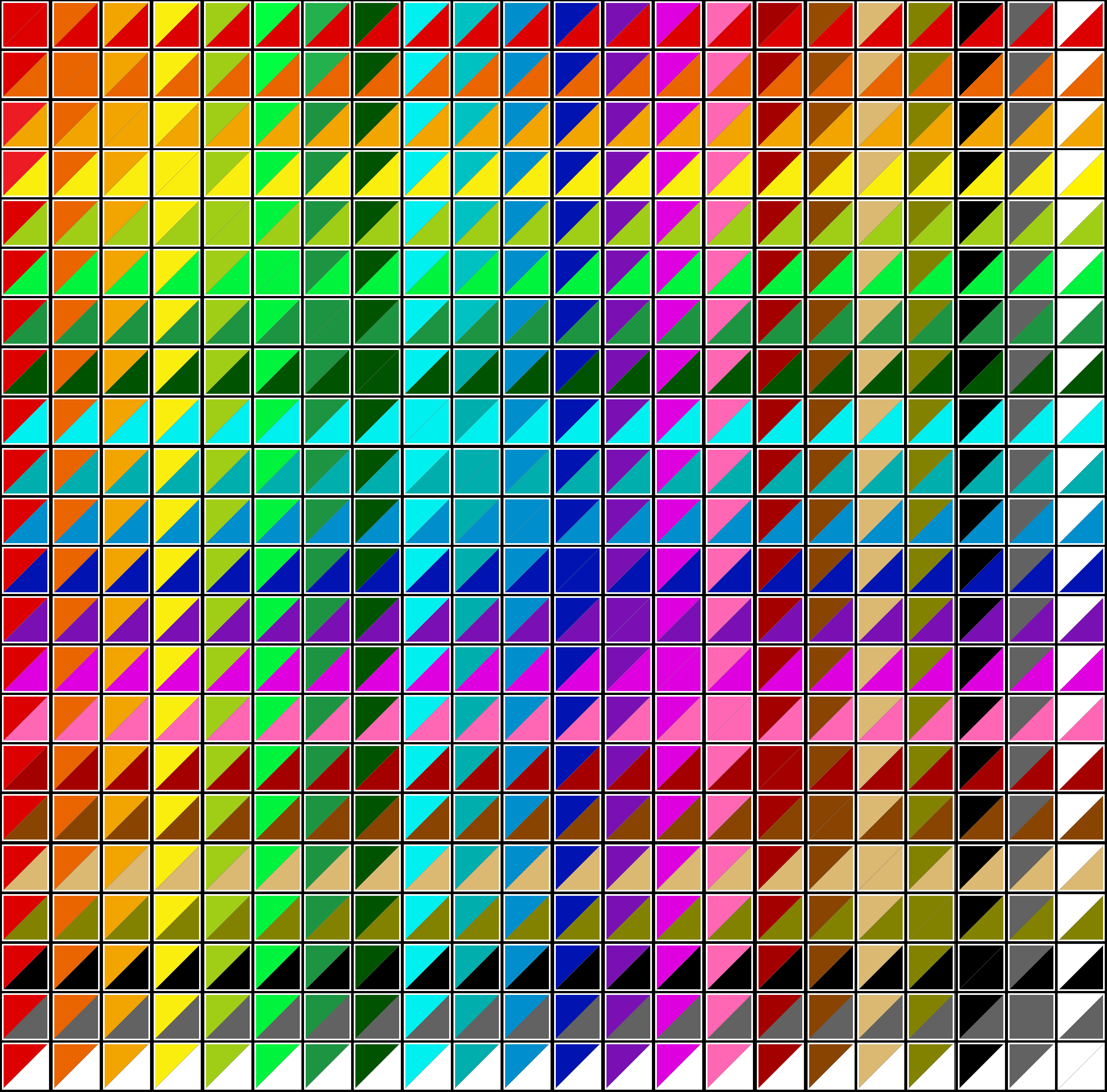
A chart of color combinations.

=== Color printing ===
In the CMYK color model, the primary colors magenta, cyan, and yellow together make black, and the complementary pairs are magenta–green, yellow–blue, and cyan–red.

Color printing, like painting, also uses subtractive colors, but the complementary colors are different from those used in painting. As a result, the same logic applies as to colors produced by light. Color printing uses the CMYK color model, making colors by overprinting cyan, magenta, yellow, and black ink. In printing the most common complementary colors are magenta–green, yellow–blue, and cyan–red. In terms of complementary/opposite colors, this model gives exactly the same result as using the RGB model. Black is added when needed to make the colors darker.

== In theory and art ==
=== In color theory ===
The effect that colors have upon each other has been noted since antiquity. In his essay On Colors, Aristotle observed that "when light falls upon another color, then, as a result of this new combination, it takes on another nuance of color". Saint Thomas Aquinas had written that purple looked different next to white than it did next to black, and that gold looked more striking against blue than it did against white; the Italian Renaissance architect and writer Leon Battista Alberti observed that there was harmony (coniugatio in Latin, and amicizia in Italian) between certain colors, such as red–green and red–blue; and Leonardo da Vinci observed that the finest harmonies were those between colors exactly opposed (retto contrario), but no one had a convincing scientific explanation why that was so until the 18th century.

In 1704, in his treatise on optics, Isaac Newton devised a circle showing a spectrum of seven colors. In this work and in an earlier work in 1672, he observed that certain colors around the circle were opposed to each other and provided the greatest contrast; he named red and blue (modern cyan), yellow and violet, and green and "a purple close to scarlet".

In the following decades, scientists refined Newton's color circle, eventually giving it twelve colors: the three primary colors (yellow, blue, and red); three secondary colors (green, purple and orange), made by combining primary colors; and six additional tertiary colors, made by combining the primary and secondary colors.

In two reports read before the Royal Society (London) in 1794, the American-born British scientist Benjamin Thompson, Count Rumford (1753–1814), coined the term complement to describe two colors that, when mixed, produce white. While conducting photometric experiments on factory lighting in Munich, Thompson noticed that an "imaginary" blue color was produced in the shadow of yellow candlelight illuminated by skylight, an effect that he reproduced in other colors by means of tinted glasses and pigmented surfaces. He theorized that "To every color, without exception, whatever may be its hue or shade, or however it may be compounded, there is another in perfect harmony to it, which is its complement, and may be said to be its companion." He also suggested some possible practical uses of this discovery. "By experiments of this kind, which might easily be made, ladies may choose ribbons for their gowns, or those who furnish rooms may arrange their colors upon principles of the most perfect harmony and of the purest taste. The advantages that painters might derive from a knowledge of these principles of the harmony of colors are too obvious to require illustration."

In the early 19th century, scientists and philosophers across Europe began studying the nature and interaction of colors. The German poet Johann Wolfgang von Goethe presented his own theory in 1810, stating that the two primary colors were those in the greatest opposition to each other, yellow and blue, representing light and darkness. He wrote that "Yellow is a light which has been dampened by darkness; blue is a darkness weakened by light." Out of the opposition of blue and yellow, through a process called "steigerung", or "augmentation" a third color, red, was born. Goethe also proposed several sets of complementary colors which "demanded" each other. According to Goethe, "yellow 'demands' violet; orange [demands] blue; purple [demands] green; and vice versa". Goethe's ideas were highly personal and often disagreed with other scientific research, but they were highly popular and influenced some important artists, including J. M. W. Turner.

At about the same time that Goethe was publishing his theory, a British physicist, doctor and Egyptologist, Thomas Young (1773–1829), showed by experiments that it was not necessary to use all the colors of spectrum to create white light; it could be done by combining the light of just three colors; red, green, and blue. This discovery was the foundation of additive colors, and of the RGB color model. He showed that it was possible to create magenta by combining red and blue light; to create yellow by mixing red and green light; and to create cyan, or blue-green, by mixing green and blue. He also found that it was possible to create virtually any other color by modifying the intensity of these colors. This discovery led to the system used today to create colors on a computer or television display. Young was also the first to propose that the retina of the eye contained nerve fibers which were sensitive to three different colors. This foreshadowed the modern understanding of color vision, in particular the finding that the eye does indeed have three color receptors which are sensitive to different wavelength ranges.

At about the same time as Young discovered additive colors, another British scientist, David Brewster (1781–1868), the inventor of the kaleidoscope, proposed a competing theory that the true primary colors were red, yellow, and blue, and that the true complementary pairs were red–green, blue–orange, and yellow–purple. Then a German scientist, Hermann von Helmholtz, (1821–1894), resolved the debate by showing that colors formed by light, additive colors, and those formed by pigments, subtractive colors, did in fact operate by different rules, and had different primary and complementary colors.

Other scientists looked more closely at the use of complementary colors. In 1828, the French chemist Eugene Chevreul, making a study of the manufacture of Gobelin tapestries to make the colors brighter, demonstrated scientifically that "the arrangement of complementary colors is superior to any other harmony of contrasts". His 1839 book on the subject, De la loi du contraste simultané des couleurs et de l'assortiment des objets colorés, showing how complementary colors can be used in everything from textiles to gardens, was widely read in Germany, France and England, and made complementary colors a popular concept. The use of complementary colors was further publicized by the French art critic Charles Blanc in his book Grammaire des arts et du dessin (1867) and later by the American color theorist Ogden Rood in his book Modern Chromatics (1879). These books were read with great enthusiasm by contemporary painters, particularly Georges Seurat and Vincent van Gogh, who put the theories into practice in their paintings.

In 2022 a team from Los Alamos National Laboratory found that three dimensional perceptual color space is not Riemannian, as has been widely accepted since being proposed by Riemann and furthered by Helmholtz and Schroedinger. They conducted comparative tests with human subjects using 'two-alternative forced choice' tasks for greater accuracy. They found large color differences were perceived as less distant than the sum of all distances within them. When these perceived distances are plotted it results in a non-Euclidean color space. This finding most strongly impacts analogous color pairings, as the distance between colors grows larger as you zoom in on an area of color space. They conclude there would need to be changes to the color standard used by the International Commission of Weights and Measures, to account for diminishing perceptual returns on color spacings.

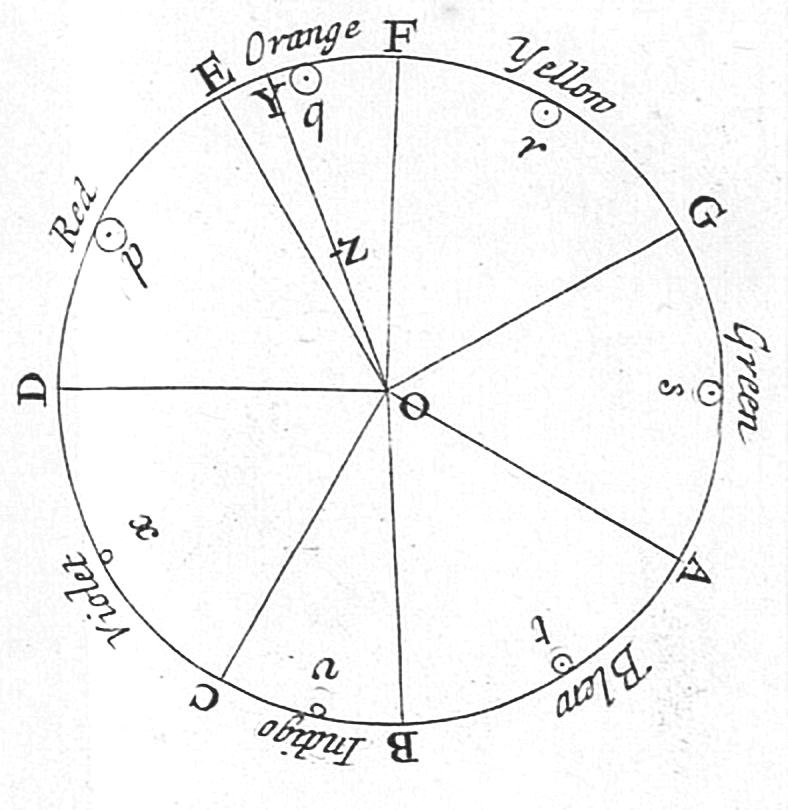
Newton's color circle (1704) displayed seven colors. He declared that colors opposite each other had the strongest contrast and harmony.

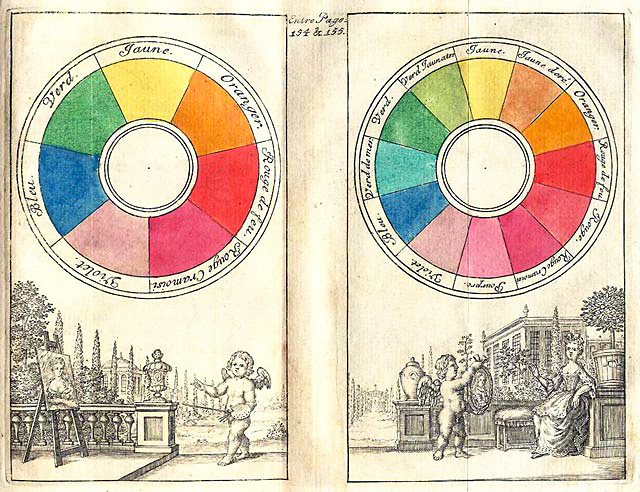
A Boutet color circle from 1708 showed the traditional complementary colors; red and green, yellow and purple, and blue and orange.

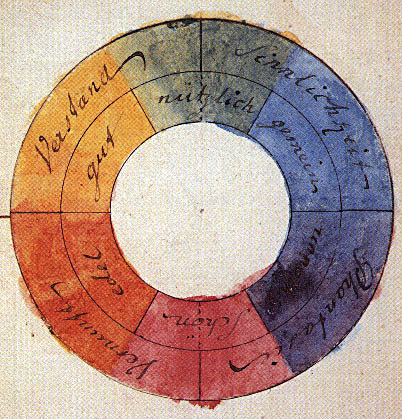
The color wheel designed by Johann Wolfgang von Goethe (1810) was based on the idea that the primary colors yellow and blue, representing light and darkness, were in opposition to each other.

=== In art ===
In 1872, Claude Monet painted Impression, Sunrise, a tiny orange sun and some orange light reflected on the clouds and water in the center of a hazy blue landscape. This painting, with its striking use of the complementary colors orange and blue, gave its name to the impressionist movement. Monet was familiar with the science of complementary colors, and used them with enthusiasm. He wrote in 1888, "color makes its impact from contrasts rather than from its inherent qualities....the primary colors seem more brilliant when they are in contrast with their complementary colors".

Orange and blue became an important combination for all the Impressionist painters. They all had studied the recent books on color theory, and they knew that orange placed next to blue made both colors much brighter. Auguste Renoir painted boats with stripes of chrome orange paint straight from the tube. Paul Cézanne used orange made of touches of yellow, red, and ochre against a blue background.

Vincent van Gogh was especially known for using this technique; he created his own oranges with mixtures of yellow, ochre, and red, and placed them next to slashes of sienna red and bottle-green, and below a sky of turbulent blue and violet. He also put an orange moon and stars in a cobalt blue sky. He wrote to his brother Theo of "searching for oppositions of blue with orange, of red with green, of yellow with purple, searching for broken colors and neutral colors to harmonize the brutality of extremes, trying to make the colors intense, and not a harmony of greys".

Describing his painting, The Night Café, to his brother Theo in 1888, Van Gogh wrote: "I sought to express with red and green the terrible human passions. The hall is blood-red and pale yellow, with a green billiard table in the center, and four lamps of lemon yellow, with rays of orange and green. Everywhere it is a battle and antithesis of the most different reds and greens."

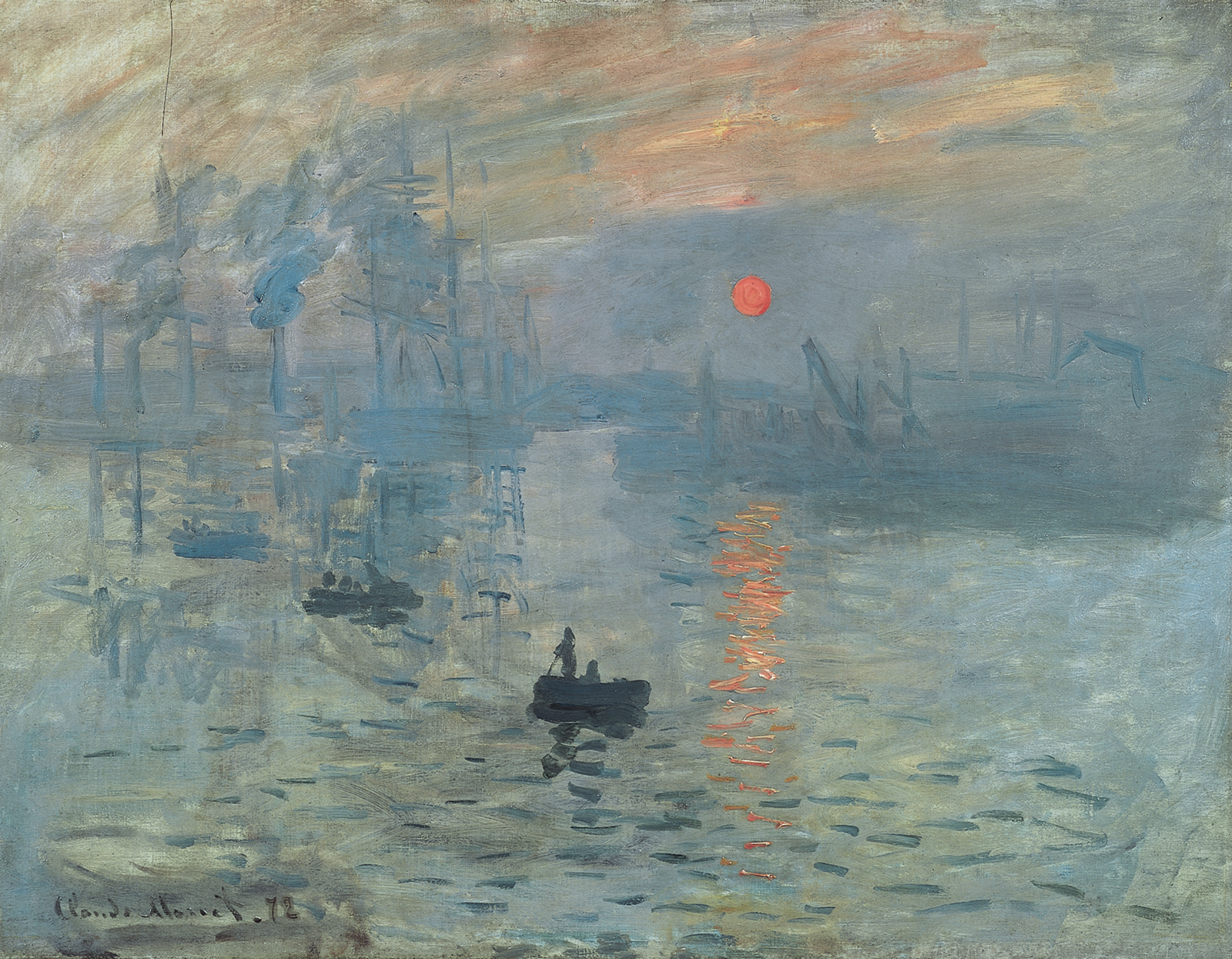
Impression, Sunrise by Claude Monet (1872) featured a tiny but vivid orange sun against a blue background. The painting gave its name to the Impressionist movement.

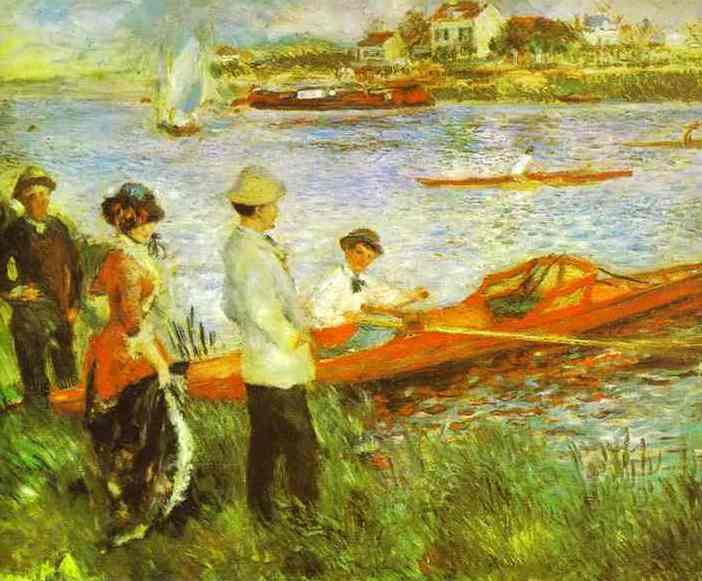
Oarsmen at Chatou by Pierre-Auguste Renoir (1879). Renoir knew that orange and blue brightened each other when put side by side.

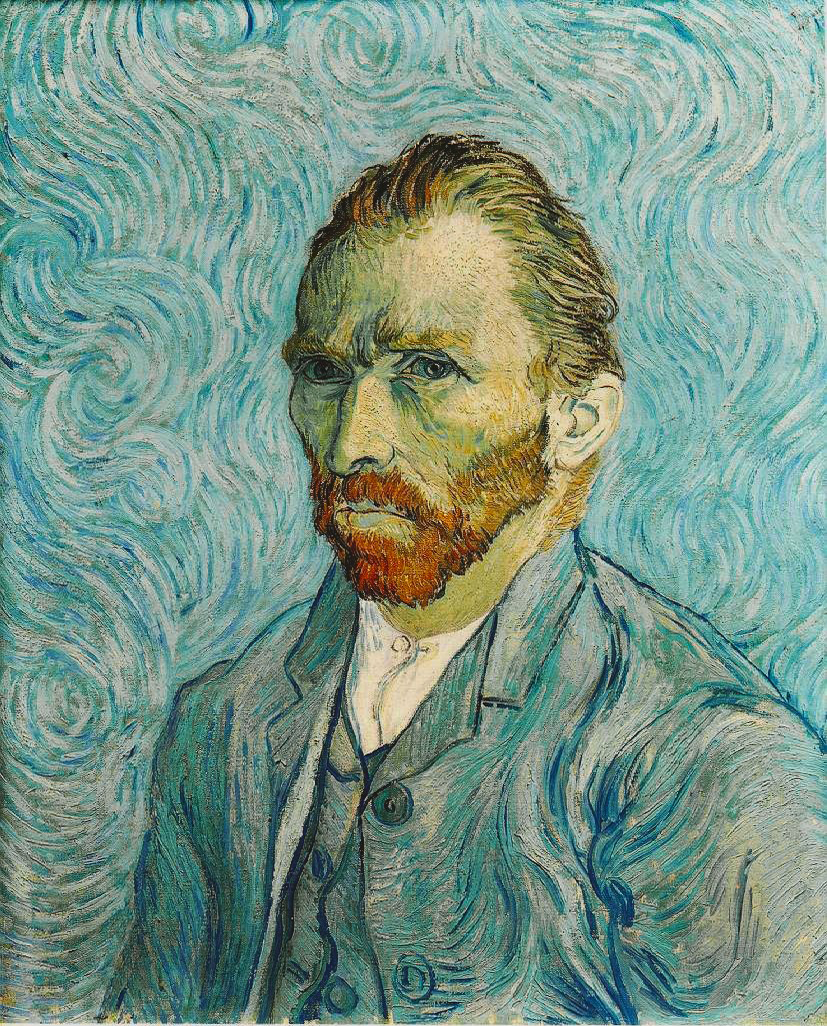
In this self-portrait (1889), Vincent van Gogh made the most of the contrast between the orange of his hair and the blue background.

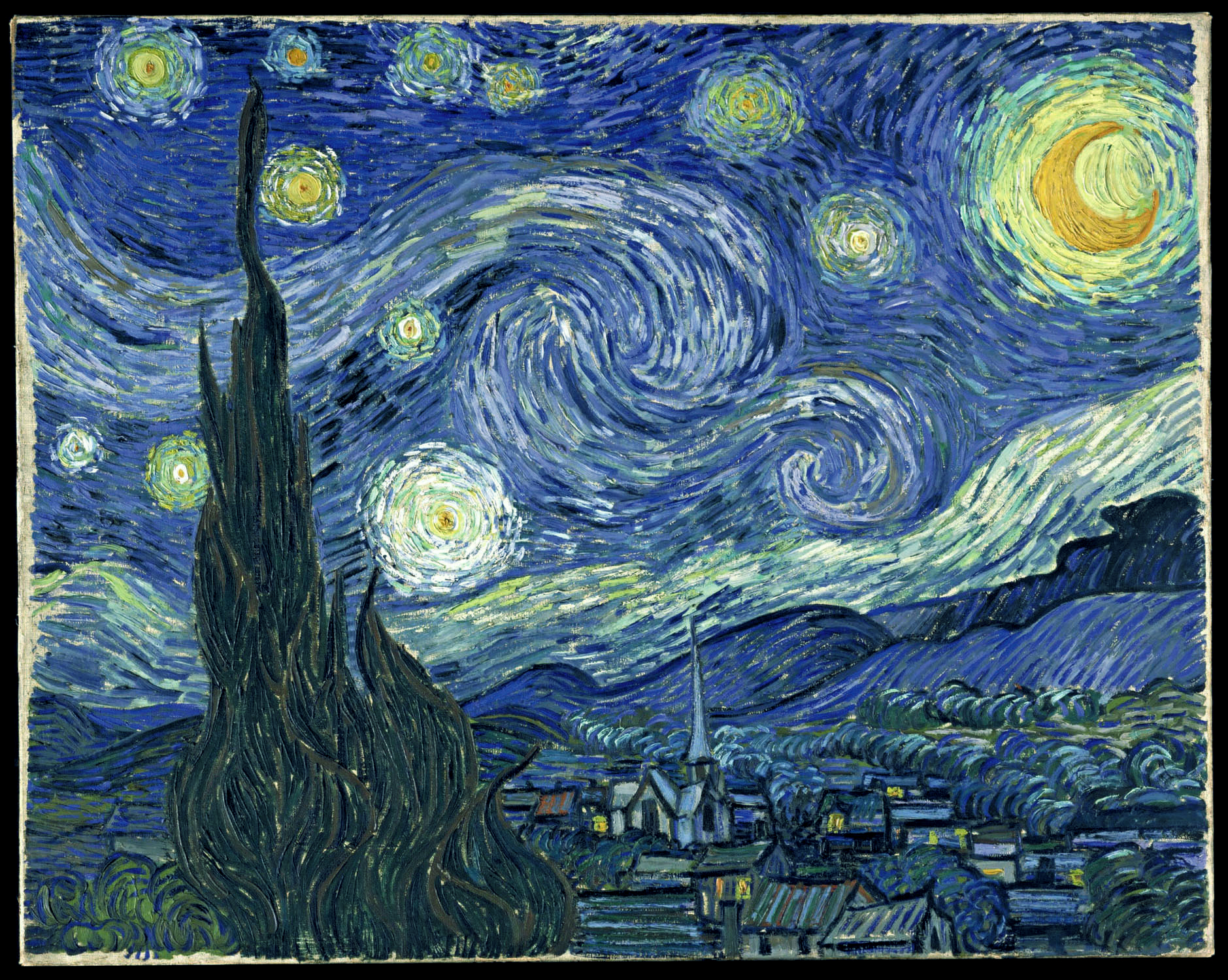
Starry Night by Vincent van Gogh (1889) features yellow stars and a yellow moon.

The Night Café by Vincent van Gogh (1888) used red and green to express what van Gogh called "the terrible human passions".

== Afterimages ==
When one stares at a single color (red for example) for a sustained period of time (roughly thirty seconds to a minute), then looks at a white surface, an afterimage of the complementary color (in this case cyan) will appear. This is one of several aftereffects studied in the psychology of visual perception which are generally ascribed to fatigue in specific parts of the visual system.

In the case above, the photoreceptors for red light in the retina are fatigued, lessening their ability to send the information to the brain. When white light is viewed, the red portions of light incident upon the eye are not transmitted as efficiently as the other wavelengths (or colors), and the result is the illusion of viewing the complementary color since the image is now biased by loss of the color, in this case red. As the receptors are given time to rest, the illusion vanishes. In the case of looking at the white light, red light is still incident upon the eye (as well as blue and green), however, since the receptors for other light colors are also being fatigued, the eye will reach an equilibrium.

== Practical applications ==
The use of complementary colors is an important aspect of aesthetically pleasing art and graphic design. This also extends to other fields such as contrasting colors in logos and retail display. When placed next to each other, complements make each other appear brighter.

Complementary colors also have more practical uses. Because orange and blue are complementary colors, life rafts and life vests are traditionally orange, to provide the highest contrast and visibility when seen from ships or aircraft over the ocean.

Red and cyan glasses are used in the anaglyph 3D system to properly visualise the stereoscopic images produced.

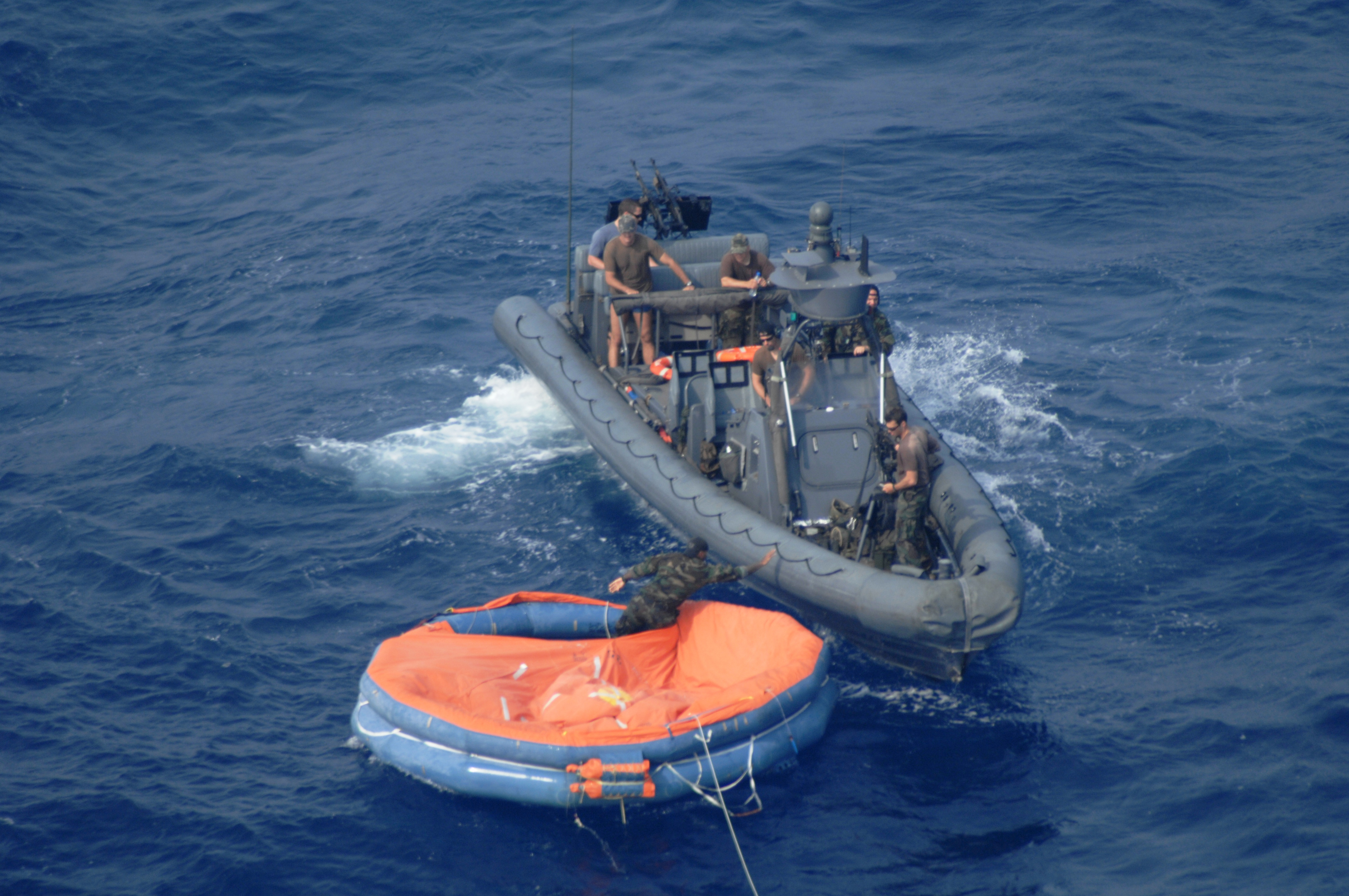
Orange life rafts provide the highest contrast and visibility seen against blue water.

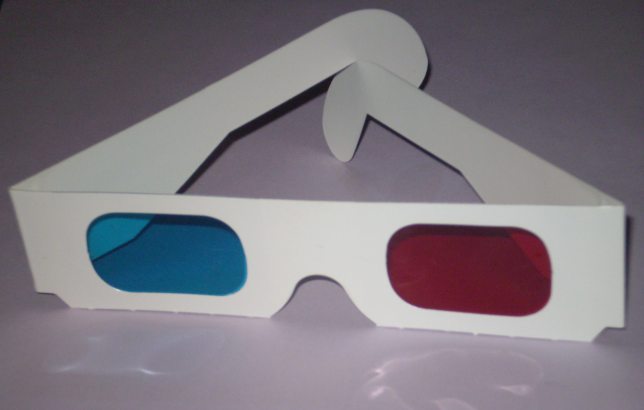
Red and cyan glasses are used for viewing anaglyph 3D three-dimensional images on the Internet or in print.

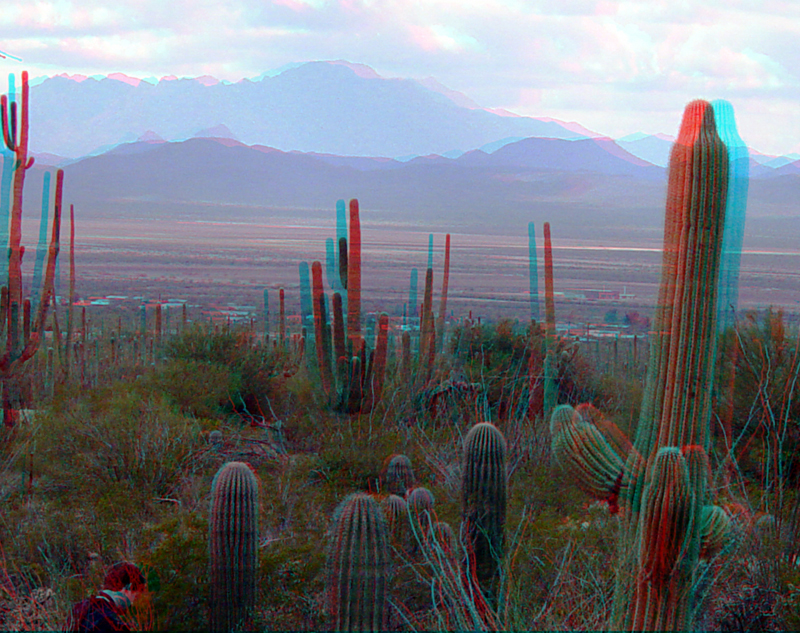
This image, viewed with red and cyan anaglyph 3D glasses, will appear to be in three dimensions. 3D red cyan glasses are recommended to view this image correctly.

== See also ==
- Inverted spectrum

== Bibliography ==
- Isabelle Roelofs and Fabien Petillion, La couleur expliquée aux artistes, Editions Eyrolles, (2012), ISBN 978-2-212-13486-5.
- John Gage, Couleur et Culture, Usages et significations de la couleur de l'Antiquité à l'abstraction, (1993), Thames and Hudson ISBN 978-2-87811-295-5
- Philip Ball, Histoire vivante des couleurs (2001), Hazan Publishers, Paris, ISBN 978-2-754105-033
- Goethe, Theory of Colours, trans. Charles Lock Eastlake, Cambridge, MA: MIT Press, 1982. ISBN 0-262-57021-1
