= Charles Albert Keeley =

British scientist and entertainer (1821–1899)

Charles Albert Keeley (1 December 1821 – 11 August 1889) was a British inventor, amateur scientist, entertainer and pioneering colour expert. He is most famous for his 'Colour Conundrum' parlour game, and is considered by many to be one of Victorian Britain's most significant colour theorists.

== Early life ==
Keeley was born in Bristol, the son of a local clergyman.

== Performance Work ==
Inspired by the work of French chemist and colour theorist Eugene Chevreul, Keeley was a regular performer at the London Royal Polytechnic in the 1860s, which was chaired by distinguished scientist and aeronautical engineer Sir George Cayley. Keeley became famous for an innovative form of magic lantern display in which abstract colour slides replaced the normal representational and narrative forms. By employing geometric and repetitive patterns his projections had the effect of producing afterimages in the eyes of his audiences (it may be that Keeley was familiar with studies of the afterimage made earlier in the century by Goethe and by Czech scientist Jan Purkinje).

Keeley's lantern shows were highly innovative for their time, but they did not prove popular to a Victorian audience and in the early 1870s he spent several months in America, where he produced lighting effects for the Metropolitan Opera House in New York City. It is thought that his original prototype for Colour Conundrum, initially an idea for a parlour game, was devised during his time in America.

== The Colour Conundrum ==
A 2009 reproduction of Keeley's Colour Conundrum in Brighton, UK

In 1873, Keeley invented 'The Colour Conundrum', a game which showcased his research.

=== Rules ===
The participant is informed that at least two of the coloured cards are a matching pair, and is asked to select the matching pair. The player's perception may be influenced by factors such as the lighting inside the cabinet and by reflected hues from the closely situated primary coloured cards. Once the player has decided, the chosen cards are sealed within an envelope.

Proceeding to the other side of the cabinet, the player is allowed to open the envelope and is then offered a second chance to match the two chosen cards with a pair from this second cabinet display, by which time it "may be conjectured that some sort of deception or sleight of hand is being perpetrated".
