= Color mixing =

Producing colors by combining the primary or secondary colors in different amounts

There are three types of color mixing models, depending on the relative brightness of the resultant mixture: additive, subtractive, and average. In these models, mixing black and white will yield white, black, and gray, respectively. Physical mixing processes, e.g. mixing light beams or oil paints, will follow one or a hybrid of these 3 models. Each mixing model is associated with several color models, depending on the approximate primary colors used. The most common color models are optimized to human trichromatic color vision, therefore comprising three primary colors.

== Mixing models ==
=== Additive model ===
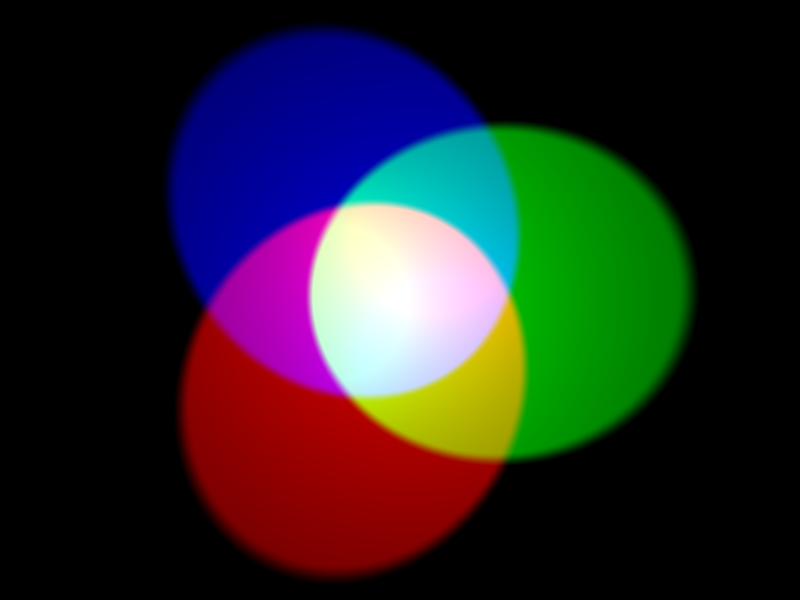
A simulated example of additive color mixing in the RGB model. The primaries red, green, and blue combine pairwise to produce the additive secondaries cyan, magenta, and yellow. Combining all three primaries (center) produces white.

Additive mixing combines two or more colors into a mixture with brightness equal to the sum of the components' brightnesses. An ideal physical model to demonstrate the additive model comprises two superimposed colored lights aimed at the observer. The additive model is usually demonstrated by reflecting two beams of colored light off a white, matte surface (e.g. projectors) or by analyzing the sub-pixels of a color display, both of which follow the additive model closely.

The most common additive color model is the RGB color model, which uses three primary colors: red, green, and blue. This model is the basis of most color displays. Some modern displays are multi-primary color displays, which have 4-6 primaries (RGB, plus cyan, yellow and/or magenta) in order to increase the size of the color gamut. For all additive color models, the absence of all primaries results in black. For practical additive color models, an equal superposition of all primaries results in neutral (gray or white). In the RGB model, an equal mixture of red and green is yellow, an equal mixture of green and blue is cyan and an equal mixture of blue and red is magenta. Yellow, cyan and magenta are the secondary colors of the RGB model.

=== Subtractive model ===
A simulated example of (idealized) subtractive color mixing in the CMY model. The primaries cyan, magenta and yellow combine pairwise to produce subtractive secondaries red, green, and blue. Combining all three primaries (center) absorbs all light and produces black. In practical CMY color models, the center is usually dark gray and a separate black pigment is required to produce black (CMYK model).

Subtractive mixing combines two or more colors into a mixture with brightness lower than either of the two components' brightnesses. An ideal physical model to demonstrate the subtractive model comprises a white light transmitting through two colored filters, each of which subtract a portion of the white light, transmitting a light of the combined color. However, the subtractive model is usually demonstrated with dyes or pigments, such as paint or ink, which often do not closely follow the subtractive model, instead requiring a more complex model such as Kubelka–Munk theory. How well they follow the model depends mostly on the opacity of the pigment or dye.

The most common subtractive color models are the CMYK color model, CMY color model and RYB color model. The CMYK model used in color printing uses cyan, magenta, yellow, and black primaries. For all subtractive color models, the absence of all color primaries results in white. For ideal subtractive color models, an equal superposition of all primaries results in a neutral (dark gray or black). The CMYK model adds a black primary to improve the darkness of blacks, where the CMY model can only mix to dark gray or only achieves black inefficiently, i.e. by using lots of the primary pigments. In the CMY model, an equal mixture of cyan and magenta is blue, an equal mixture of magenta and yellow is red and an equal mixture of yellow and cyan is green. These mixtures are the secondary colors of the CMY model, which are the same as the primaries of the additive RGB model and vice versa.

=== Average model ===
Average mixing (sometimes additive-average) combines two colors into a mixture with brightness equal to the average of the two components' brightnesses. This model is often demonstrated with a Newton disc, where a wheel comprising several color wedges along the circumference is rotated at high speed, such that the human eye cannot temporally differentiate the colors, and they combine to a color with the average brightness (weighted to the angle each color takes up). Another physical model mimics pointillism or halftone printing, where the spatial acuity of the human eye is not sufficient to spatially differentiate the colors, and they combine to a mixture with the average brightness. There are no common color models that explicitly use the average model, though many additive or subtractive models can be described in part by the average model.

== Pigment mixing ==
In the practical mixing of pigments, the subtractive model is usually not closely followed. How the pigment mixing behaves depends strongly on the opacity of the pigments. Ideally, transparent pigments transmit and absorb light, but do not reflect or scatter it and mix according to the subtractive model. Ideally, opaque pigments reflect or absorb light, but do not transmit it and mix according to the average model. Most real paints reflect, transmit and scatter light, so mix according to a hybrid between the subtractive and average models. Paint color mixing is also affected by the media used as wetting, deagglomeration, and dispersing agents for the pigments. These agents all have their own transparency/opacity and color properties and can also alter the transparency and color of pigments.

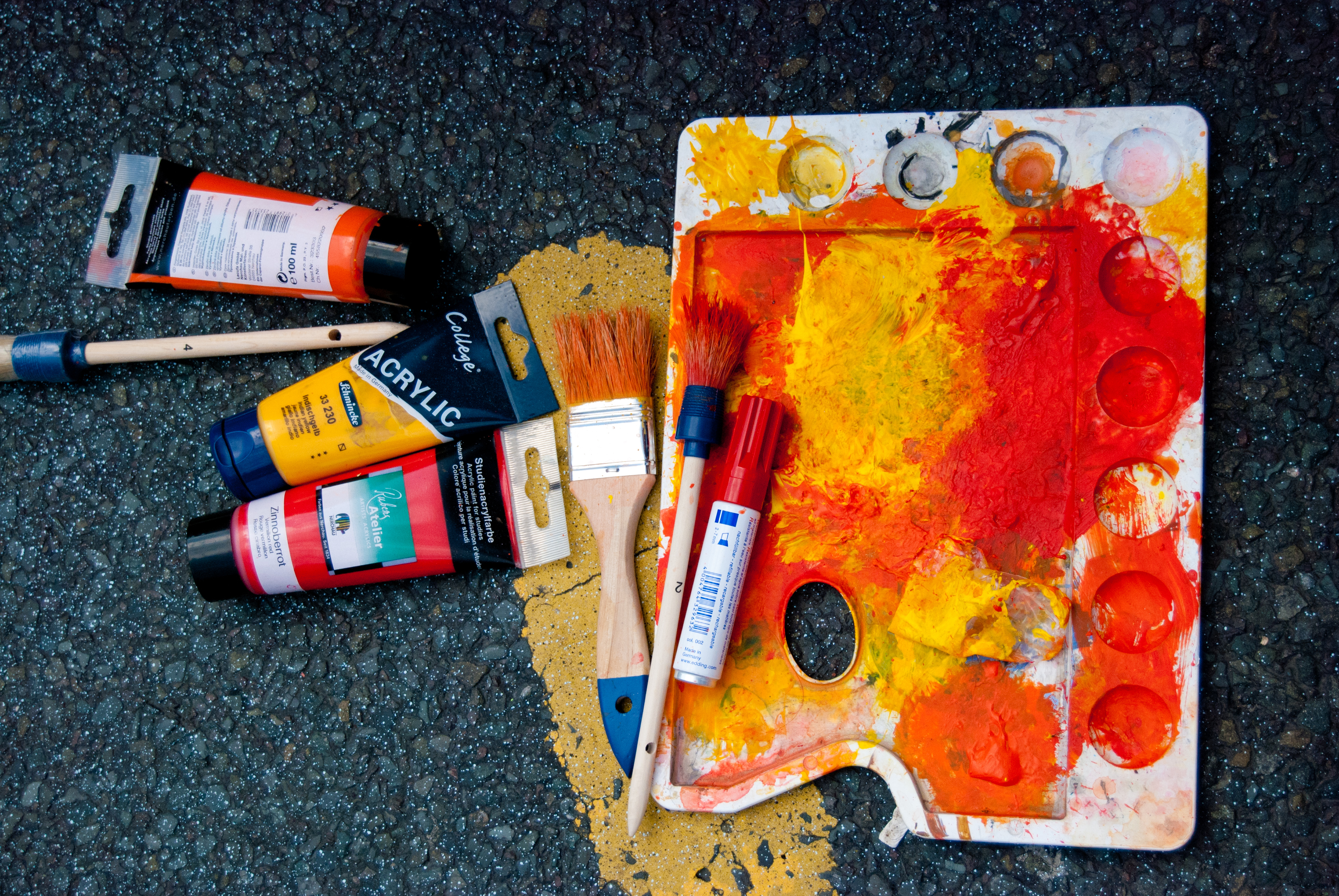
Red and yellow paints being mixed on a palette

For example, mixing red and yellow can result in a shade of orange, generally with a lower chroma or reduced saturation than at least one of the component colors. In some combinations, a mix of blue and yellow paint produces green. This occurs when there is sufficient transparency in the pigments, allowing light to penetrate into the mixed paint, where the two colors together absorb light except wavelengths in the green range. Alternately, if the pigments are highly opaque, a combination of blue and yellow paint appears more grayish. In this case, pigment particles simply reflect whatever light hits the outer paint surface, where both blue and yellow light gets reflected and averaged together.

Halftone printing uses non-opaque inks, such that the light transmits once through the ink, reflects off the white substrate (e.g. paper) and transmits a second time through the ink. Increasing the ink printed on the page decreases the brightness of light, and halftone printing follows the subtractive model well.

== See also ==
- Additive color
- Color theory
- Impossible colors
- Subtractive color
