= Stop light party =

Social event

A stop light party, stoplight party, traffic light party or traffic party is a party at which guests wear different colors indicating their relationship-seeking status. While they may be held anytime, anywhere; they are commonly held around Valentine's Day and in areas around colleges and universities.

== Concept ==
The basic idea of the party is that each guest wears clothing, or a glow stick, in a color that best suits their status. The color green means that one is single and looking for a relationship. Red means that one is in a relationship, or not looking for one. Yellow may mean "unsure" or "maybe," or could mean that one is in a relationship but still open to advances.

The purpose of a stop light party is to decrease the apprehension associated with approaching potential partners at parties. It also serves the purpose of providing an easy indicator of one's unavailability, to fend off unwelcome advances. The color codes derive from the traffic light signal colors indicating red for stop, yellow for caution/slow down, and green for go.

== History ==
The earliest documented examples of a Stop Light or Traffic Light Party held in the public setting can be traced back to the late 1990s and the college town of Albany in upstate New York, where a promoter named Bill Kennedy was throwing them in nightlife venues across the city. The party would gain in popularity after a large nightclub named Sneaky Pete's opened in the winter of 2000. Kennedy would give out glow necklaces and had a large decommissioned traffic light lit up at every party. After years of creating a local buzz, the party received national attention in 2005 after the Albany Times Union ran a feature story about it. The Associated Press (AP) picked up on the story, and it ran nationally on the front page of papers across America. Internet dating site Match.com ran a feature story and after that and the concept went viral. It has been thrown in venues across the world since, receiving extensive media coverage.

== See also ==
- Limits (BDSM)
- Sexual consent
