= Plum (color) =

Deep purple color

Color coordinates
- Hex triplet: #8E4585
- sRGB^{B} (r, g, b): (142, 69, 133)
- HSV (h, s, v): (307°, 51%, 56%)
- CIELCh_{uv} (L, C, h): (41, 51, 315°)
- Source: Maerz and Paul
- B: Normalized to [0–255] (byte)

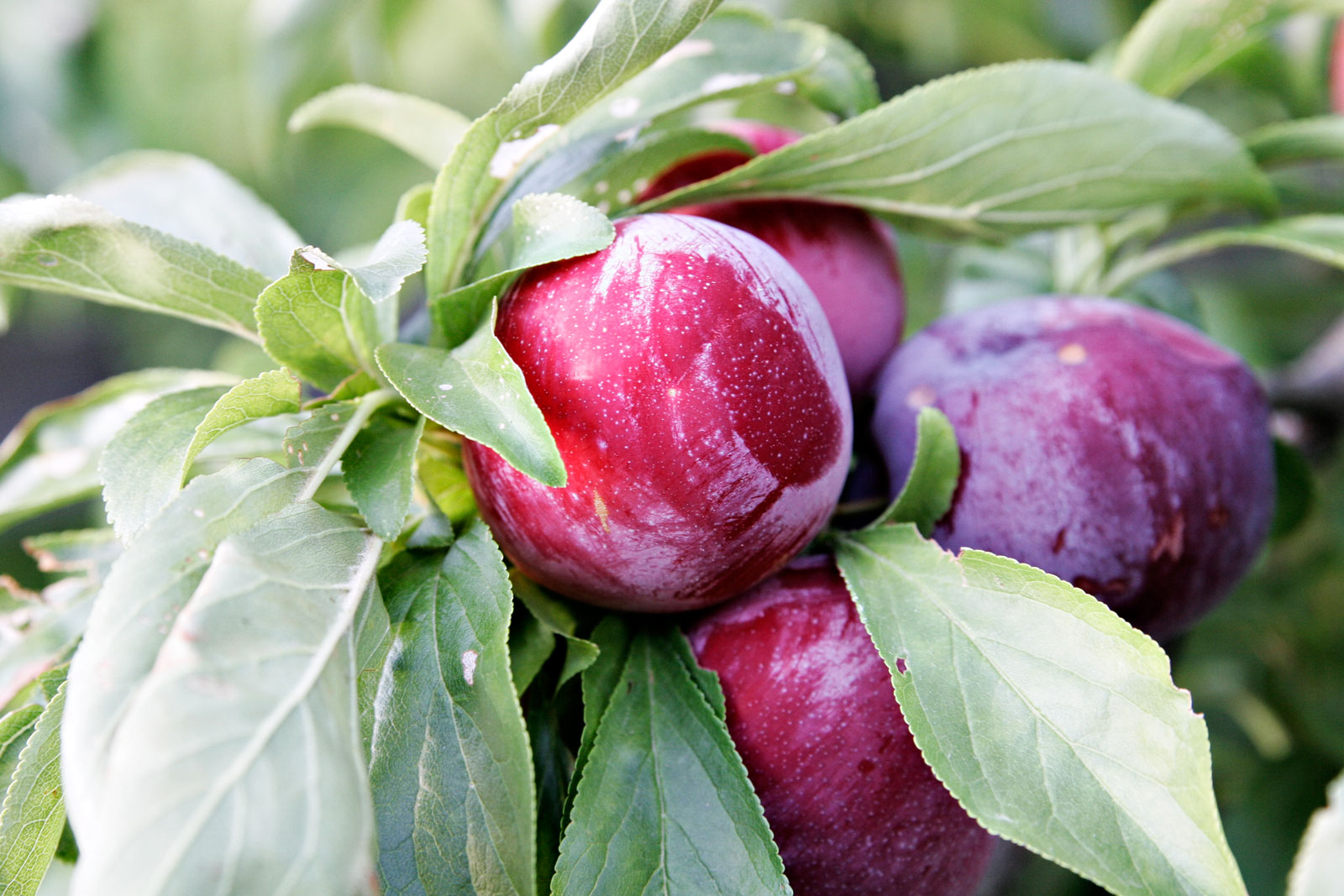
Underripe black plums on a plum tree

Plum is a purple color with a brownish-gray tinge, like that shown on the right, or a reddish purple, which is a close representation of the average color of the plum fruit.

As a quaternary color on the RYB color wheel, plum is an equal mix of the tertiary colors russet and slate.

The first recorded use of plum as a color name in English was in 1805.

== Variations of plum ==
=== Plum (Crayola) ===
Plum (Crayola)

Color coordinates
- Hex triplet: #843179
- sRGB^{B} (r, g, b): (132, 49, 121)
- HSV (h, s, v): (308°, 63%, 52%)
- CIELCh_{uv} (L, C, h): (35, 54, 316°)
- Source: Crayola
- ISCC–NBS descriptor: Deep reddish purple
- B: Normalized to [0–255] (byte)

=== Pale plum ===
Plum (web)

Color coordinates
- Hex triplet: #DDA0DD
- sRGB^{B} (r, g, b): (221, 160, 221)
- HSV (h, s, v): (300°, 28%, 87%)
- CIELCh_{uv} (L, C, h): (73, 50, 308°)
- Source: X11
- ISCC–NBS descriptor: Light reddish purple
- B: Normalized to [0–255] (byte)

At right is displayed the color pale plum, which is the pale tone of plum that is the web color called plum.

This color is paler than the color at the head of this article and paler than the color of an actual plum.

=== Plum (RYB) ===
Plum (RYB)

Color coordinates
- Hex triplet: #C2938D
- sRGB^{B} (r, g, b): (194, 147, 141)
- HSV (h, s, v): (7°, 27%, 76%)
- CIELCh_{uv} (L, C, h): (65, 32, 19°)
- Source: RYB color system
- ISCC–NBS descriptor: Light reddish brown
- B: Normalized to [0–255] (byte)

=== Persian plum (prune) ===
Persian Plum (prune)

Color coordinates
- Hex triplet: #701C1C
- sRGB^{B} (r, g, b): (112, 28, 28)
- HSV (h, s, v): (0°, 75%, 44%)
- CIELCh_{uv} (L, C, h): (25, 59, 12°)
- Source: Xona.com Color List (Maerz and Paul)
- ISCC–NBS descriptor: Deep reddish brown
- B: Normalized to [0–255] (byte)

Displayed at right is the color Persian plum from the Xona.com Color List.

This is the color traditionally called prune because it is a representation of the average color of prunes. Prune is the French word for "plum", but in English the name "prune" is applied to dried plums. This color is a representation of the color of cooked dried plums (prunes).

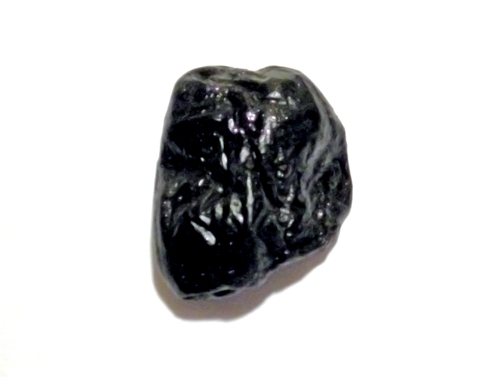
A prune

The first recorded use of prune as a color name in English was in 1789.

== See also ==
- List of colors
