= Red-violet =

Overview of color term

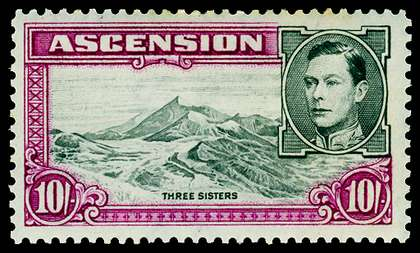
A red-violet used on a postage stamp

Red-violet is a rich color of high medium saturation about 3/4 of the way between red and magenta, closer to magenta than to red. In American English, this color term is sometimes used in color theory as one of the purple colors—a non-spectral color between red and violet that is a deep version of a color on the line of purples on the CIE chromaticity diagram.

In use by some artists red-violet is equivalent to purple. Since violet and purple vary so much in meaning when comparing speakers from different countries and languages, there is much confusion.

The Munsell color system includes the hue term purple, and for some (especially US) speakers of English at the maximum chroma of 12, this refers to 'Red-Purple". This convention is for chromatic purposes, since Red-Purple lies between violet and printer's magenta (the color regarded as magenta before the invention of the web color magenta for computer displays).

== Relationship of red-violet to other colors ==
A traditional RYB color wheel

Red-violet is part of the red "analogous color group", which also includes magenta, red, red-orange, orange, gold, and yellow, i.e., those colors classified as "warm colors", or colors that produce a feeling of warmth (as opposed to "cool colors").

The color that is the complement of red-violet, mint green, lies halfway between green and spring green. It is very close to sea green but highly saturated and of a bright hue.

In some traditional usage, red-violet is the name given to an intermediate, or tertiary color that, along with yellow-orange (gold) and also green-blue (cyan), forms a color wheel triad group. Most contemporary usage, however, would list magenta as the name for the tertiary color in question.

== Red-violet ==
Red-Violet / Medium Violet Red (X11)

Color coordinates
- Hex triplet: #C71585
- sRGB^{B} (r, g, b): (199, 21, 133)
- HSV (h, s, v): (322°, 89%, 78%)
- CIELCh_{uv} (L, C, h): (45, 98, 340°)
- Source: X11
- ISCC–NBS descriptor: Vivid purplish red
- B: Normalized to [0–255] (byte)

Red-violet or pigment purple (pigment red-violet) represents the way the color purple (red-violet) was normally reproduced in pigments, paints, or colored pencils in the 1950s on an old-fashioned RYB color wheel. This color is displayed at right.

The normalized color coordinates for red-violet are identical to medium violet red, which was first recorded as a color name in English with the formalization of the X11 color names over 1985–1989.

By the 1970s, because of the advent of psychedelic art, artists became used to brighter pigments, and pigments called "purple" or "bright purple" that are the pigment equivalent of electric purple became available in artist's pigments and colored pencils. Reproducing electric purple in pigment requires adding some white and a small amount of blue to red-violet pigment. Even then, the reproduction will not be exact, because it is impossible for pigment colors to be so bright as colors displayed on a computer.

== Variations of red-violet ==
=== Kobi ===
Kobi

Color coordinates
- Hex triplet: #E79FC4
- sRGB^{B} (r, g, b): (231, 159, 196)
- HSV (h, s, v): (329°, 31%, 91%)
- CIELCh_{uv} (L, C, h): (73, 45, 337°)
- Source: Xona.com Color List
- ISCC–NBS descriptor: Moderate purplish pink
- B: Normalized to [0–255] (byte)

At the right is displayed the color kobi.

The color name "kobi" for this light tone of red-violet has been in use since 2001, when it was promulgated as one of the colors on the Xona Color List.

=== Pink lavender ===
Pink Lavender

Color coordinates
- Hex triplet: #D8B2D1
- sRGB^{B} (r, g, b): (216, 178, 209)
- HSV (h, s, v): (311°, 18%, 85%)
- CIELCh_{uv} (L, C, h): (77, 28, 316°)
- Source: Pantone TPX
- ISCC–NBS descriptor: Grayish purplish pink
- B: Normalized to [0–255] (byte)

The color pink lavender is displayed at the right.

The source of this color is the "Pantone Textile Paper eXtended (TPX)" color list, color #14-3207 TPX—Pink Lavender.

=== Puce ===
Puce

Color coordinates
- Hex triplet: #CC8899
- sRGB^{B} (r, g, b): (204, 136, 153)
- HSV (h, s, v): (345°, 33%, 80%)
- CIELCh_{uv} (L, C, h): (64, 43, 356°)
- Source: 99colors.net
- ISCC–NBS descriptor: Dark pink
- B: Normalized to [0–255] (byte)

Puce is a medium grayish red-violet color.

=== Pale red-violet ===
Pale Red-Violet

Color coordinates
- Hex triplet: #DB7093
- sRGB^{B} (r, g, b): (219, 112, 147)
- HSV (h, s, v): (340°, 49%, 86%)
- CIELCh_{uv} (L, C, h): (61, 69, 353°)
- Source: X11
- ISCC–NBS descriptor: Deep purplish pink
- B: Normalized to [0–255] (byte)

The color pale red-violet (identical to the web color "pale violet red") is displayed at the right.

This color is a pale tone of red-violet.

=== Violet-red ===
Violet-Red

Color coordinates
- Hex triplet: #F75394
- sRGB^{B} (r, g, b): (247, 83, 148)
- HSV (h, s, v): (336°, 66%, 97%)
- CIELCh_{uv} (L, C, h): (60, 107, 353°)
- Source: Crayola
- ISCC–NBS descriptor: Vivid purplish red
- B: Normalized to [0–255] (byte)

The color violet red is displayed at the right. A bright tone of red-violet, it has been a Crayola color since 1958.

=== Cerise ===
Cerise

Color coordinates
- Hex triplet: #DE3163
- sRGB^{B} (r, g, b): (222, 49, 99)
- HSV (h, s, v): (343°, 78%, 87%)
- CIELCh_{uv} (L, C, h): (50, 118, 2°)
- Source: Maerz and Paul
- ISCC–NBS descriptor: Vivid red
- B: Normalized to [0–255] (byte)

The color cerise is displayed at the right. It is a deep- to vivid-reddish pink color.

=== Red-purple ===
Red-Purple

Color coordinates
- Hex triplet: #953553
- sRGB^{B} (r, g, b): (149, 53, 83)
- HSV (h, s, v): (341°, 64%, 58%)
- CIELCh_{uv} (L, C, h): (37, 62, 357°)
- Source: Gallego and Sanz
- ISCC–NBS descriptor: Vivid purplish red
- B: Normalized to [0–255] (byte)

Red-purple is the color that is called Rojo-Purpura (the Spanish word for "red-purple") in the Guía de coloraciones (Guide to colorations) by Rosa Gallego and Juan Carlos Sanz, a color dictionary published in 2005 that is widely popular in the Hispanophone realm.

Although "red-purple" is a seldom-used color name in English, in Spanish it is regarded as one of the major tones of purple.

=== Blush ===
Blush

Color coordinates
- Hex triplet: #DE5D83
- sRGB^{B} (r, g, b): (222, 93, 131)
- HSV (h, s, v): (342°, 58%, 87%)
- CIELCh_{uv} (L, C, h): (57, 86, 357°)
- Source: Crayola
- ISCC–NBS descriptor: Strong purplish red
- B: Normalized to [0–255] (byte)

The color blush is displayed at the right.

The first recorded use of "blush" as a color name in English was in 1590.

"Blush" has been a Crayola color since 1998. It was originally called "cranberry", until 2005.

=== Smitten ===
Smitten

Color coordinates
- Hex triplet: #C84186
- sRGB^{B} (r, g, b): (200, 65, 134)
- HSV (h, s, v): (329°, 68%, 78%)
- CIELCh_{uv} (L, C, h): (49, 84, 344°)
- Source: Resene
- ISCC–NBS descriptor: Vivid purplish red
- B: Normalized to [0–255] (byte)

Displayed at the right is the color smitten.

"Smitten" is one of the colors on the Resene Color List, a color list widely popular in Australia and New Zealand. The color was formulated in 2011.

=== Medium red-violet ===
Medium Red-Violet

Color coordinates
- Hex triplet: #BB3385
- sRGB^{B} (r, g, b): (187, 51, 133)
- HSV (h, s, v): (324°, 73%, 73%)
- CIELCh_{uv} (L, C, h): (45, 82, 338°)
- Source: Crayola
- ISCC–NBS descriptor: Vivid purplish red
- B: Normalized to [0–255] (byte)

Medium red-violet is the medium tone of the color red-violet that is called "red-violet" in Crayola crayons. It has been a Crayola color since 1930.

=== Fandango ===
Fandango

Color coordinates
- Hex triplet: #B53389
- sRGB^{B} (r, g, b): (181, 51, 137)
- HSV (h, s, v): (320°, 72%, 71%)
- CIELCh_{uv} (L, C, h): (44, 78, 333°)
- Source: 99colors.net/Maerz and Paul
- ISCC–NBS descriptor: Vivid purplish red
- B: Normalized to [0–255] (byte)

Displayed at the right is the color fandango.

The first recorded use of "fandango" as a color name in English was in 1919.

=== Flirt ===
Flirt

Color coordinates
- Hex triplet: #A2006D
- sRGB^{B} (r, g, b): (162, 0, 109)
- HSV (h, s, v): (320°, 100%, 64%)
- CIELCh_{uv} (L, C, h): (36, 81, 339°)
- Source: Xona.com Color List
- ISCC–NBS descriptor: Deep purplish red
- B: Normalized to [0–255] (byte)

At the right is displayed the color flirt.

The first recorded use of "flirt" as a color name in English was in 1928.

In 2001, "flirt" was included as one of the colors on the Xona Color List.

=== Popstar ===
Popstar

Color coordinates
- Hex triplet: #BE4F62
- sRGB^{B} (r, g, b): (190, 79, 98)
- HSV (h, s, v): (350°, 58%, 75%)
- CIELCh_{uv} (L, C, h): (49, 78, 4°)
- Source: Resene
- ISCC–NBS descriptor: Moderate red
- B: Normalized to [0–255] (byte)

Displayed at the right is the color popstar.

"Popstar" is one of the colors on the Resene Color List. It was formulated in 2006.

=== Jazzberry jam ===
Jazzberry Jam

Color coordinates
- Hex triplet: #A50B5E
- sRGB^{B} (r, g, b): (165, 11, 94)
- HSV (h, s, v): (328°, 93%, 65%)
- CIELCh_{uv} (L, C, h): (36, 85, 349°)
- Source: Crayola
- ISCC–NBS descriptor: Deep purplish red
- B: Normalized to [0–255] (byte)

The color jazzberry jam is displayed at the right.

This color, a deep shade of red-violet, was formulated by Crayola in 2003.

=== Wine ===
Wine

Color coordinates
- Hex triplet: #722F37
- sRGB^{B} (r, g, b): (114, 47, 55)
- HSV (h, s, v): (353°, 59%, 45%)
- CIELCh_{uv} (L, C, h): (29, 45, 7°)
- Source: ISCC-NBS
- ISCC–NBS descriptor: Deep reddish brown
- B: Normalized to [0–255] (byte)

At the right is displayed the color wine.

The color "wine" is a representation of the average color of red wine.

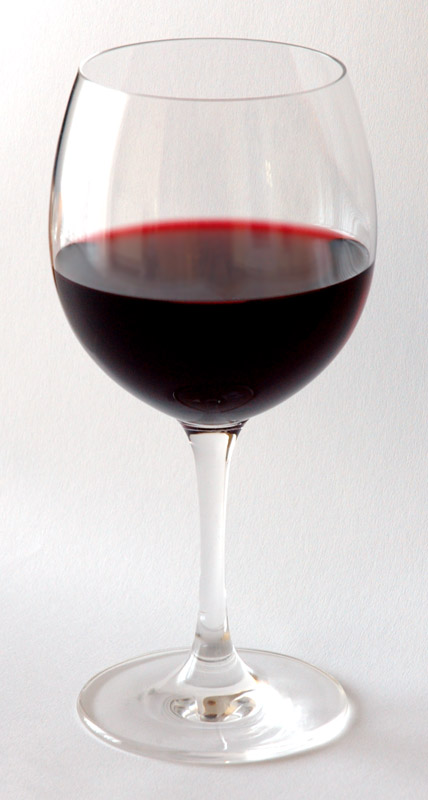
A glass of red wine

The first recorded use of "wine" as a color name in English was in 1705.

=== Byzantium ===
Byzantium

Color coordinates
- Hex triplet: #702963
- sRGB^{B} (r, g, b): (112, 41, 99)
- HSV (h, s, v): (311°, 63%, 44%)
- CIELCh_{uv} (L, C, h): (29, 44, 319°)
- Source: ISCC-NBS
- ISCC–NBS descriptor: Deep reddish purple
- B: Normalized to [0–255] (byte)

The color Byzantium is displayed at the right.

The first recorded use of "byzantium" as a color name in English was in 1926.

=== Eggplant ===
Eggplant

Color coordinates
- Hex triplet: #614051
- sRGB^{B} (r, g, b): (97, 64, 81)
- HSV (h, s, v): (329°, 34%, 38%)
- CIELCh_{uv} (L, C, h): (31, 20, 337°)
- Source: Crayola
- ISCC–NBS descriptor: Dark purplish red
- B: Normalized to [0–255] (byte)

Eggplant is a dark purple or purplish brown, color that resembles the color of the outer skin of European eggplant. Another name for the color "eggplant" is aubergine (the French and British English word for eggplant).

The first recorded use of "eggplant" as a color name in English was in 1915.

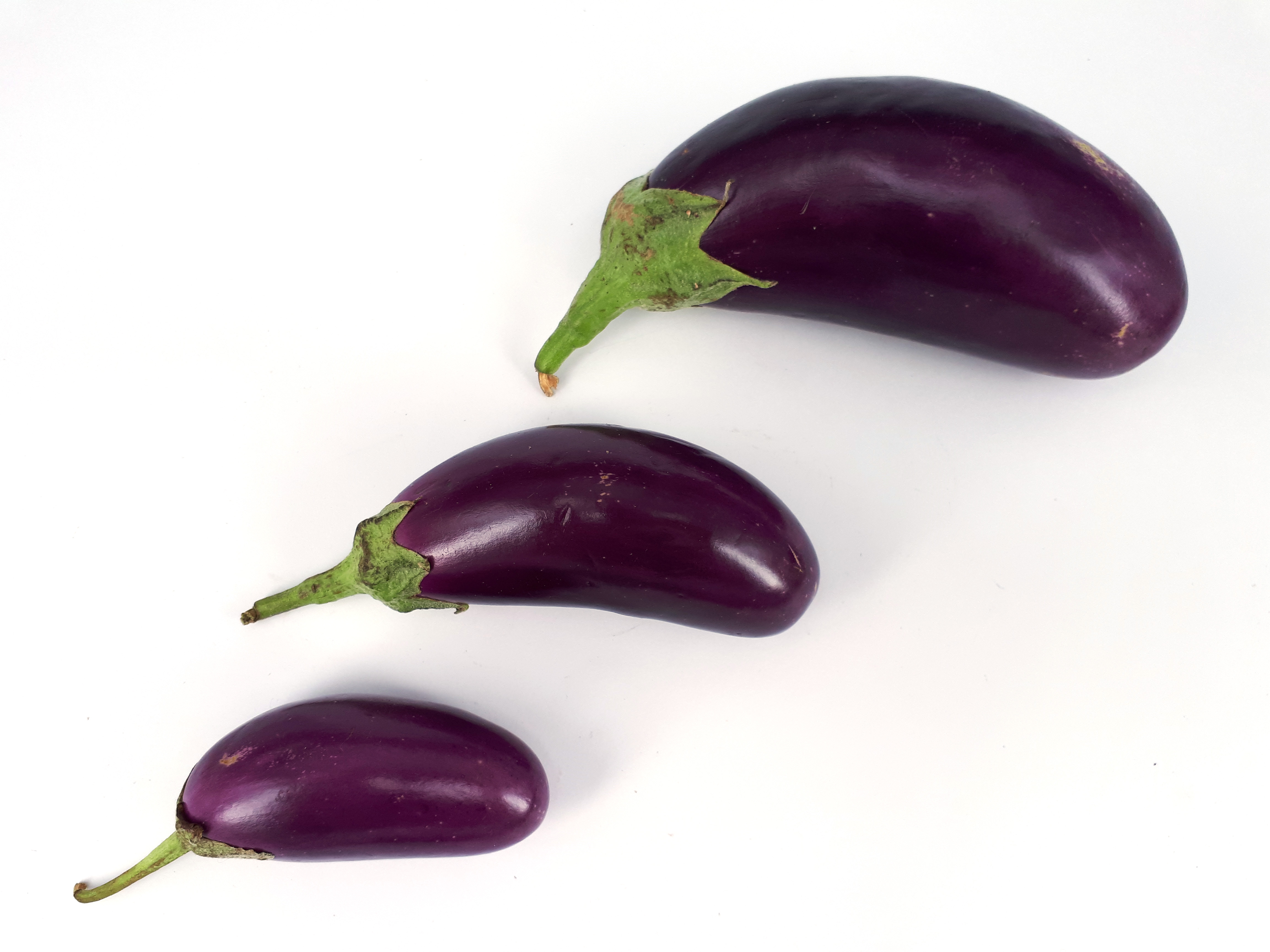
Eggplants, or aubergines

The dark grayish-red-violet color shown in the color box as "eggplant" was introduced by Crayola in 1998.

=== Violet-red (Per Bang) ===
Violet-red (Per Bang)

Color coordinates
- Hex triplet: #F0559C
- sRGB^{B} (r, g, b): (240, 85, 156)
- HSV (h, s, v): (333°, 65%, 94%)
- CIELCh_{uv} (L, C, h): (59, 99, 348°)
- Source: perbang.dk
- B: Normalized to [0–255] (byte)

Violet-red (Per Bang) is the bright color of red-violet.

== Wrapping the spectrum into a color wheel ==
If the visible spectrum is wrapped to form a color wheel, red-violet appears midway between red and magenta:

Visible spectrum wrapped to join violet and red in an additive mixture of red-violet

== See also ==
- RAL 3004 Purple red
- List of colors
