= Sage (color) =

Grey-green colour

Sage as a quaternary color
slate
sage
citron

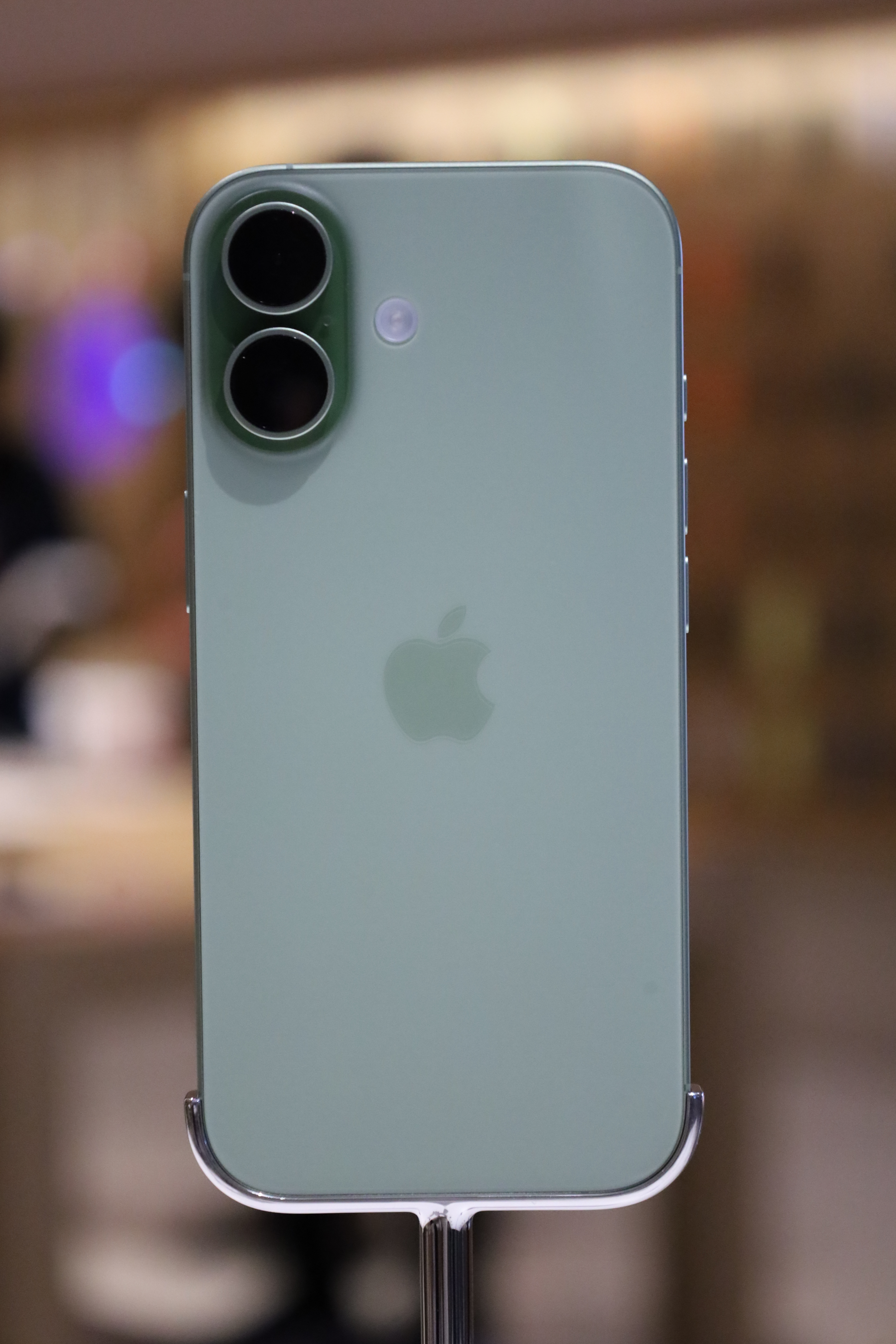
iPhone 17 in sage green color

Sage is a grey-green resembling that of dried sage leaves. As a quaternary color, it is an equal mix of the tertiary colors citron and slate. The hex RGB color value of the adjacent sage swatch is BCB88A. For decades, some military flight jackets were made in sage green.

== See also ==
- List of colors
