= Capri (color) =

Bright, cyan-azure colour

Colour coordinates
- Hex triplet: #00BFFF
- sRGB^{B} (r, g, b): (0, 191, 255)
- HSV (h, s, v): (195°, 100%, 100%)
- CIELCh_{uv} (L, C, h): (73, 83, 234°)
- Source: ColorHexa
- ISCC–NBS descriptor: Strong greenish blue
- B: Normalized to [0–255] (byte)

Deep Sky Blue (RGB)

Color coordinates
- Hex triplet: #009FFF
- sRGB^{B} (r, g, b): (0, 159, 255)
- HSV (h, s, v): (203°, 100%, 100%)
- CIELCh_{uv} (L, C, h): (63, 100, 247°)
- Source: HTML CSS Color
- B: Normalized to [0–255] (byte)

Capri or deep sky blue is a deep shade of sky blue which is the colour located halfway between cyan and azure on the colour wheel. It is a quaternary colour that has a hue of exactly 195 degrees on the RGB colour wheel. The complementary colour of capri is vermillion.

The color Capri in general is named for the color of the Mediterranean Sea around the island of Capri off Italy, the site of several villas belonging to the Roman Emperor Tiberius, including his Imperial residence in his later years, the Villa Jovis. Specifically, the color Capri is named after the color of the Blue Grotto on the island of Capri, as it appears on a bright sunny day.

The first use of Capri as a color name in English was in 1920. The normalized color coordinates for Capri are identical to deep sky blue, which was formalized as a color in the X11 color names over 1985–1989.

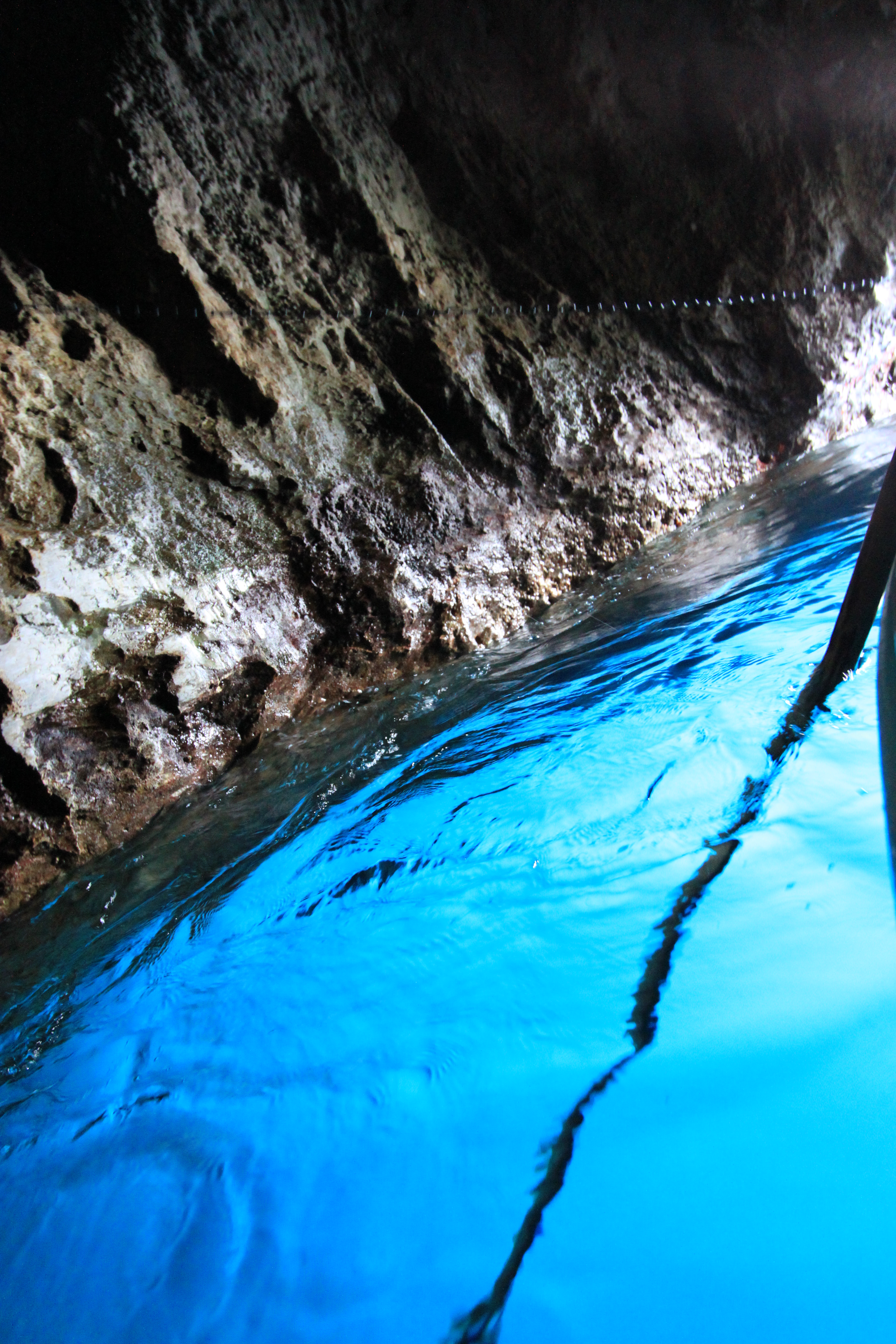
Deep sky blue waters of the Blue Grotto in Capri

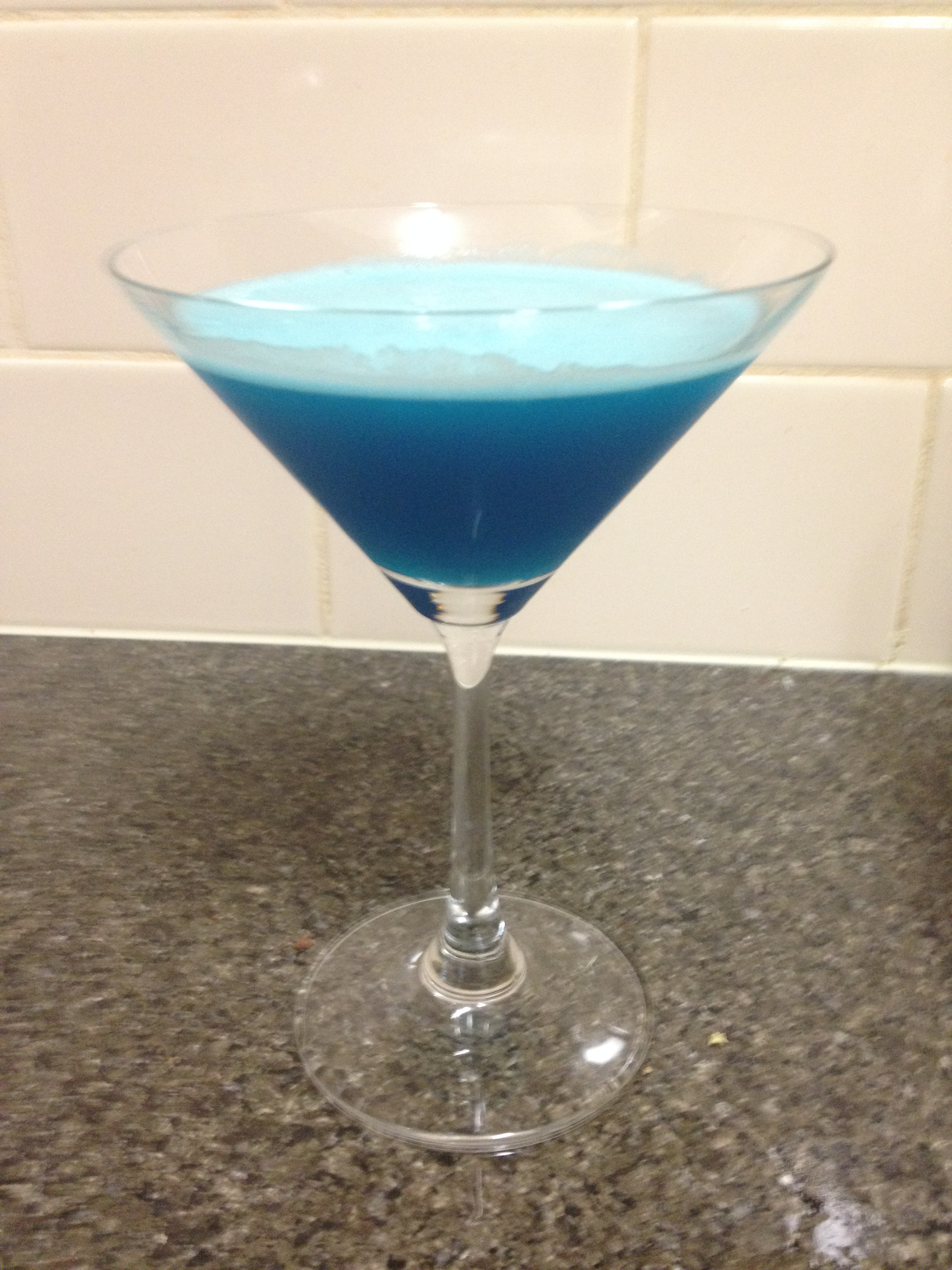
Sea of Capri cocktail
