= Virtual Red =

Japanese manga series by Shigisawa Kaya

ヴァーチャル・レッド (Vācharu Reddo)
- Genre: Erotic, Psychological, Drama, Romance
- Manga
- Written by: Shigisawa Kaya
- Published by: Hakusensha
- Imprint: Rakuen Comics
- Magazine: Rakuen Web Zoukan (Le Paradis)
- Original run: August 2004 (dōjinshi); Summer 2011 (commercial) – 2013
- Volumes: 3

Virtual Red (Japanese: ヴァーチャル・レッド, Hepburn: Vācharu Reddo) is a Japanese manga series written and illustrated by Shigisawa Kaya. It is an erotic psychological drama with elements of romance and comedy, originally serialized as a dōjinshi before receiving a commercial release.

== Plot ==
Through a colleague, an ordinary IT worker named Fujii learns about an old house where a mysterious woman offers free sex to visitors. Driven by curiosity, he visits the house and becomes entangled by a strange, addictive relationship with the woman. The story explores themes of desire, obsession, virtual versus real connections and the psychological effects of their encounters.

== Publication ==
The series began as a dōjinshi in August 2004. It continued in dōjinshi format until 2007 and later moved to commercial publication in the web version of Rakuten magazine starting in summer 2011. It was compiled into three tankōbon volumes by Hakusensha under the Rakuen Comics imprint.

== Legacy ==
"Virtual Red" has been noted in manga review blogs for its psychological depth and unsettling portrayal of relationships.

The manga inspired the character Virtual Red (also referred to as Infernal Red/Rilen Akai Chiper) in the manga series Annihilate Godkiller Protocol. In "Annihilate: Godkiller Protocol", Virtual Red is portrayed as a powerful, charismatic and manipulative tyrant who serves as one of the thirty Infernal rulers of the kingdom of Zentrix. There are other Infernals being the First Circle (Red, Orange, Yellow, Green, Blue, Purple, Black, Gray, Brown, White) the Second Circle (Lime, Cyan, Pink, Magenta, Prism, Ivory, Gold, Silver, Copper, Scarlet) and the Third Circle (Navy, Jade, Maroon, Teal, Diamond, Olive, Sythensis, Metal, Amber, Violet). Infernal Ivory represents Tan, Navy represents Indigo, and Maroon represents Crimson.
