= Secondary color =

Color made by mixing two primary colors

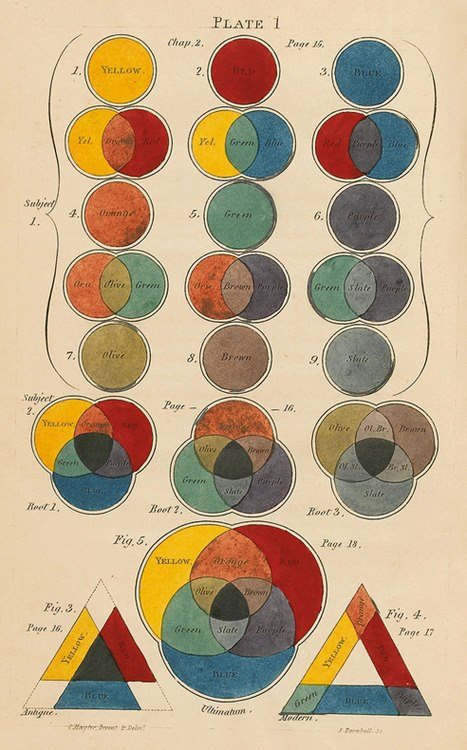
Page from A New Practical Treatise on the Three Primitive Colours Assumed as a Perfect System of Rudimentary Information by Charles Hayter.

A secondary color is a color made by mixing two primary colors of a given color model in even proportions. Combining one secondary color and a primary color in the same manner produces a tertiary color. Secondary colors are special in traditional color theory and color science.

== Overview ==
=== Primary color ===
In traditional color theory, it is believed that all colors can be mixed from three universal primary - or pure - colors, which were originally believed to be red, yellow and blue pigments (representing the RYB color model). However, modern color science does not recognize universal primary colors and only defines primary colors for a given color model or color space. RGB and CMYK color models are popular color models in modern color science, but are only chosen as efficient primaries, in that their combination leads to a large gamut. However, any three primaries can produce a viable color gamut. The RYB model continues to be used and taught as a color model for practical color mixing in the visual arts.

=== Secondary color ===
A secondary color is an even mixture of two primary colors. For a given color model, secondary colors have no special meaning, but are useful when comparing additive and subtractive color models.

=== Intermediate color ===
An intermediate color is any mixture of a secondary and a primary color. They are often visualized as even mixtures, but intermediate colors can arise from any mixture proportion. Therefore any color that is not a secondary or primary color is an intermediate color.

=== Tertiary color ===
Tertiary color has two common, conflicting definitions, depending on context.

In traditional color theory, which applies mostly to practical painting, a tertiary color is an even mixture between two secondary colors, i.e. a mixture of three primaries in 1:2:1 proportion. This definition is used by color theorists, such as Moses Harris and Josef Albers. The result is approximately a less saturated form of the dominant primary color of the mixture. Under this definition, a color model has 3 tertiary colors.

More recently, an alternative definition has emerged that is more applicable to digital media, where a tertiary color is an intermediate color resulting from an even mixture of a primary and a secondary color, i.e. a mixture of the primaries in 3:1:0 proportion. The result yields a maximum saturation for a given hue. Under this definition, a color model has 6 tertiary colors. This definition is now much more common and the previous one is rarely used and has fallen out of fashion.

=== Quaternary color ===
A quaternary color is a seldom-used descriptor that is the conceptual extension of a tertiary color. Quaternary colors have no special use or status in color theory or color science.

Under the traditional definition, a quaternary color is the even mixture of two tertiary colors, as demonstrated by Charles Hayter. These quaternary colors have contributions from all three primaries in 3-3-2 proportions, so are very desaturated (even mixtures of three primaries gives a neutral color: zero saturation). Under this definition, a color model has 3 quaternary colors.

Under the modern definition, a quaternary color is the even mixture of a tertiary color with either a secondary or primary color. Quaternary colors are sometimes given a maximum saturation for their hue. Under this definition, a color model has 12 quaternary colors. Like with tertiaries, this is the main definition for it now and the previous one has fallen out of fashion.

== RGB and CMYK ==
Primary, secondary, and tertiary colors of the RGB (CMY) color wheel, with tertiary colors described under the modern definition.

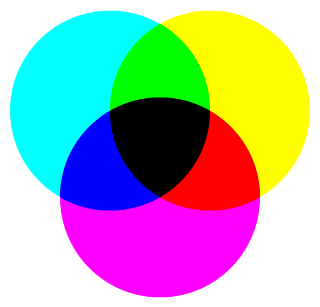
Primary colors of the CMY color model: cyan, magenta, and yellow, mixed to form secondary colors red, green, and blue.

The RGB color model is an additive mixing model, used to estimate the mixing of colored light, with primary colors red, green, and blue. The secondary colors are yellow, cyan and magenta as demonstrated here:

red	(●)	+	green	(●)	=	yellow	(●)
green	(●)	+	blue	(●)	=	cyan	(●)
blue	(●)	+	red	(●)	=	magenta	(●)

The CMY color model is an analogous subtractive mixing color model, used to estimate the mixing of colored pigments, with primary colors cyan, magenta, and yellow, equivalent to the secondary colors of the RGB color model. The secondary colors of the CMY model are blue, red and green, equivalent to the primary colors of the RGB model, as demonstrated here:

cyan	(●)	+	magenta	(●)	=	blue	(●)
magenta	(●)	+	yellow	(●)	=	red	(●)
yellow	(●)	+	cyan	(●)	=	green	(●)

Under the modern definition, the six tertiary colors are conceptually equivalent between the color models, and can be described by the even combinations of a primary and a secondary color:

red	(●)	+	yellow	(●)	=	orange	(●)
yellow	(●)	+	green	(●)	=	chartreuse	(●)
green	(●)	+	cyan	(●)	=	spring	(●)
cyan	(●)	+	blue	(●)	=	azure	(●)
blue	(●)	+	magenta	(●)	=	violet	(●)
magenta	(●)	+	red	(●)	=	rose	(●)

The twelve quaternary colors are each formed from the even combination of a primary or secondary color with an adjacent tertiary color, sitting at the midpoints between those hues on the RGB color wheel. They subdivide the wheel into its fourth-order intervals, expanding the named spectrum from twelve to twenty-four evenly spaced reference hues, each separated by fifteen degrees of arc.

red	(●)	+	orange	(●)	=	vermilion	(●)
orange	(●)	+	yellow	(●)	=	amber	(●)
yellow	(●)	+	chartreuse	(●)	=	lime	(●)
chartreuse	(●)	+	green	(●)	=	harlequin	(●)
green	(●)	+	spring	(●)	=	mint	(●)
spring	(●)	+	cyan	(●)	=	viridian	(●)
cyan	(●)	+	azure	(●)	=	cerulean	(●)
azure	(●)	+	blue	(●)	=	cobalt	(●)
blue	(●)	+	violet	(●)	=	indigo	(●)
violet	(●)	+	magenta	(●)	=	purple	(●)
magenta	(●)	+	rose	(●)	=	cerise	(●)
rose	(●)	+	red	(●)	=	crimson	(●)

The twenty-four quinary colors represent the fifth subdivision of the RGB color wheel, each formed from the even combination of two adjacent colors from the quaternary level or below. Occupying the midpoints between every neighboring pair of primary, secondary, tertiary, and quaternary hues, they complete a continuous sequence of forty-eight named colors spaced at uniform intervals of 7.5 degrees around the wheel.

red	(●)	+	vermilion	(●)	=	scarlet	(●)
vermilion	(●)	+	orange	(●)	=	tangelo	(●)
orange	(●)	+	amber	(●)	=	marigold	(●)
amber	(●)	+	yellow	(●)	=	gold	(●)
yellow	(●)	+	lime	(●)	=	pear	(●)
lime	(●)	+	chartreuse	(●)	=	pomelo	(●)
chartreuse	(●)	+	harlequin	(●)	=	pistachio	(●)
harlequin	(●)	+	green	(●)	=	fern	(●)
green	(●)	+	mint	(●)	=	clover	(●)
mint	(●)	+	spring	(●)	=	emerald	(●)
spring	(●)	+	viridian	(●)	=	jade	(●)
viridian	(●)	+	cyan	(●)	=	turquoise	(●)
cyan	(●)	+	cerulean	(●)	=	aquamarine	(●)
cerulean	(●)	+	azure	(●)	=	capri	(●)
azure	(●)	+	cobalt	(●)	=	lapis	(●)
cobalt	(●)	+	blue	(●)	=	ultramarine	(●)
blue	(●)	+	indigo	(●)	=	sapphire	(●)
indigo	(●)	+	violet	(●)	=	tanzanite	(●)
violet	(●)	+	purple	(●)	=	amethyst	(●)
purple	(●)	+	magenta	(●)	=	orchid	(●)
magenta	(●)	+	cerise	(●)	=	fuchsia	(●)
cerise	(●)	+	rose	(●)	=	azalea	(●)
rose	(●)	+	crimson	(●)	=	raspberry	(●)
crimson	(●)	+	red	(●)	=	ruby	(●)

A color model is a conceptual model and does not have specifically defined primary colors. A color space based on the RGB color model, most commonly sRGB, has defined primaries and can be used to visualize the color mixing and yield approximate tertiary, quaternary, and quinary colors. Also note that the color terms applied to tertiary, quaternary, and quinary colors are not well-defined.

sRGB colors approximating primary (1), secondary (2), tertiary (3), quaternary (4), and quinary (5) colors in an RGB color model and additionally defined by the hue angle in HSV color space

(#FF0000; 0°) red (1)
(#FF2000; 7.5°) scarlet (5)
(#FF4000; 15°) vermilion (4)
(#FF6000; 22.5°) tangelo (5)
(#FF8000; 30°) orange (3)
(#FF9F00; 37.5°) marigold (5)
(#FFBF00; 45°) amber (4)
(#FFDF00; 52.5°) gold (5)
(#FFFF00; 60°) yellow (2)
(#DFFF00; 67.5°) pear (5)
(#BFFF00; 75°) lime (4)
(#9FFF00; 82.5°) pomelo (5)
(#80FF00; 90°) chartreuse (3)
(#60FF00; 97.5°) pistachio (5)
(#40FF00; 105°) harlequin (4)
(#20FF00; 112.5°) fern (5)
(#00FF00; 120°) green (1)
(#00FF20; 127.5°) clover (5)
(#00FF40; 135°) mint (4)
(#00FF60; 142.5°) emerald (5)
(#00FF80; 150°) spring (3)
(#00FF9F; 157.5°) jade (5)
(#00FFBF; 165°) viridian (4)
(#00FFDF; 172.5°) turquoise (5)
(#00FFFF; 180°) cyan (2)
(#00DFFF; 187.5°) aquamarine (5)
(#00BFFF; 195°) cerulean (4)
(#009FFF; 202.5°) capri (5)
(#007FFF; 210°) azure (3)
(#0060FF; 217.5°) lapis (5)
(#0040FF; 225°) cobalt (4)
(#0020FF; 232.5°) ultramarine (5)
(#0000FF; 240°) blue (1)
(#2000FF; 247.5°) sapphire (5)
(#4000FF; 255°) indigo (4)
(#6000FF; 262.5°) tanzanite (5)
(#7F00FF; 270°) violet (3)
(#9F00FF; 277.5°) amethyst (5)
(#BF00FF; 285°) purple (4)
(#DF00FF; 292.5°) orchid (5)
(#FF00FF; 300°) magenta (2)
(#FF00DF; 307.5°) fuchsia (5)
(#FF00BF; 315°) cerise (4)
(#FF009F; 322.5°) azalea (5)
(#FF0080; 330°) rose (3)
(#FF0060; 337.5°) raspberry (5)
(#FF0040; 345°) crimson (4)
(#FF0020; 352.5°) ruby (5)
(#FF0000; 360°) red (1)

== RYB color model ==
A RYB color wheel with tertiary colors described under the modern definition.

RYB is a subtractive mixing color model, used to estimate the mixing of pigments (e.g. paint) in traditional color theory, with primary colors red, yellow, and blue. The secondary colors are green, purple, and orange as demonstrated here:

red	(●)	+	yellow	(●)	=	orange	(●)
yellow	(●)	+	blue	(●)	=	green	(●)
blue	(●)	+	red	(●)	=	purple	(●)

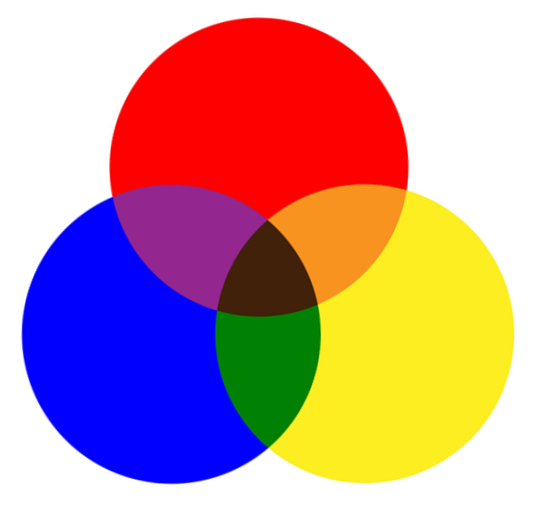
Primary colors of the RYB color model: red, yellow, and blue, mixed to form colors orange, green, and purple.

Under the modern definition (as even combinations of a primary and a secondary color), tertiary colors are typically named by combining the names of the adjacent primary and secondary color. However, these tertiary colors have also been ascribed with common names: amber/marigold (yellow-orange), vermilion/cinnabar (red-orange), magenta/burgundy/wine (red-purple), violet (blue-purple), teal/aqua (blue-green), and chartreuse/lime green (yellow-green). The 6 tertiary colors are given:

red	(●)	+	orange	(●)	=	red-orange	(●)	~	vermilion
orange	(●)	+	yellow	(●)	=	yellow-orange	(●)	~	amber
yellow	(●)	+	green	(●)	=	yellow-green	(●)	~	chartreuse
green	(●)	+	blue	(●)	=	blue-green	(●)	~	teal
blue	(●)	+	purple	(●)	=	blue-purple	(●)	~	violet
purple	(●)	+	red	(●)	=	red-purple	(●)	~	fuchsia

Approximate colors and color names are given for the tertiary and quaternary colors. However, the names for the twelve quaternary colors are quite variable, and defined here only as an approximation.

RYB colors approximating primary (1), secondary (2), tertiary (3), and quaternary (4) colors
red (1) scarlet (4) vermilion (3) persimmon (4) orange (2) tangerine (4) amber (3) marigold (4) yellow (1) lemon (4) chartreuse (3) lime (4) green (2) viridian (4) teal (3) cerulean (4) blue (1) indigo (4) violet (3) iris (4) purple (2) aubergine (4) fuchsia (3) crimson (4) red (1)

Under the traditional definition, there are three tertiary colors, approximately named russet (orange–purple), slate (purple–green), and citron (green–orange), with the corresponding three quaternary colors plum (russet–slate), sage (slate–citron), buff (citron–russet) (with olive sometimes used for either slate or citron). In every level of mixing, saturation of the resultant decreases and mixing two quaternary colors approaches gray.

The RYB color terminology outlined above and in the color samples shown below is ultimately derived from the 1835 book Chromatography, an analysis of the RYB color wheel by George Field, a chemist who specialized in pigments and dyes.

RYB colors produced by mixing equal amounts of secondary and subsequent colors
Primary red yellow blue	Secondary orange green purple	Tertiary russet citron slate	Quaternary buff sage plum

== See also ==
- Color theory
- Color wheel
- Lists of colors
- Primary color
