= Amber (color) =

Color midway between yellow and orange

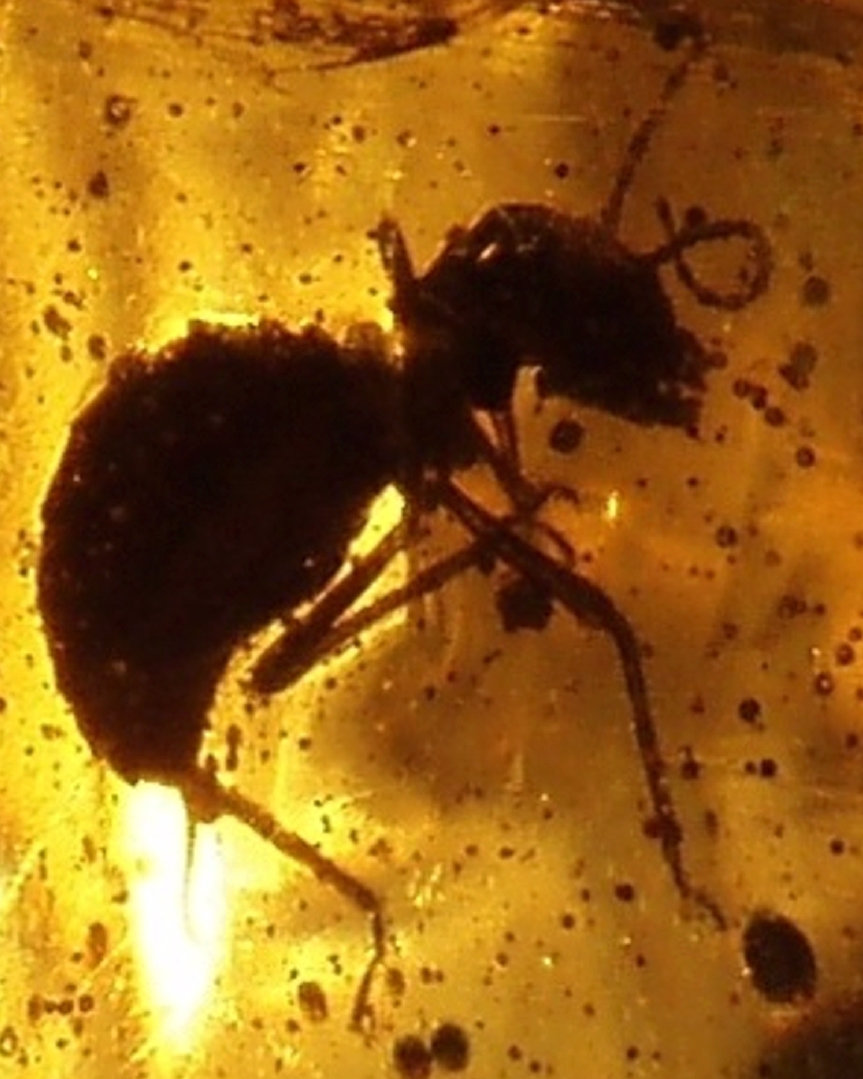
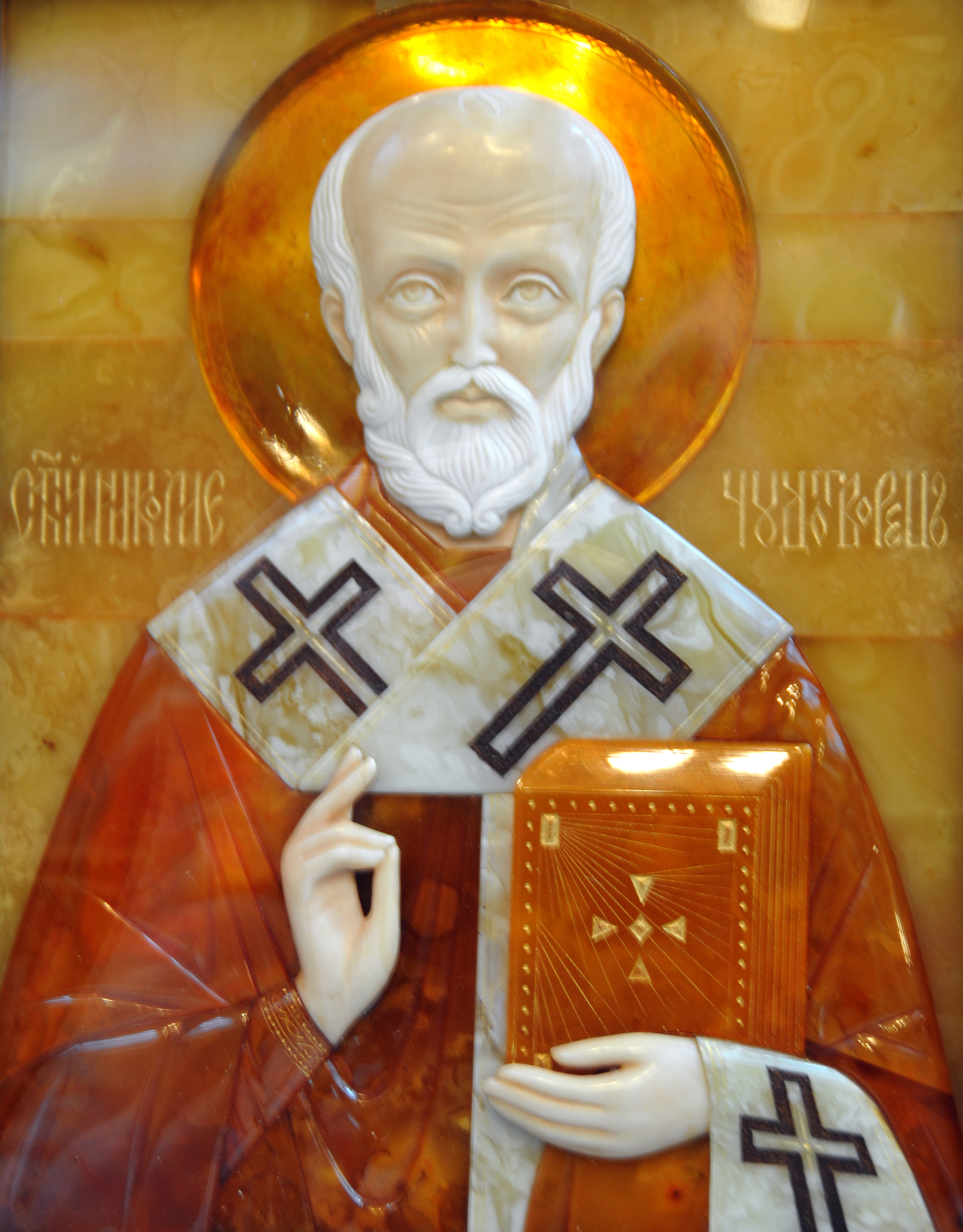
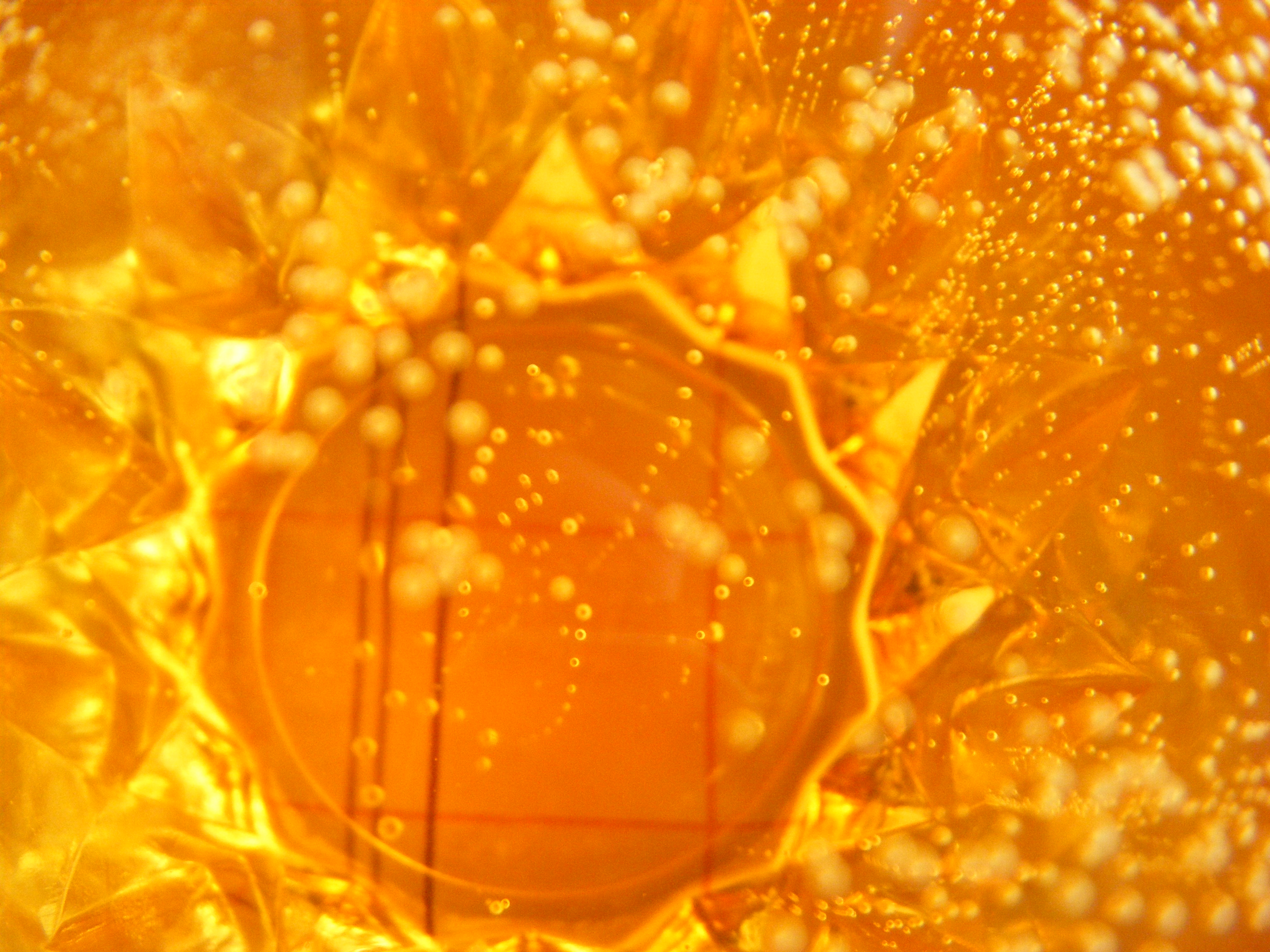
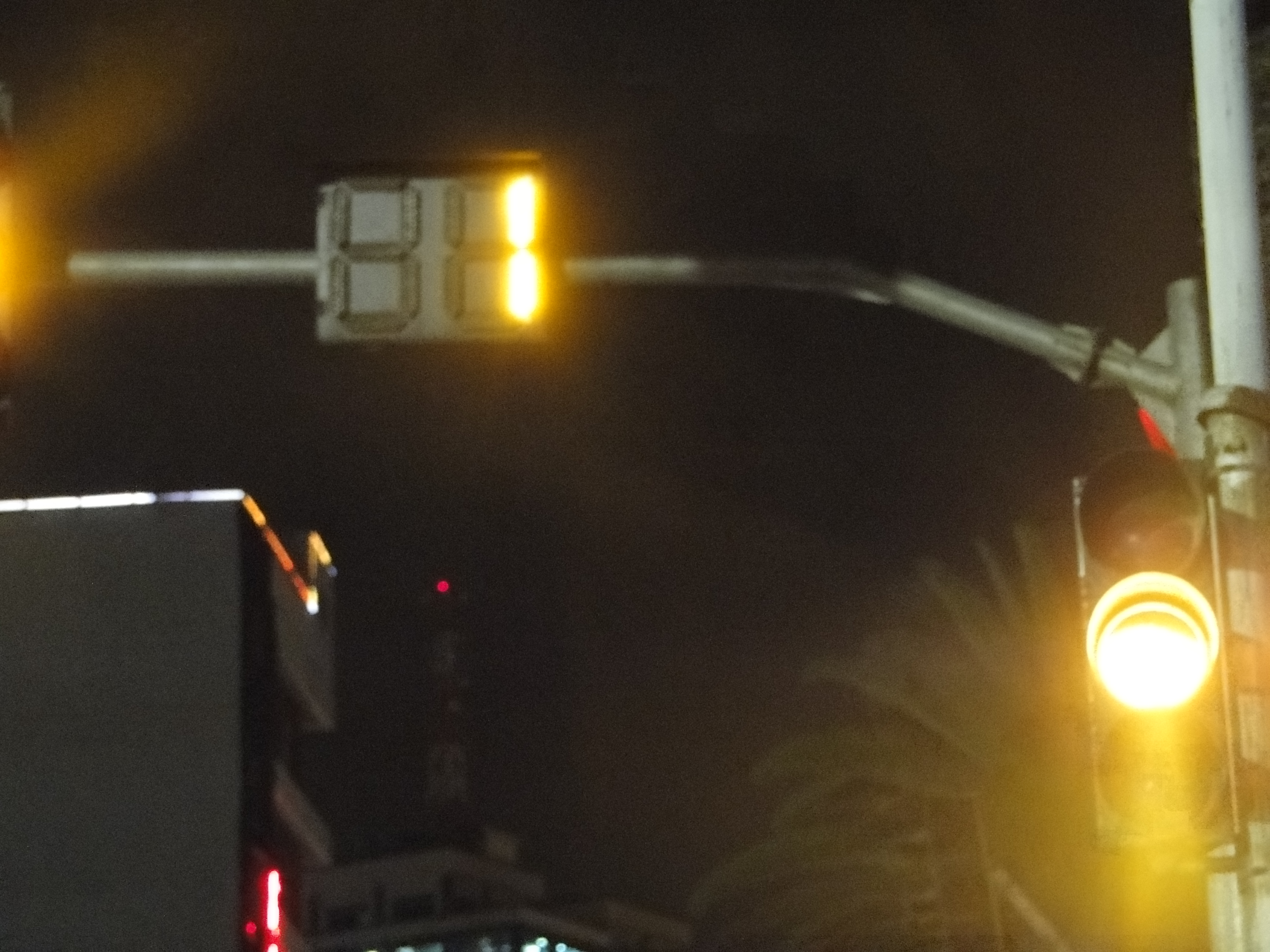
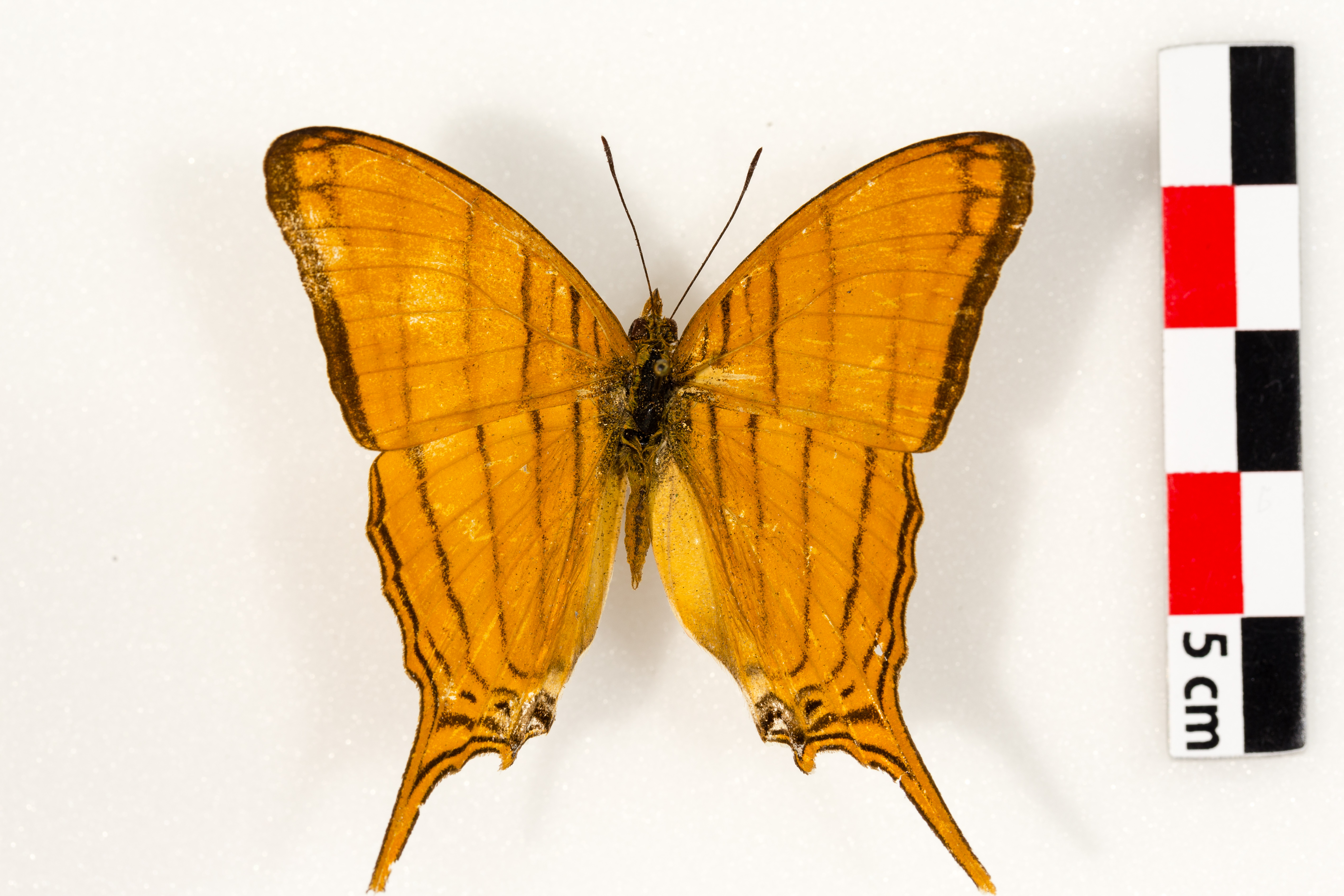
- Clockwise, from top left: Ant preserved in Baltic amber; Carved icon of Saint Nicholas; Marpesia berania; Traffic light in Nairobi; Bottom of a cider glass as seen from above.

Color coordinates
- Hex triplet: #FFBF00
- sRGB^{B} (r, g, b): (255, 191, 0)
- HSV (h, s, v): (45°, 100%, 100%)
- CIELCh_{uv} (L, C, h): (81, 99, 57°)
- Source: RGB and CMYK color systems
- ISCC–NBS descriptor: Vivid yellow
- B: Normalized to [0–255] (byte); H: Normalized to [0–100] (hundred)

The color amber is a pure chroma color, located on the color wheel midway between the colors of yellow and orange. The color name is derived from the material also known as amber, which is commonly found in a range of yellow-orange-brown-red colors; likewise, as a color, amber can refer to a range of yellow-orange colors. In English, the first recorded use of the term as a color name, rather than a reference to the specific substance, was in 1500.

Amber as a tertiary color on the RYB color wheel, and quaternary color on the RGB and CMYK color wheel
yellow
amber
orange

== SAE/ECE amber ==
Approximation of SAE/ECE Amber

Color coordinates
- Hex triplet: #FF7E00
- sRGB^{B} (r, g, b): (255, 126, 0)
- HSV (h, s, v): (30°, 100%, 100%)
- CIELCh_{uv} (L, C, h): (67, 124, 29°)
- ISCC–NBS descriptor: Vivid reddish orange
- B: Normalized to [0–255] (byte)

Amber is one of several technically defined colors used in automotive signal lamps. In North America, SAE standard J578 governs the colorimetry of vehicle lights, while outside North America the internationalized European ECE regulations hold force. Both standards designate a range of orange-yellow hues in the CIE color space as "amber".

In the past, the ECE amber definition was more restrictive than the SAE definition, but the current ECE definition is identical to the more permissive SAE standard. The SAE formally uses the term "yellow amber", though the color is most often referred to as "yellow". This is not the same as selective yellow, a color used in some fog lamps and headlamps.

=== Formal definitions ===
Previously, ECE amber was defined according to the 1968 Convention on Road Traffic, as follows:

Limit towards green	$y \le 0.429$
Limit towards red	$y \ge 0.398$
Limit towards white	$z \le 0.007$

Recent revisions to the ECE regulations have aligned ECE Amber with SAE Yellow, defined as follows:

Limit towards green	$y \le x - 0.120$
Limit towards red	$y \ge 0.390$
Limit towards white	$y \ge 0.790 - 0.670 x$

The entirety of these definitions lie outside the gamut of the sRGB color space — such a pure color cannot be represented using RGB primaries. The color box shown above is a desaturated approximation, produced by taking the centroid of the standard definition and moving it towards the D65 white point, until it meets the sRGB gamut triangle.

== Lighting ==
The color temperature of LED lamps is called amber when their wavelengths are about 590 nm. Chronomatic low-pressure sodium-vapor lamps emit light ranging from 580 to 590 nm.

== Cultural use ==
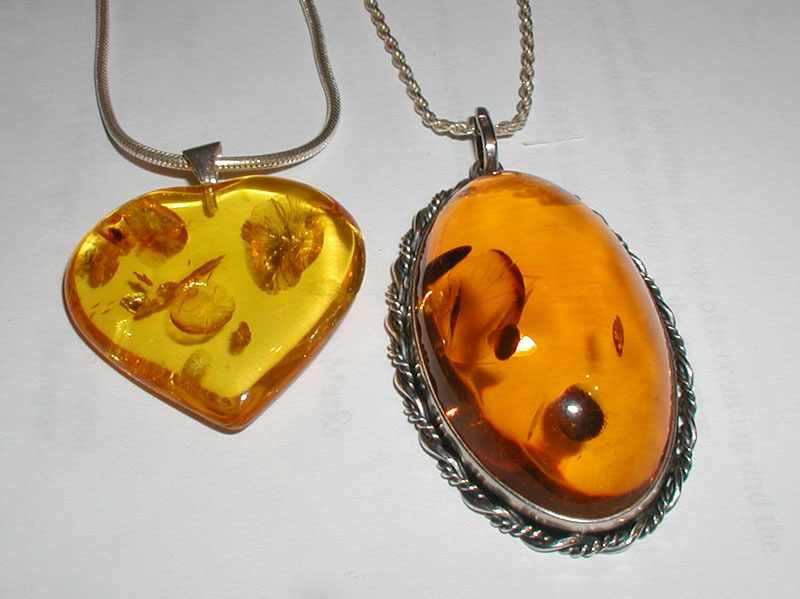
These pendants made of amber are also amber-colored.

Computers

- The Digital Equipment Corporation (DEC) VT220 computer terminals were available with amber phosphors in their CRTs.

Interior design

- The original Amber Room in the Catherine Palace of Tsarskoye Selo near Saint Petersburg was a complete chamber decoration of amber panels backed with gold leaf and mirrors. Due to its singular beauty, it was sometimes dubbed the "Eighth Wonder of the World".

Sports

- In Gaelic games, Armagh play in a darker amber color (the amber that is prevalent in the Irish flag), Offaly play in the original colors of the Irish flag (green, white and amber) and Kilkenny also play in black and amber, albeit a more yellow amber.
- Amber is a color worn by English football clubs Hull City AFC, Bradford City AFC, Barnet FC, Shrewsbury Town FC (As part of stripes), Mansfield Town, Cambridge United FC and Sutton United. Everton has incorporated amber in away and thirds kits, and as an accent color, since at least 1967. The color is also worn by the Scottish football club Motherwell FC, as well as many other sports clubs around the world.

Traffic engineering

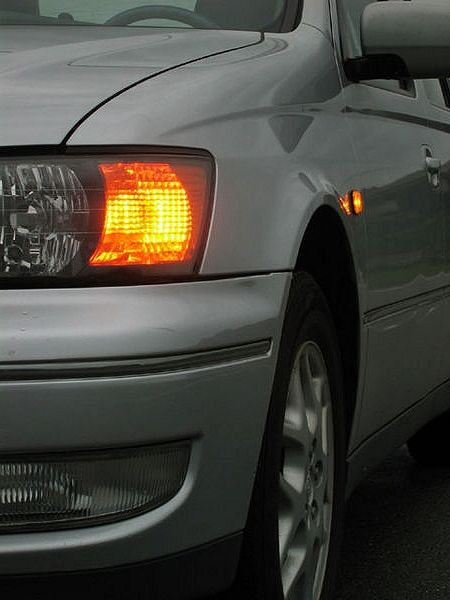
A turn signal emitting amber light

- Amber is used in traffic lights and turn signals.

Theatre

- Amber, sometimes named "Bastard Amber", along with "Moonlight Blue", is one of the two most common colors used in stage lighting.

== See also ==
- List of colors
