= Citron (color) =

Yellow color

Color coordinates
- Hex triplet: #DDD06A
- sRGB^{B} (r, g, b): (221, 208, 106)
- HSV (h, s, v): (53°, 52%, 87%)
- CIELCh_{uv} (L, C, h): (83, 67, 78°)
- Source: Xona.com
- ISCC–NBS descriptor: Strong greenish yellow
- B: Normalized to [0–255] (byte)

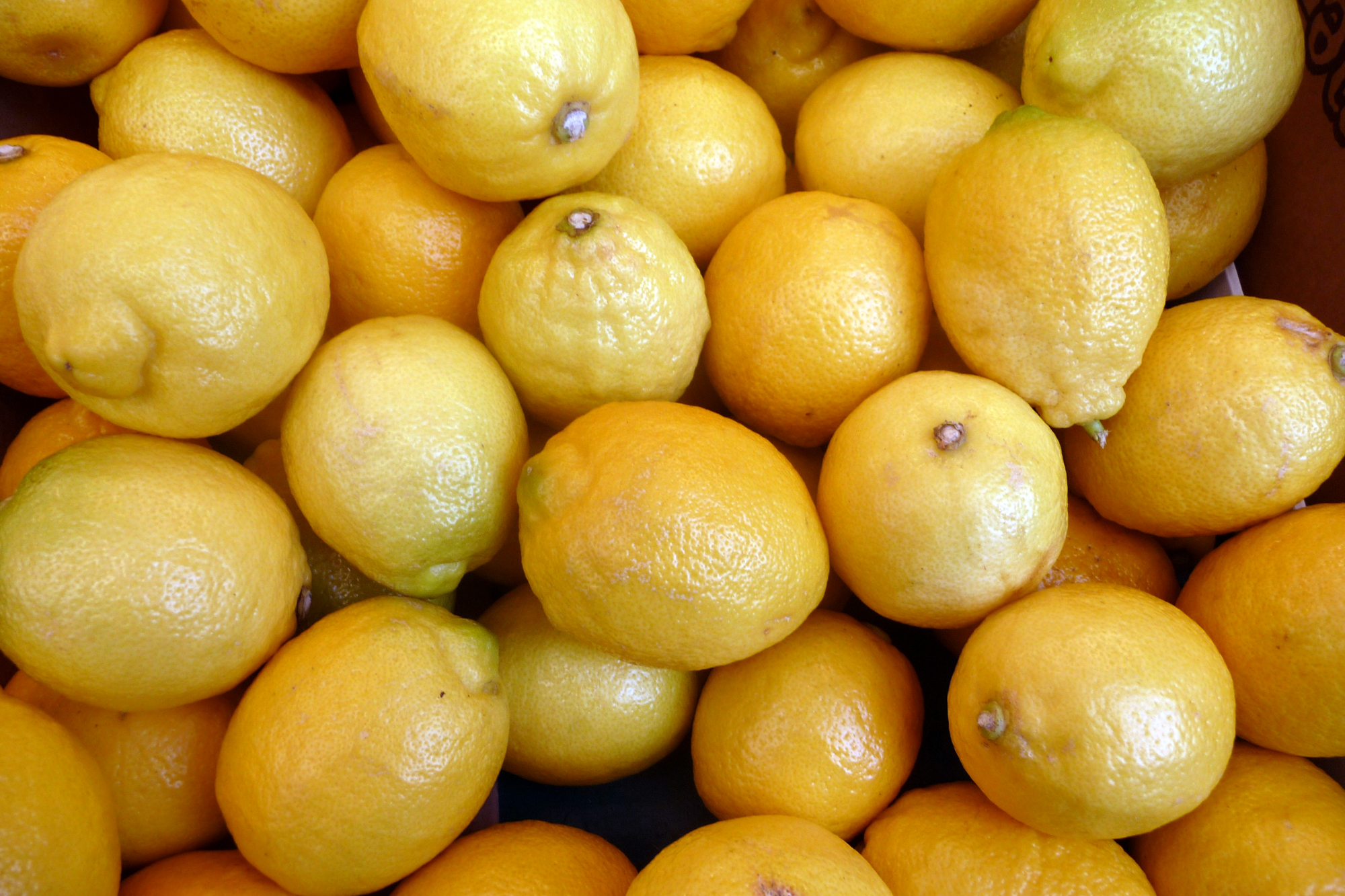
Citron fruits

Citron is a dark lemon color similar to that of the fruit citron. As a tertiary color on the RYB color wheel, it is an equal mix of orange and green pigments.

== See also ==
- Citrine (color)
- Lists of colors
