= Slate gray =

Color

Color coordinates
- Hex triplet: #708090
- sRGB^{B} (r, g, b): (112, 128, 144)
- HSV (h, s, v): (210°, 22%, 56%)
- CIELCh_{uv} (L, C, h): (53, 17, 239°)
- Source: X11
- ISCC–NBS descriptor: Grayish blue
- B: Normalized to [0–255] (byte)

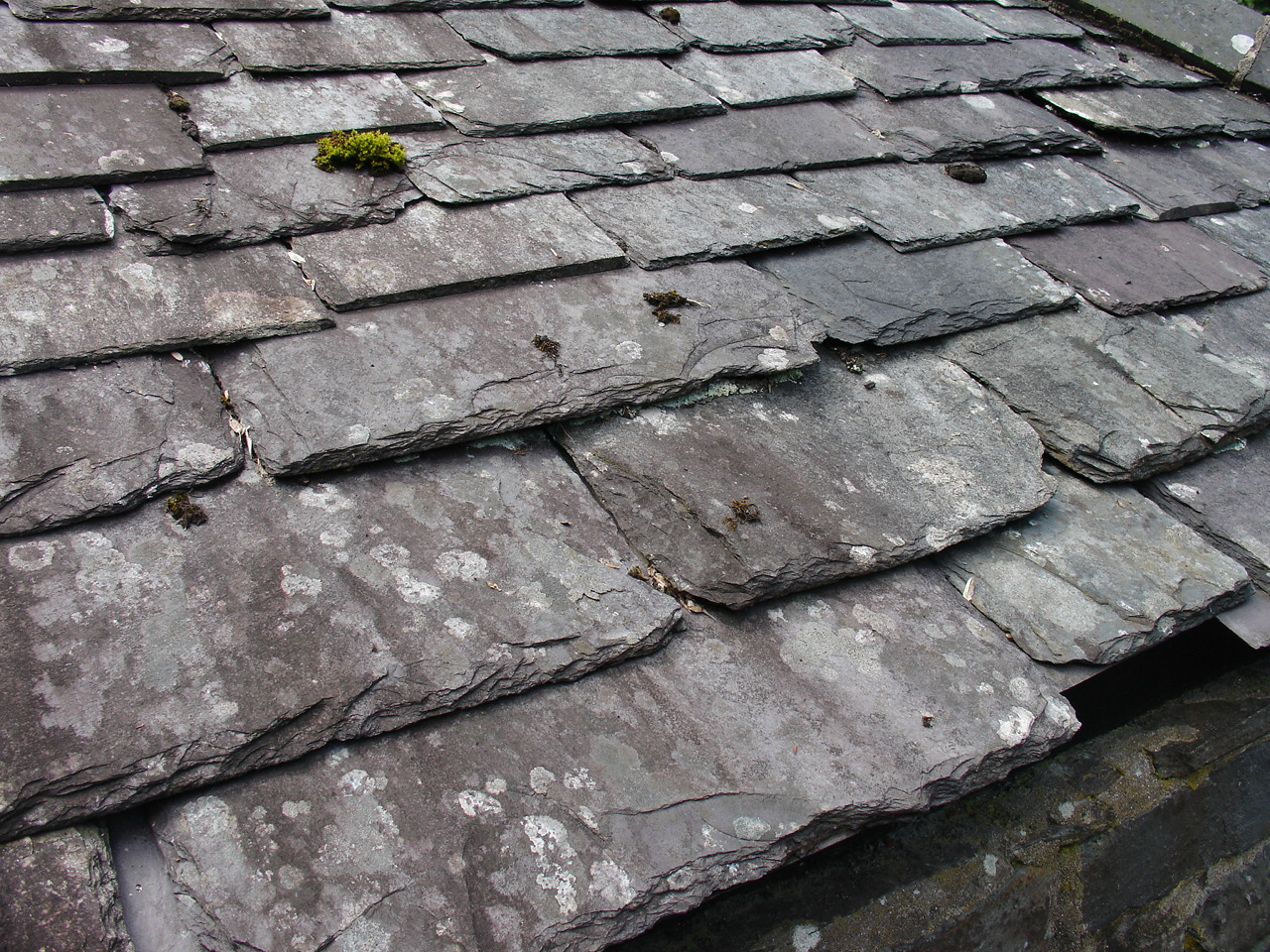
Slate roof

Slate as a tertiary color
purple	slate	green

Slate gray is a moderate shade of gray with a slight azure tinge, which represents the average color of slate, a metamorphic rock often used in stonemasonry. As a tertiary color, slate is an equal mix of purple and green pigments.

Slaty, referring to this color, is often used to describe birds.

The first recorded use of slate gray as a color name in English was in 1705.

== Variations ==
=== Light slate gray ===
Light slate gray

Color coordinates
- Hex triplet: #778899
- sRGB^{B} (r, g, b): (119, 136, 153)
- HSV (h, s, v): (210°, 22%, 60%)
- CIELCh_{uv} (L, C, h): (56, 19, 239°)
- Source: X11
- ISCC–NBS descriptor: Grayish blue
- B: Normalized to [0–255] (byte)

Displayed at right is the web color light slate gray.

=== Dark slate gray ===
Dark slate gray

Color coordinates
- Hex triplet: #2F4F4F
- sRGB^{B} (r, g, b): (47, 79, 79)
- HSV (h, s, v): (180°, 41%, 31%)
- CIELCh_{uv} (L, C, h): (31, 14, 192°)
- Source: X11
- ISCC–NBS descriptor: Dark bluish green
- B: Normalized to [0–255] (byte)

Displayed at right is the web color dark slate gray.

== In human culture ==
Computers

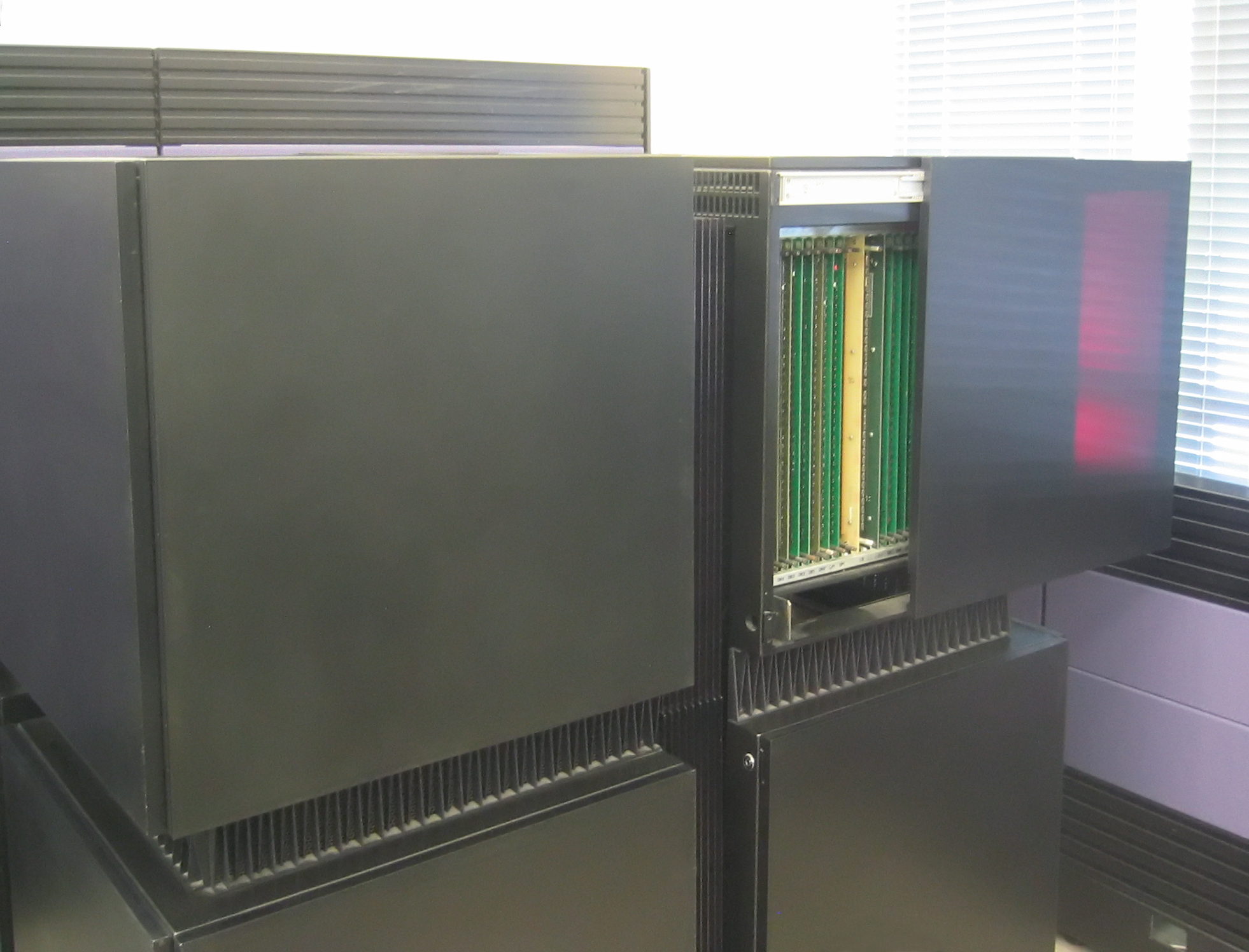
Mid-1980s supercomputer Thinking Machines CM-1 (the Connection Machine) at the Computer History Museum in Mountain View, California. One of the face plates has been partially removed to show the circuit boards inside.

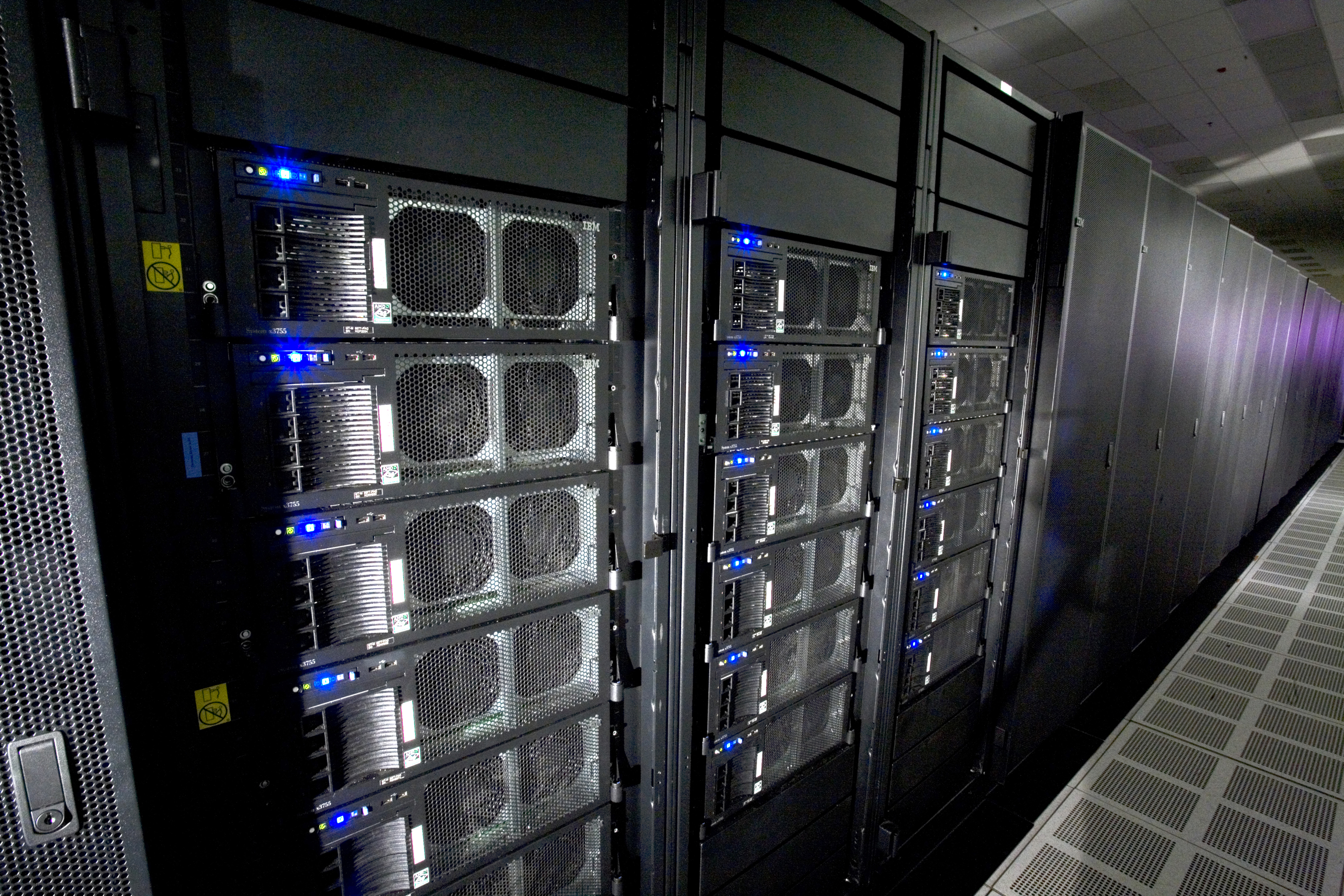
IBM Roadrunner supercomputer—the fastest supercomputer in the world in May 2008, it could operate at a speed of 1.026 petaflops

- The exterior shells of supercomputers are often colored various shades of slate gray.
- The iPhone 5 and the iPad Mini comes in a dark slate gray colored aluminum body contrasted with black.
- Western Electric used the term SLATE for the color instead of gray in their 25-pair (and multiples) cable for pairs 5-10-15-20-25.

Transportation

The New York City Subway shuttle bullet, used on three New York City Subway shuttle services.

- The S New York City Subway service bullet, used in three out of the system's 28 services, is colored slate gray.

Military

- The Fleet Air Arm aircraft Temperate Day Scheme in the World War Two was dark slate gray over extra dark sea gray on top sides and Sky on undersides. This scheme was referred as "slime over sludge".

== See also ==
- Shades of gray
  - Cadet gray
