= Color wheel =

Illustrative organization of color hues

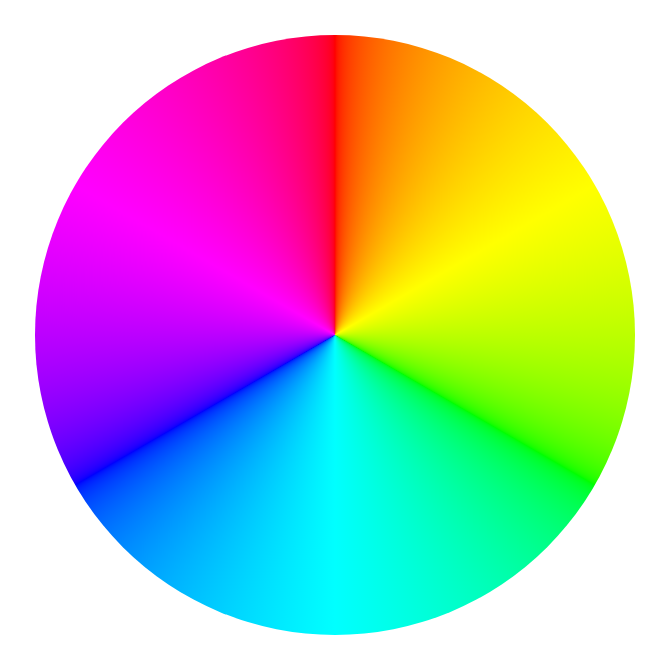
Gradient RGB/CMY color wheel

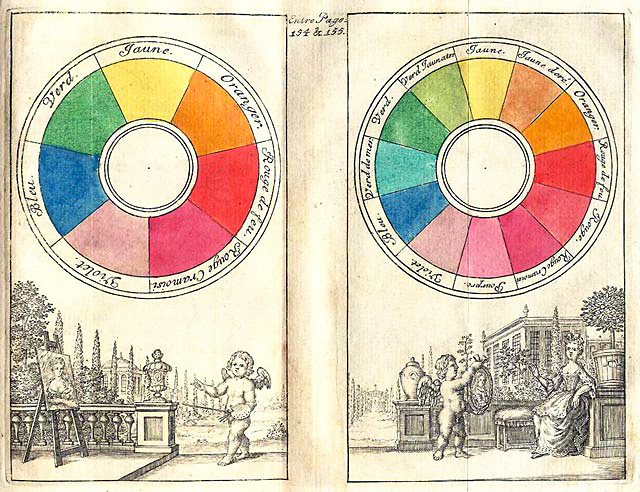
Seven-color and twelve-color color circles from 1708 (attributed to Claude Boutet)

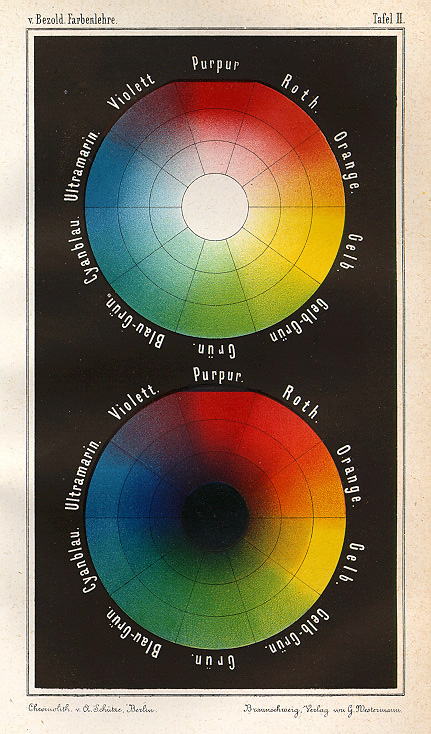
Wilhelm von Bezold's 1874 Farbentafel

A color wheel or color circle is an abstract illustrative organization of color hues around a circle, which shows the relationships between primary colors, secondary colors, tertiary colors, etc.

Some sources use the terms color wheel and color circle interchangeably; however, one term or the other may be more prevalent in certain fields or certain versions as mentioned above. For instance, some reserve the term color wheel for mechanical rotating devices, such as color tops, filter wheels or the Newton disc. Others classify various color wheels as color disc, color chart, and color scale varieties.

== History ==
The color wheel dates back to Isaac Newton's work on color and light. In his book Opticks, Newton presented a color circle to illustrate the relations between these colors. The original color circle of Isaac Newton showed only the spectral hues and was provided to illustrate a rule for the color of mixtures of lights, that these could be approximately predicted from the center of gravity of the numbers of "rays" of each spectral color present (represented in his diagram by small circles). The divisions of Newton's circle are of unequal size, being based on the intervals of a Dorian musical scale. Most later color circles include the purples, however, between red and violet, and have equal-sized hue divisions. Color scientists and psychologists often use the additive primaries, red, green, and blue; and often refer to their arrangement around a circle as a color circle as opposed to a color wheel.

Thomas Young postulated that the eye contains receptors that respond to three different primary sensations, or spectra of light. James Clerk Maxwell showed that all hues, and almost all colors, can be created from three primary colors such as red, green, and blue, if they are mixed in the right proportions. Goethe's Theory of Colours provided the first systematic study of the physiological effects of color (1810). His observations on the effect of opposed colors led him to a symmetric arrangement of his color wheel anticipating Ewald Hering's opponent color theory (1872).

... for the colours diametrically opposed to each other ... are those that reciprocally evoke each other in the eye.

— Goethe, Theory of Colours

== Colors of the color wheel ==
=== Trichromatic model ===
Most color wheels are based on three primary colors, three secondary colors, and the six intermediates formed by mixing a primary with a secondary, known as tertiary colors, for a total of 12 main divisions; some add more intermediates, for 24 named colors. They make use of the trichromatic model of color.

==== Subtractive ====
A 1908 color wheel with red, green, and violet "plus colors" and magenta, yellow, and cyan blue "minus colors".

The typical artists' paint or pigment color wheel includes the blue, red, and yellow primary colors. The corresponding secondary colors are green, orange, and violet, or purple. The tertiary colors are green-yellow, yellow-orange, orange-red, red-violet/purple, purple/violet-blue and blue-green.

Non-digital visual artists typically use red, yellow, and blue primaries (RYB color model) arranged at three equally spaced points around their color wheel. Printers and others who use modern subtractive color methods and terminology use cyan, magenta, and yellow as subtractive primaries. Intermediate and interior points of color wheels and circles represent color mixtures. In a paint or subtractive color wheel, the 'center of gravity' is usually (but not always) black, representing all colors of light being absorbed.

==== Additive ====
A color wheel based on RGB (red, green, blue) additive primaries has cyan, magenta, and yellow secondaries. Alternatively, the same arrangement of colors around a circle can be described as based on cyan, magenta, and yellow subtractive primaries, with red, green, and blue being secondaries. Sometimes a RGV (red, green, violet) triad is used instead. In an additive color circle, the center is white or gray, indicating a mixture of different wavelengths of light (all wavelengths, or two complementary colors, for example).

A color wheel based on HSV, labeled with HTML color keywords.

The HSL and HSV color spaces are simple geometric transformations of the RGB cube into cylindrical form. The outer top circle of the HSV cylinder – or the outer middle circle of the HSL cylinder – can be thought of as a color wheel. There is no authoritative way of labelling the colors in such a color wheel, but the six colors which fall at the corners of the RGB cube are given names in the X11 color list, and are named keywords in HTML.

=== Opponent process model ===
Some color wheels are based on the four opponent process colors - red, yellow, blue and green. This includes those of the Natural Color System.

== The color circle and color vision ==
sRGB rendering of the spectrum of visible light
Color	Wavelength (nm)	Frequency (THz)	Photon energy (eV)
violet	380–450	670–790	2.75–3.26
blue	450–485	620–670	2.56–2.75
cyan	485–500	600–620	2.48–2.56
green	500–565	530–600	2.19–2.48
yellow	565–590	510–530	2.10–2.19
orange	590–625	480–510	1.98–2.10
red	625–750	400–480	1.65–1.98

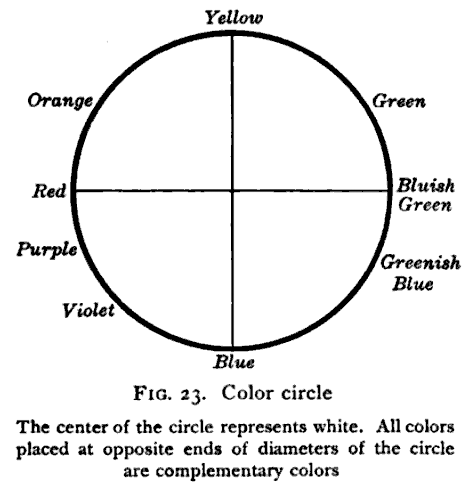
A 1917 four-way color circle related to the color opponent process.

A color circle based on spectral wavelengths appears with red at one end of the spectrum and is 100% mixable violet at the other. A wedge-shaped gap represents colors that have no unique spectral frequency. These extra-spectral colors, the purples, form from an additive mixture of colors from the ends of the spectrum.

In normal human vision, wavelengths of between about 400 nm and 700 nm are represented by this incomplete circle, with the longer wavelengths equating to the red end of the spectrum. Complement colors are located directly opposite each other on this wheel. These complement colors are not identical to colors in pigment mixing (such as are used in paint), but when lights are additively mixed in the correct proportions appear as a neutral grey or white.

The color circle is used for, among other purposes, illustrating additive color mixture. Combining two colored lights from different parts of the spectrum will produce a third color that appears like a light from another part of the spectrum, even though dissimilar wavelengths are involved. This type of color matching is known as metameric matching. Thus, a combination of green and red light will produce the color yellow in apparent hue. The newly formed color lies between the two original colors on the color circle.

Objects may be viewed under a variety of different lighting conditions. The human visual system is able to adapt to these differences by chromatic adaptation. This aspect of the visual system is relatively easy to mislead, and optical illusions relating to color are therefore a common phenomenon. The color circle is a useful tool for examining these illusions.

Arranging spectral colors in a circle to predict admixture of light stems from work by Sir Isaac Newton. Newton's calculation of the resulting color involves three steps: First, mark on the color circle the constituent colors according to their relative weight. Second, find the barycenter of these differently weighted colors. Third, interpret the radial distance (from the center of the circle to the barycenter) as the saturation of the color, and the azimuthal position on the circle as the hue of the color. Thus, Newton's color circle is a predecessor of the modern, horseshoe-shaped CIE color diagram.

The psychophysical theory behind the color circle dates to the early color triangle of Thomas Young, whose work was later extended by James Clerk Maxwell and Hermann von Helmholtz.

== Color wheels and paint color mixing ==
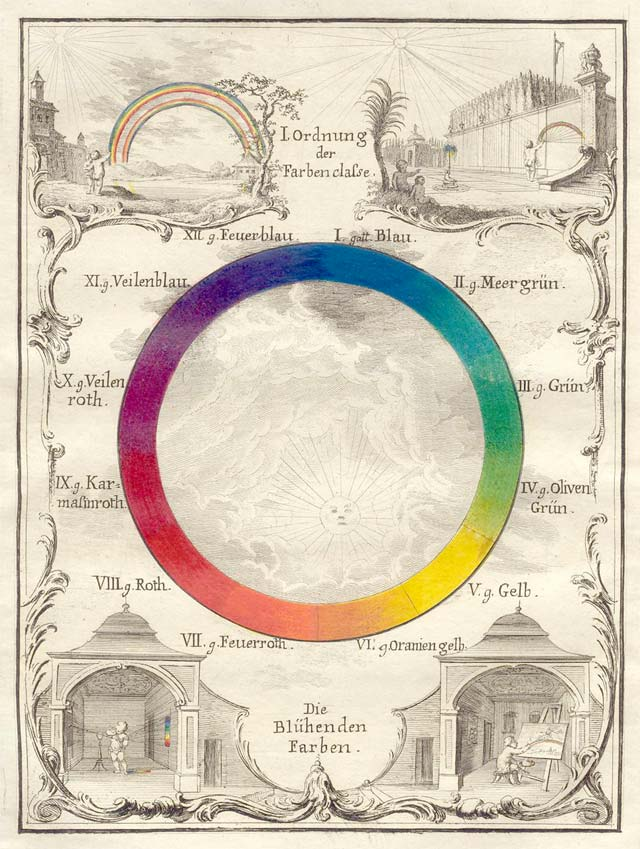
Ignaz Schiffermüller, Versuch eines Farbensystems (Vienna, 1772), plate I. Color wheels can be used to create pleasing color schemes.

There is no straight-line relationship between colors mixed in pigment, which vary from medium to medium. With a psychophysical color circle, however, the resulting hue of any mixture of two colored light sources can be determined simply by the relative brightness and wavelength of the two lights. A similar calculation cannot be performed with two paints. As such, a painter's color wheel is indicative rather than predictive, being used to compare existing colors rather than calculate exact colors of mixtures. Because of differences relating to the medium, different color wheels can be created according to the type of paint or other medium used, and many artists make their own individual color wheels. These often contain only blocks of color rather than the gradation between tones that is characteristic of the color circle.

=== Color wheel software ===
Interactive color-wheel software allows users to select a base color and generate related color schemes, including complementary, analogous, triadic, and monochromatic combinations. Digital color wheels often represent hue as an angle in a cylindrical color space such as HSL, with complementary colors positioned on opposite sides of the wheel and triadic colors spaced evenly around it.

== Color schemes ==
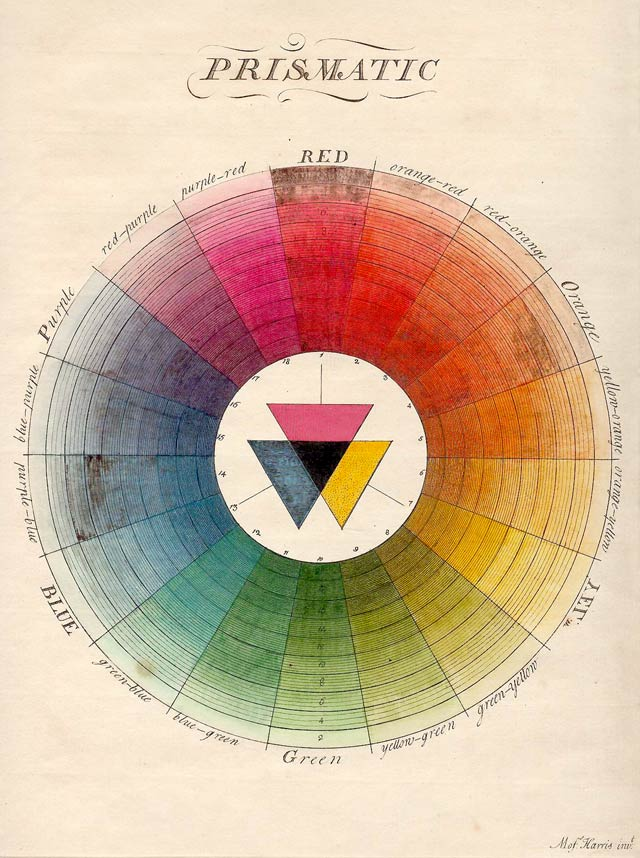
Moses Harris, in his book The Natural System of Colours (1776), presented this color palette.

In color theory, a color scheme is the choice of colors used in design for a range of media. For example, the use of a white background with black text is an example of a common default color scheme in web design.

Color schemes are logical combinations of colors on the color wheel. Color schemes are used to create style and appeal. Colors that create an aesthetic feeling together commonly appear together in color schemes. A basic color scheme uses two colors that look appealing together. More advanced color schemes involve several colors in combination, usually based around a single color—for example, text with such colors as red, yellow, orange and light blue arranged together on a black background in a magazine article. Color schemes can also contain different shades of a single color; for example, a color scheme that mixes different shades of green, ranging from very light (almost white) to very dark.

Complementary colors are two colors directly across from each other; for example, red and cyan are complementary colors. Tetradic color palettes use four colors, a pair of complementary color pairs. For example, one could use yellow, spring green, blue, and rose. Tetrad colors can be found by putting a square or rectangle on the color wheel. An analogous color scheme is made up of colors next to each other on the wheel. For example, red, orange, and yellow are analogous colors. Monochromatic colors are different shades of the same color. For example, periwinkle, blue, and navy blue. Complementary colors are colors across from each other on a color wheel. For example, blue and yellow. Triadic colors are colors that are evenly across from each other, in a triangle over the color wheel. For example, the additive primary colors red, green, and blue are triadic colors.

== Gallery ==
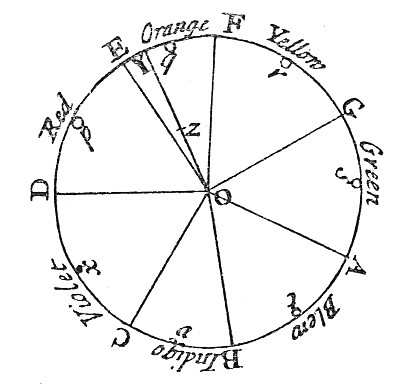
Newton's asymmetric color wheel based on musical intervals. Mixing "rays" in amounts given by the circles yields color "z" (1704)

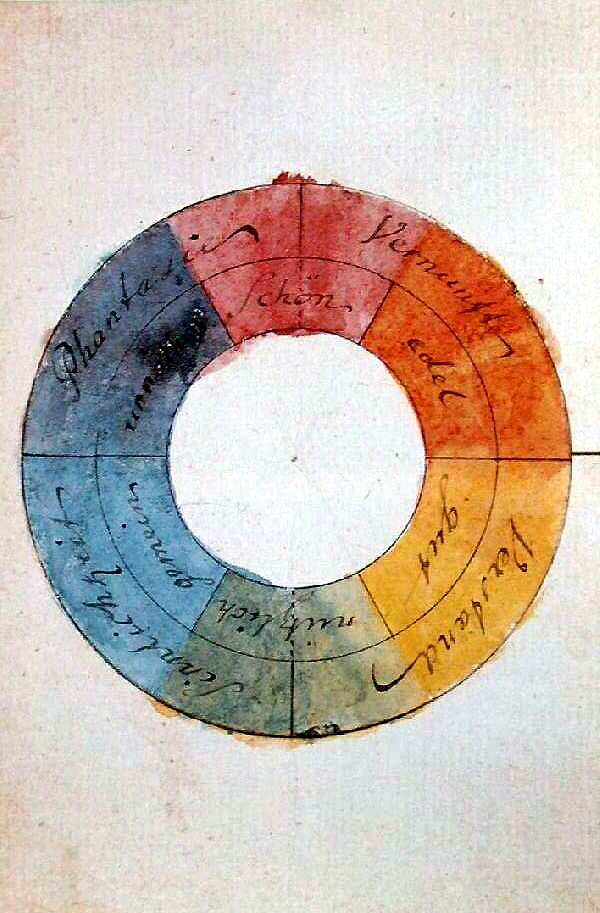
Goethe's symmetric color wheel with 'reciprocally evoked colors' (1810)

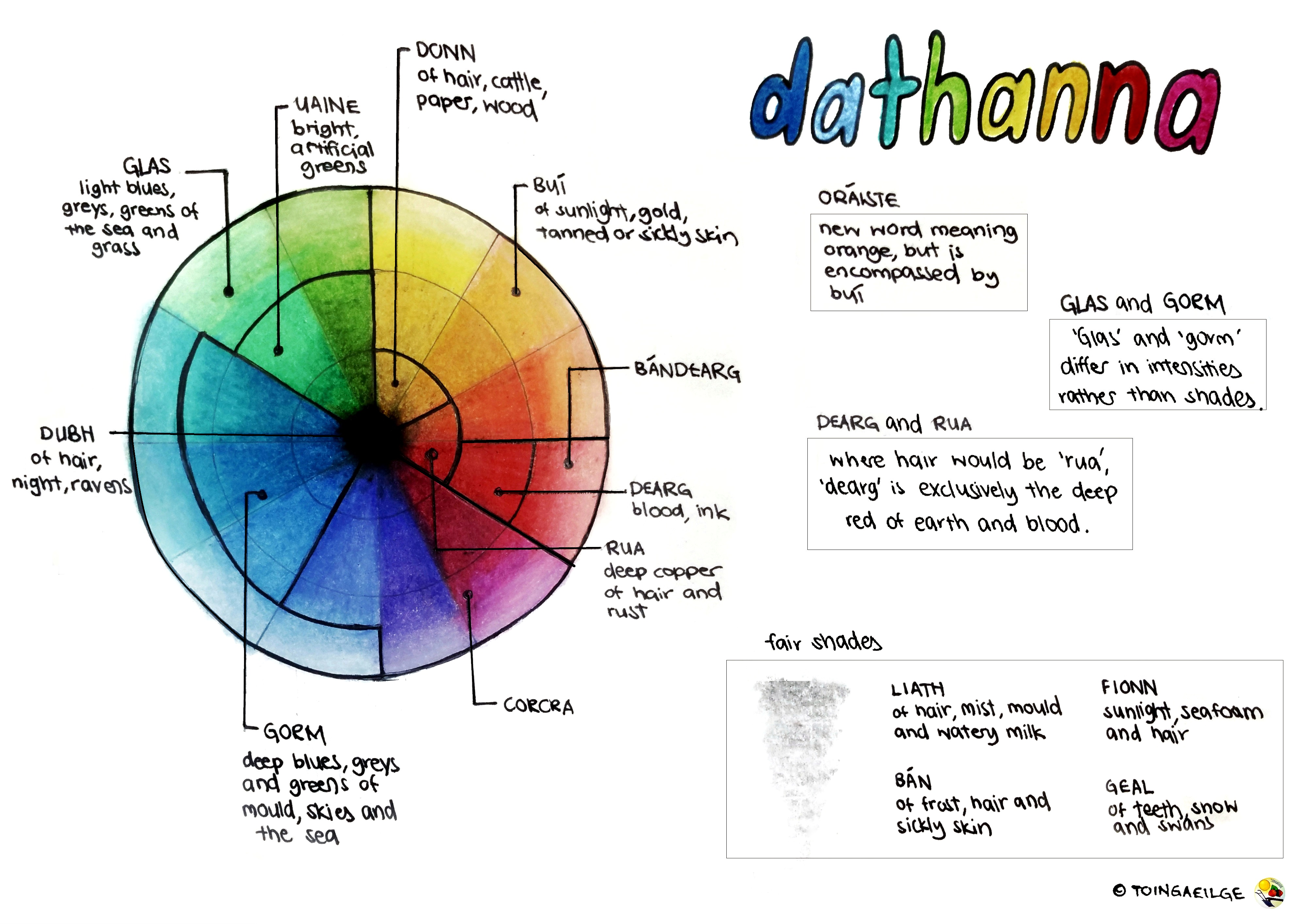
Dathanna colour wheel with Irish Gaelic colour terms, explaining that glas ("pale blue/grey/green") and gorm ("deep blue/grey/green") are distinguished based on intensity (luminosity) rather than hue. Similarly, buí refers not only to "yellow" and "gold", but pale browns as "buff beige" and "ochre", while dunn is for darker browns. Rua refers to red of hair (fox, robin), whereas dearg refers to red of blood and bándearg is "pale red". Then, Bán, fionn, geal, and liath all refer to varying degrees of brightness or "fairness" — without mapping clearly only the English "white" — against dubh for "dark" or "black".

A color circle based on additive combinations of the light spectrum, after Schiffman (1990)

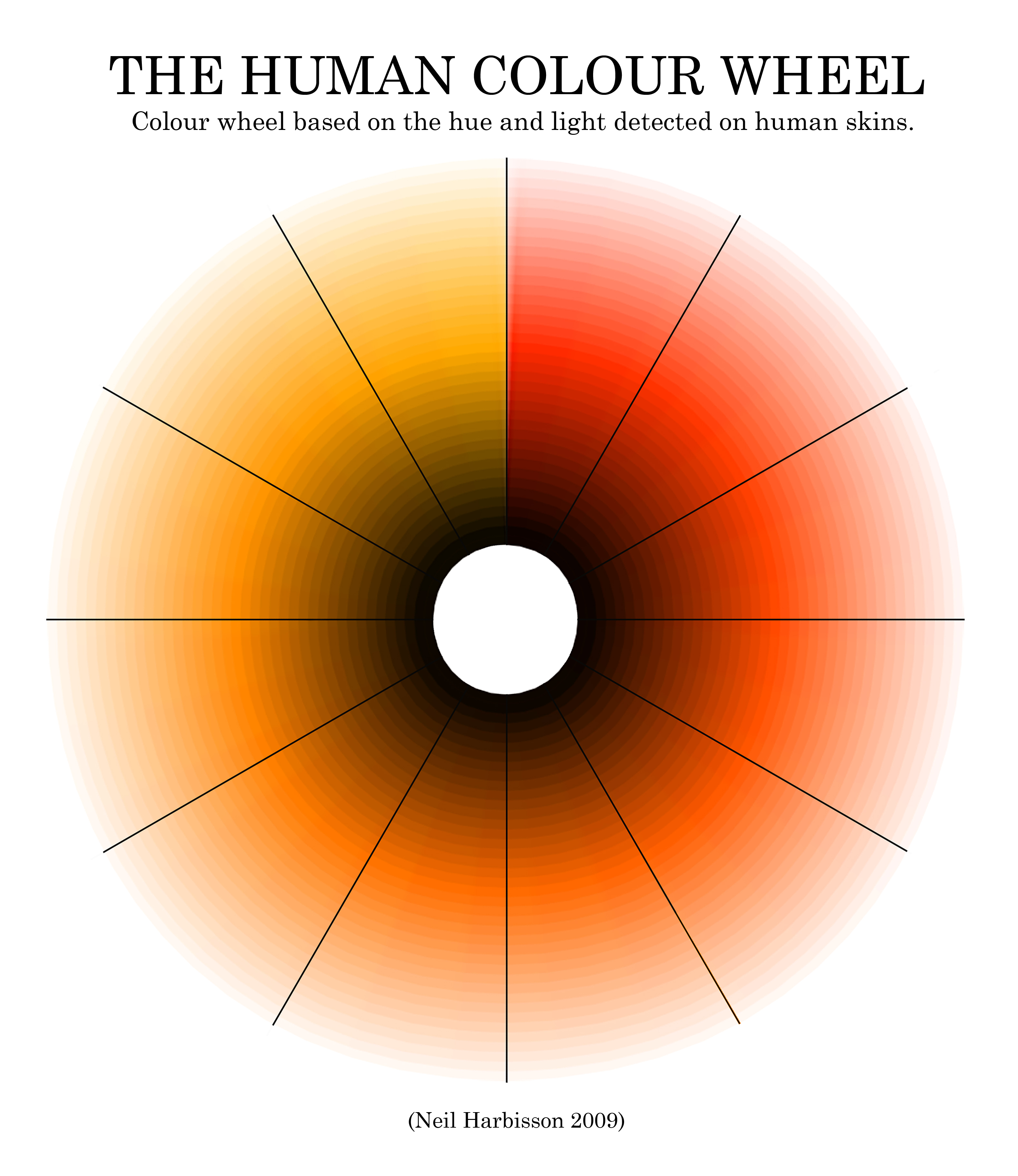
Human Color Wheel based on the hue and light detected on human skins, after Harbisson (2004–2009)

RGB color wheel

RYB color wheel

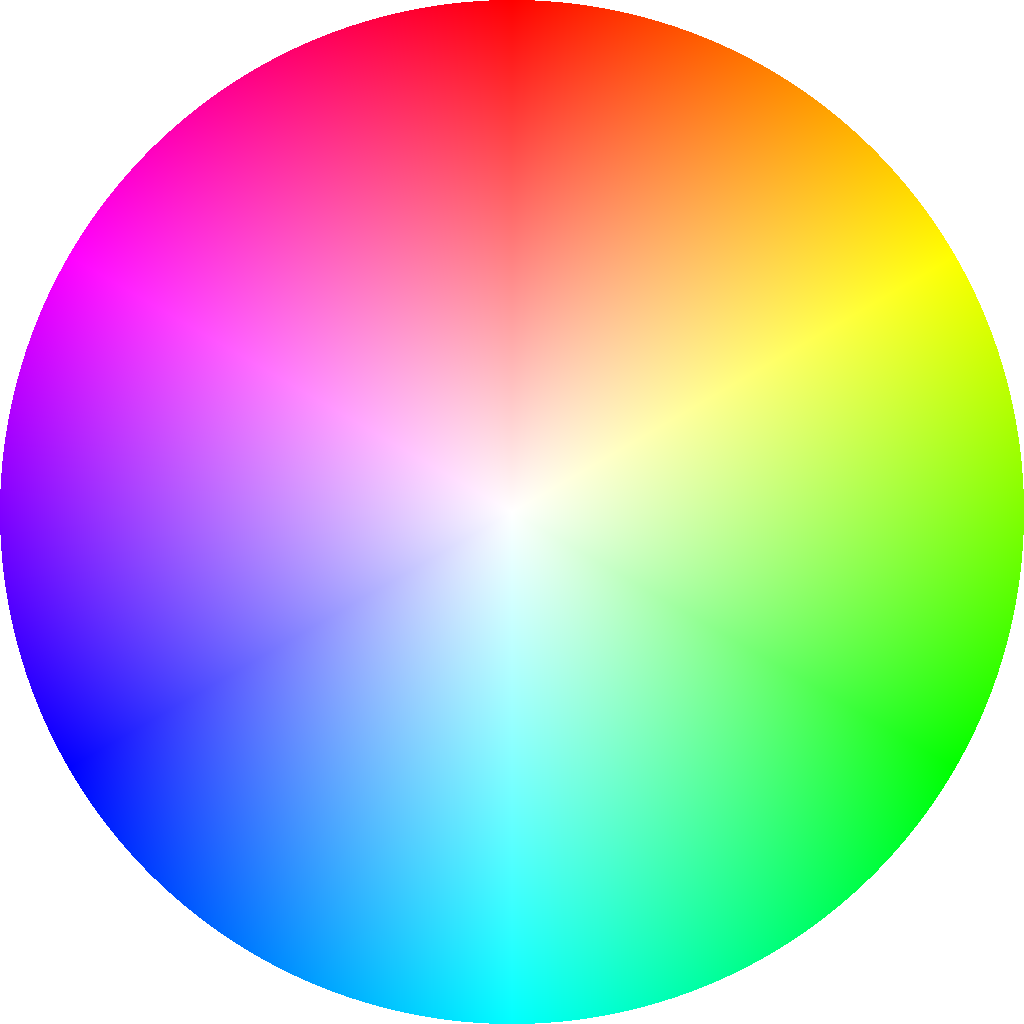
Color circle based on the HSV color space, showing all colors with a value (brightness) of 255 (100%). White is at the center, and fully saturated colors are at the outer edge. It is the circular face of the HSV "color cone".

== See also ==
- Circle of fifths
- Color theory
- Visual perception
- Psychophysics
- Color solid
- Spectral color
- Octave
- Color blindness
- Color picker
