= Spectrum =

Continuous range of values, such as wavelengths in physics

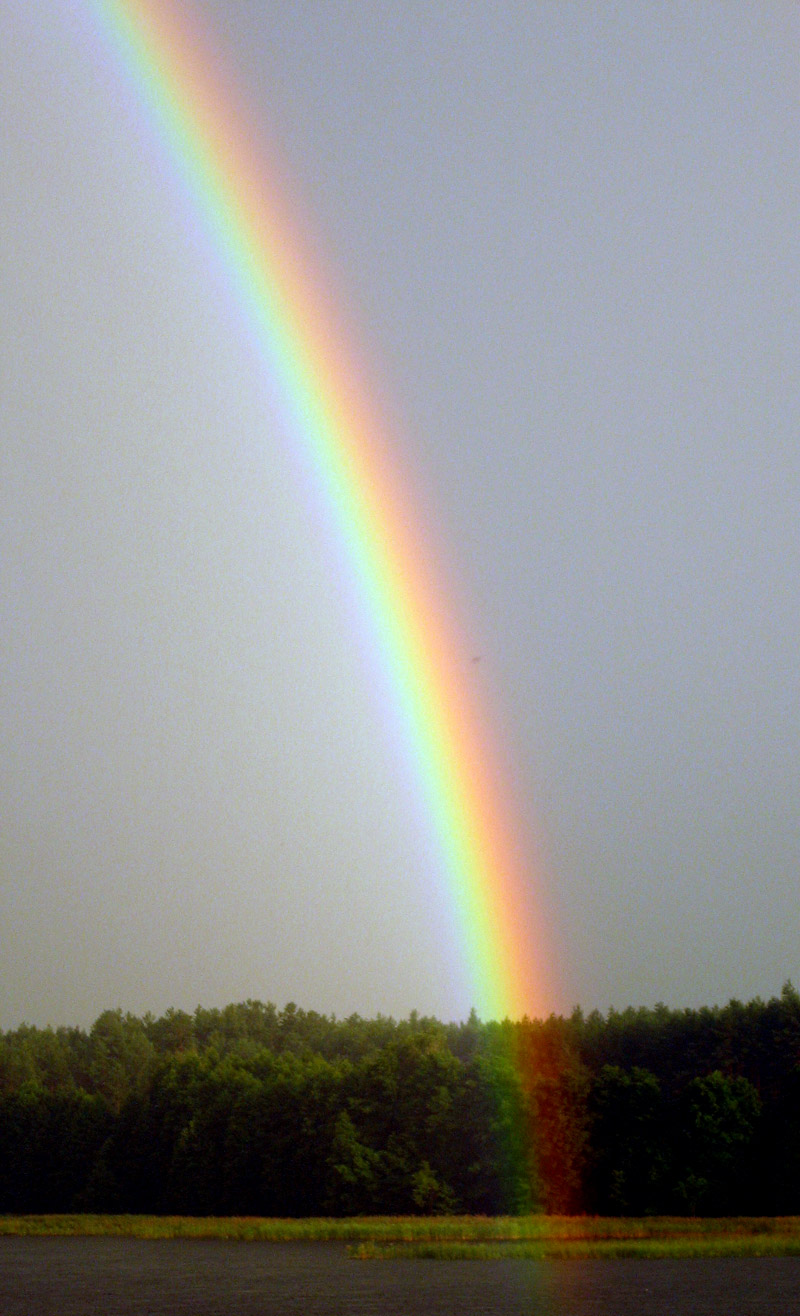
The spectrum in a rainbow

A spectrum (pl.: spectra or spectrums) is a set of related ideas, objects, or properties whose features overlap such that they blend to form a continuum. The word spectrum was first used scientifically in optics to describe the rainbow of colors in visible light after passing through a prism. In the optical spectrum, light wavelength is viewed as continuous, and spectral colors are seen to blend into one another smoothly when organized in order of their corresponding wavelengths. As scientific understanding of light advanced, the term came to apply to the entire electromagnetic spectrum, including radiation not visible to the human eye.

Spectrum has since been applied by analogy to topics outside optics. Thus, one might talk about the "spectrum of political opinion", or the "spectrum of activity" of a drug, or the "autism spectrum". In these uses, values within a spectrum may not be associated with precisely quantifiable numbers or definitions. Such uses imply a broad range of conditions or behaviors grouped together and studied under a single title for ease of discussion. Nonscientific uses of the term spectrum are sometimes misleading. For instance, a single left–right spectrum of political opinion does not capture the full range of people's political beliefs. Political scientists use a variety of biaxial and multiaxial systems to more accurately characterize political opinion.

In most modern usages of spectrum there is a unifying theme between the extremes at either end. This was not always true in older usage.

== Etymology ==
In Latin, spectrum means "image" or "apparition", including the meaning "spectre". Spectral evidence is testimony about what was done by spectres of persons not present physically, or hearsay evidence about what ghosts or apparitions of Satan said. It was used to convict a number of persons of witchcraft at Salem, Massachusetts in the late 17th century. The word "spectrum" [Spektrum] was strictly used to designate a ghostly optical afterimage by Goethe in his Theory of Colors and Schopenhauer in On Vision and Colors.

The prefix "spectro-" is used to form words relating to spectra. For example, a spectrometer is a device used to record spectra and spectroscopy is the use of a spectrometer for chemical analysis.

== Physical sciences ==
Diagram illustrating the electromagnetic spectrum

In the physical sciences, spectrum describes any continuous range of either frequency or wavelength values. The term initially referred to the range of observed colors as white light is dispersed through a prism — introduced to optics by Isaac Newton in the 17th century.

The concept was later expanded to other waves, such as sound waves and sea waves that also present a variety of frequencies and wavelengths (e.g., noise spectrum, sea wave spectrum). Starting from Fourier analysis, the concept of spectrum expanded to signal theory, where the signal can be graphed as a function of frequency and information can be placed in selected ranges of frequency. Presently, any quantity directly dependent on, and measurable along the range of, a continuous independent variable can be graphed along its range or spectrum. Examples are the range of electron energy in electron spectroscopy or the range of mass-to-charge ratio in mass spectrometry.

== Biological science ==
Antibiotic spectrum of activity is a component of antibiotic classification. A broad-spectrum antibiotic is active against a wide range of bacteria, whereas a narrow-spectrum antibiotic is effective against specific families of bacteria. An example of a commonly used broad-spectrum antibiotic is ampicillin. An example of a narrow spectrum antibiotic is Dicloxacillin, which acts on beta-lactamase-producing Gram-positive bacteria such as Staphylococcus aureus.

In psychiatry, the spectrum approach uses the term spectrum to describe a range of linked conditions, sometimes also extending to include singular symptoms and traits. For example, the autism spectrum describes a range of conditions classified as neurodevelopmental disorders.

== Mathematics ==
In mathematics, the spectrum of a matrix is the multiset of the eigenvalues of the matrix.

In functional analysis, the concept of the spectrum of a bounded operator is a generalization of the eigenvalue concept for matrices.

In algebraic topology, a spectrum is an object representing a generalized cohomology theory.

== Social science ==
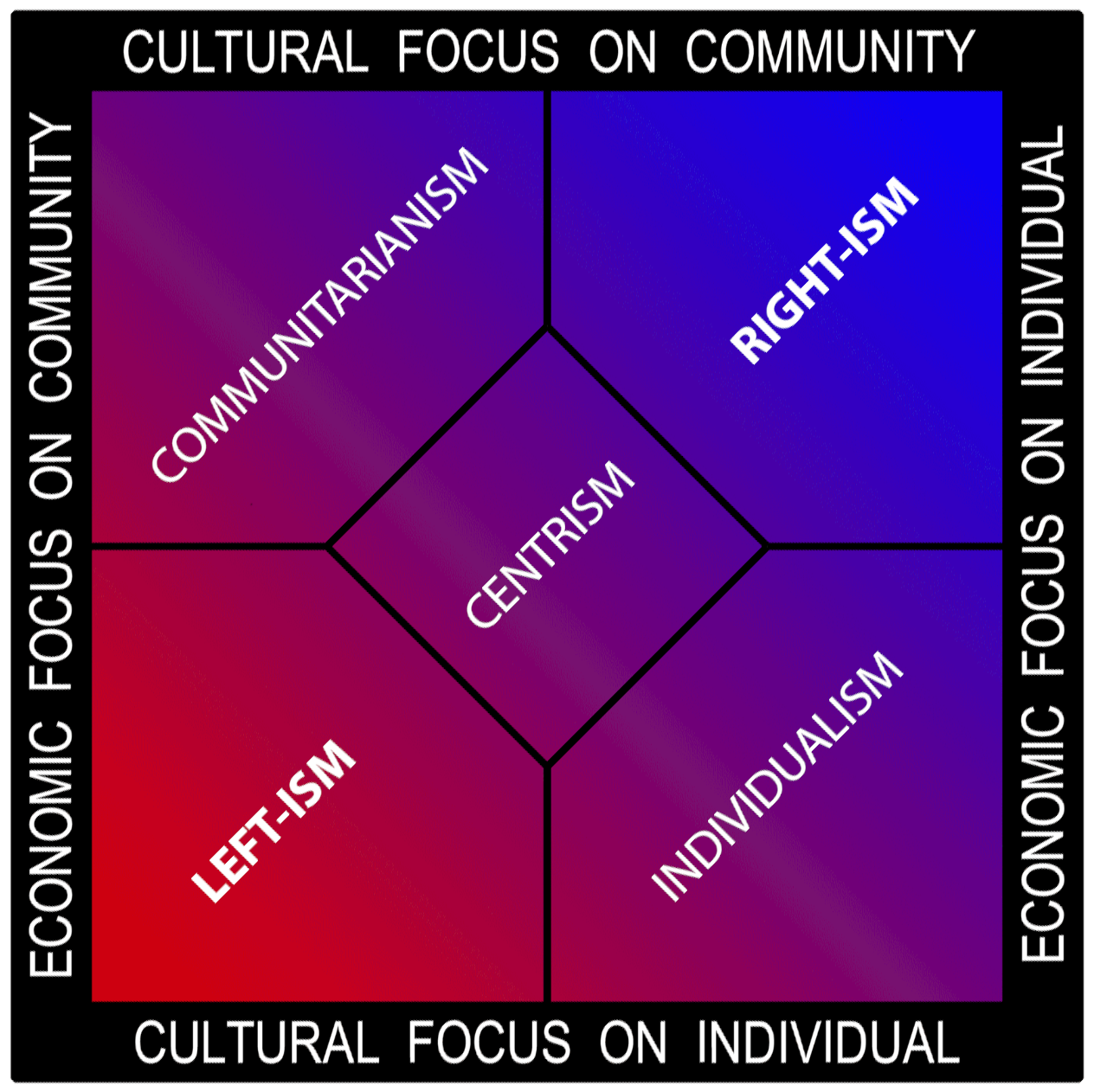
A Nolan chart of the political spectrum using (red leftism and blue rightism) coding

In social science, economic spectrum is used to indicate the range of social class along some indicator of wealth or income. In political science, the term political spectrum refers to a system of classifying political positions in one or more dimensions, for example in a range including right wing and left wing.
