= Theory of Colours =

1810 book by Johann Wolfgang von Goethe

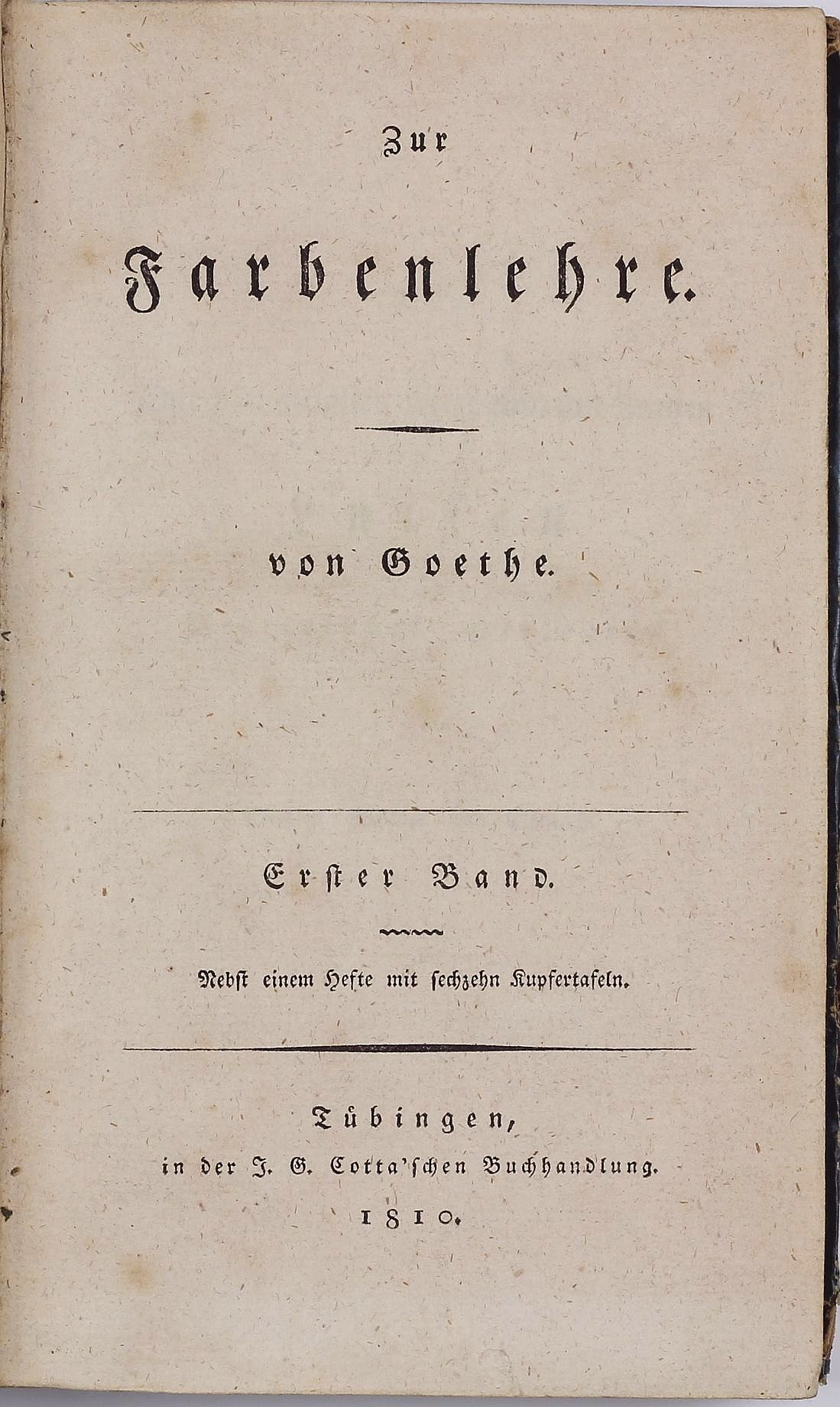
- Title page of first edition, 1810
- Author: Johann Wolfgang von Goethe
- Original title: Zur Farbenlehre
- Translator: Charles Lock Eastlake
- Language: German
- Publisher: John Murray
- Publication date: 1810
- English publication date: 1840
- OCLC: 318274261

Light spectrum, from Theory of Colours – Goethe observed that colour arises at the edges, and the spectrum occurs where these coloured edges overlap.

Theory of Colours (German: Zur Farbenlehre, lit. 'On color theory') is a book by Johann Wolfgang von Goethe about the poet's views on the nature of colours and how they are perceived by humans. It was published in German in 1810 and in English in 1840. The book contains detailed descriptions of phenomena such as coloured shadows, refraction, and chromatic aberration. The book is a successor to two short essays titled "Contributions to Optics" (German: Beiträge zur Optik).

The work originated in Goethe's occupation with painting and primarily had its influence in the arts, with painters such as (Philipp Otto Runge, J. M. W. Turner, the Pre-Raphaelites, Hilma af Klint, and Wassily Kandinsky).

Although Goethe's work was rejected by some physicists, a number of philosophers and physicists have concerned themselves with it, including Thomas Johann Seebeck, Arthur Schopenhauer (see: On Vision and Colors), Hermann von Helmholtz, Ludwig Wittgenstein, Werner Heisenberg, Kurt Gödel, and Mitchell Feigenbaum.

Goethe's book provides a catalogue of how colour is perceived in a wide variety of circumstances, and considers Isaac Newton's observations to be special cases. Unlike Newton, Goethe's concern was not so much with the analytic treatment of colour, as with the qualities of how phenomena are perceived. Philosophers have come to understand the distinction between the optical spectrum, as observed by Newton, and the phenomenon of human colour perception as presented by Goethe—a subject analyzed at length by Ludwig Wittgenstein in his comments on Goethe's theory in Remarks on Colour and in Jonathan Westphal's Commentary on this work (1991).

== Historical background ==
Reddish-yellow edges overlap blue-cyan edges to form green.

At Goethe's time, it was generally acknowledged that, as Isaac Newton had shown in his Opticks in 1704, colourless (white) light is split up into its component colours when directed through a prism.

Along with the rest of the world I was convinced that all the colours are contained in the light; no one had ever told me anything different, and I had never found the least cause to doubt it, because I had no further interest in the subject.

But how I was astonished, as I looked at a white wall through the prism, that it stayed white! That only where it came upon some darkened area, it showed some colour, then at last, around the window sill all the colours shone... It didn't take long before I knew here was something significant about colour to be brought forth, and I spoke as through an instinct out loud, that the Newtonian teachings were false.

— Goethe

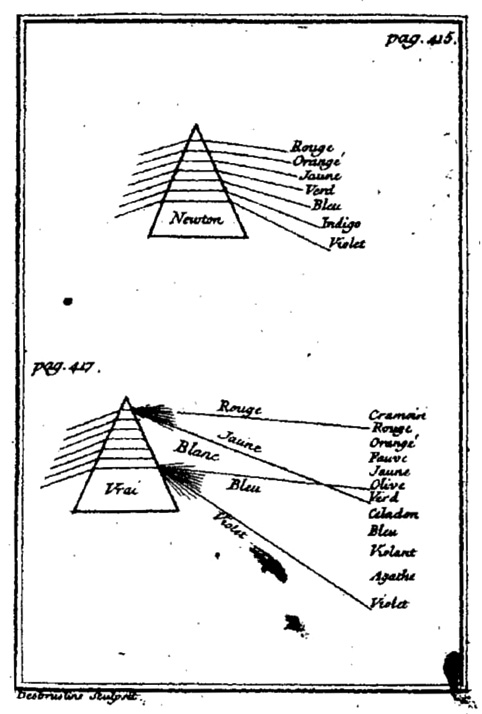
Castel's 1740 comparison of Newton's spectral colour description with his explanation in terms of the interaction of light and dark, which Goethe later developed into his Theory of Colours

This experience gave him the decisive impetus to develop his own theory of colour. and by 1793 Goethe had formulated his arguments against Newton in the essay "Über Newtons Hypothese der diversen Refrangibilität" ("On Newton's hypothesis of diverse refrangibility"). Yet, by 1794, Goethe had begun to increasingly note the importance of the physiological aspect of colours, "where it was even more difficult to distinguish between the objective and the subjective".

As Goethe notes in the historical section, Louis Bertrand Castel had already published a criticism of Newton's spectral description of prismatic colour in 1740 in which he observed that the sequence of colours split by a prism depended on the distance from the prism—and that Newton was looking at a special case.

"Whereas Newton observed the colour spectrum cast on a wall at a fixed distance away from the prism, Goethe observed the cast spectrum on a white card which was progressively moved away from the prism... As the card was moved away, the projected image elongated, gradually assuming an elliptical shape, and the coloured images became larger, finally merging at the centre to produce green. Moving the card farther led to the increase in the size of the image, until finally the spectrum described by Newton in the Opticks was produced... The image cast by the refracted beam was not fixed, but rather developed with increasing distance from the prism. Consequently, Goethe saw the particular distance chosen by Newton to prove the second proposition of the Opticks as capriciously imposed." (Alex Kentsis, Between Light and Eye)

The theory we set up against this begins with colourless light, and avails itself of outward conditions, to produce coloured phenomena; but it concedes worth and dignity to these conditions. It does not arrogate to itself developing colours from the light, but rather seeks to prove by numberless cases that colour is produced by light as well as by what stands against it.

— Goethe

Recently, experiments by physicist Matthias Rang have demonstrated Goethe's discovery of complementarity as a symmetric property of spectral phenomena. also a more recent reexamination of Newton's Experimentum Crucis has:

shown that the commonly accepted analysis contains assumptions in the choice of the spectrum and background, which mask the inherent dynamic of the spectrum.. that apply under specific conditions that have later become standardized in Spectroscopy, leading to a consensus regarding the relation of wavelength to colours of one particular spectrum.

== Goethe's theory ==
Goethe's theory of the constitution of colours of the spectrum has not proved to be an unsatisfactory theory, rather it really isn't a theory at all. Nothing can be predicted with it. It is, rather a vague schematic outline of the sort we find in James's psychology. Nor is there any experimentum crucis which could decide for or against the theory.

— Ludwig Wittgenstein, Remarks on Colour, paragraphs 70

It is hard to present Goethe's "theory", since he refrains from setting up any actual theory; he says, "its intention is to portray rather than explain" (Scientific Studies). Instead of setting up models and explanations, Goethe collected specimens—he was responsible for the meteorological collections of Jena University. By the time of his death, he had amassed over 17,800 minerals in his personal collection—the largest in all of Europe. He took the same approach to colour—instead of narrowing and isolating things to a single 'experimentum crucis' (or critical experiment that would prove or disprove his theory), he sought to gain as much breadth for his understanding as possible by developing a wide-ranging exposition through which is revealed the essential character of colour—without having to resort to explanations and theories about perceived phenomena such as 'wavelengths' or 'particles'.

"The crux of his color theory is its experiential source: rather than impose theoretical statements, Goethe sought to allow light and color to be displayed in an ordered series of experiments that readers could experience for themselves." (Seamon, 1998). According to Goethe, "Newton's error.. was trusting math over the sensations of his eye." (Jonah Lehrer, 2006).

To stay true to the perception without resort to explanation was the essence of Goethe's method. What he provided was really not so much a theory as a rational description of colour. For Goethe, "the highest is to understand that all fact is really theory. The blue of the sky reveals to us the basic law of color. Search nothing beyond the phenomena, they themselves are the theory."

[Goethe] delivered in full measure what was promised by the title of his excellent work: Data for a Theory of Color. They are important, complete, and significant data, rich material for a future theory of color. He has not, however, undertaken to furnish the theory itself; hence, as he himself remarks and admits on page xxxix of the introduction, he has not furnished us with a real explanation of the essential nature of color, but really postulates it as a phenomenon, and merely tells us how it originates, not what it is. The physiological colors ... he represents as a phenomenon, complete and existing by itself, without even attempting to show their relation to the physical colors, his principal theme. ... it is really a systematic presentation of facts, but it stops short at this.

— Schopenhauer, On Vision and Colors, Introduction

Goethe outlines his method in the essay, The experiment as mediator between subject and object (1772). It underscores his experiential standpoint. "The human being himself, to the extent that he makes sound use of his senses, is the most exact physical apparatus that can exist." (Goethe, Scientific Studies)

I believe that what Goethe was really seeking was not a physiological but a psychological theory of colours.

— Ludwig Wittgenstein, Culture and Value, MS 112 255:26.11.1931

Goethe's chromatic understanding is embedded in a paradigm of polarity. In the preface to the Theory of Colours, Goethe explains how he tried to apply this principle — which is constitutive of his earliest convictions and study of nature.

=== Light and darkness ===
Unlike his contemporaries, Goethe did not see darkness as an absence of light, but rather as polar to and interacting with light; colour resulted from this interaction of light and shadow. For Goethe, light is "the simplest most undivided most homogeneous being that we know. Confronting it is the darkness" (Letter to Jacobi).

...they maintained that shade is a part of light. It sounds absurd when I express it; but so it is: for they said that colours, which are shadow and the result of shade, are light itself.

— Johann Eckermann, Conversations of Goethe, entry: January 4, 1824; trans. Wallace Wood

Based on his experiments with turbid media, Goethe characterized colour as arising from the dynamic interplay of darkness and light. Rudolf Steiner, the science editor for the Kurschner edition of Goethe's works, gave the following analogy:

Modern natural science sees darkness as a complete nothingness. According to this view, the light which streams into a dark space has no resistance from the darkness to overcome. Goethe pictures to himself that light and darkness relate to each other like the north and south pole of a magnet. The darkness can weaken the light in its working power. Conversely, the light can limit the energy of the darkness. In both cases color arises.

— Rudolf Steiner, 1897

Goethe expresses this more succinctly:

[..] white that becomes darkened or dimmed inclines to yellow; black, as it becomes lighter, inclines to blue.

In other words: Yellow is a light which has been dampened by darkness; Blue is a darkness weakened by light.

=== Experiments with turbid media ===
The action of turbid media was to Goethe the ultimate fact—the Urphänomen—of the world of colours.

— John Tyndall, 1880

Goethe's studies of colour began with experiments which examined the effects of turbid media, such as air, dust, and moisture on the perception of light and dark. The poet observed that light seen through a turbid medium appears yellow, and darkness seen through an illuminated medium appears blue.

The highest degree of light, such as that of the sun... is for the most part colourless. This light, however, seen through a medium but very slightly thickened, appears to us yellow. If the density of such a medium be increased, or if its volume become greater, we shall see the light gradually assume a yellow-red hue, which at last deepens to a ruby colour. If on the other hand darkness is seen through a semi-transparent medium, which is itself illumined by a light striking on it, a blue colour appears: this becomes lighter and paler as the density of the medium is increased, but on the contrary appears darker and deeper the more transparent the medium becomes: in the least degree of dimness short of absolute transparence, always supposing a perfectly colourless medium, this deep blue approaches the most beautiful violet.

— Goethe, Theory of Colours, pp. 150–151

He then proceeds with numerous experiments, systematically observing the effects of rarefied mediums such as dust, air, and moisture on the perception of colour.

=== Boundary conditions ===
When looked at through a prism, the colours seen at a light–dark boundary depend upon the orientation of this light–dark boundary.

When viewed through a prism, the orientation of a light–dark boundary with respect to the prism's axis is significant. With white above a dark boundary, we observe the light extending a blue-violet edge into the dark area; whereas dark above a light boundary results in a red-yellow edge extending into the light area.

Goethe was intrigued by this difference. He felt that this arising of colour at light–dark boundaries was fundamental to the creation of the spectrum (which he considered to be a compound phenomenon).

Varying the experimental conditions by using different shades of grey shows that the intensity of coloured edges increases with boundary contrast.

=== Light and dark spectra ===
Light and dark spectra—when coloured edges overlap in a light spectrum, green results; when they overlap in a dark spectrum, magenta results. (Click for animation)

Since the colour phenomenon relies on the adjacency of light and dark, there are two ways to produce a spectrum: with a light beam in a dark room, and with a dark beam (i.e., a shadow) in a light room.

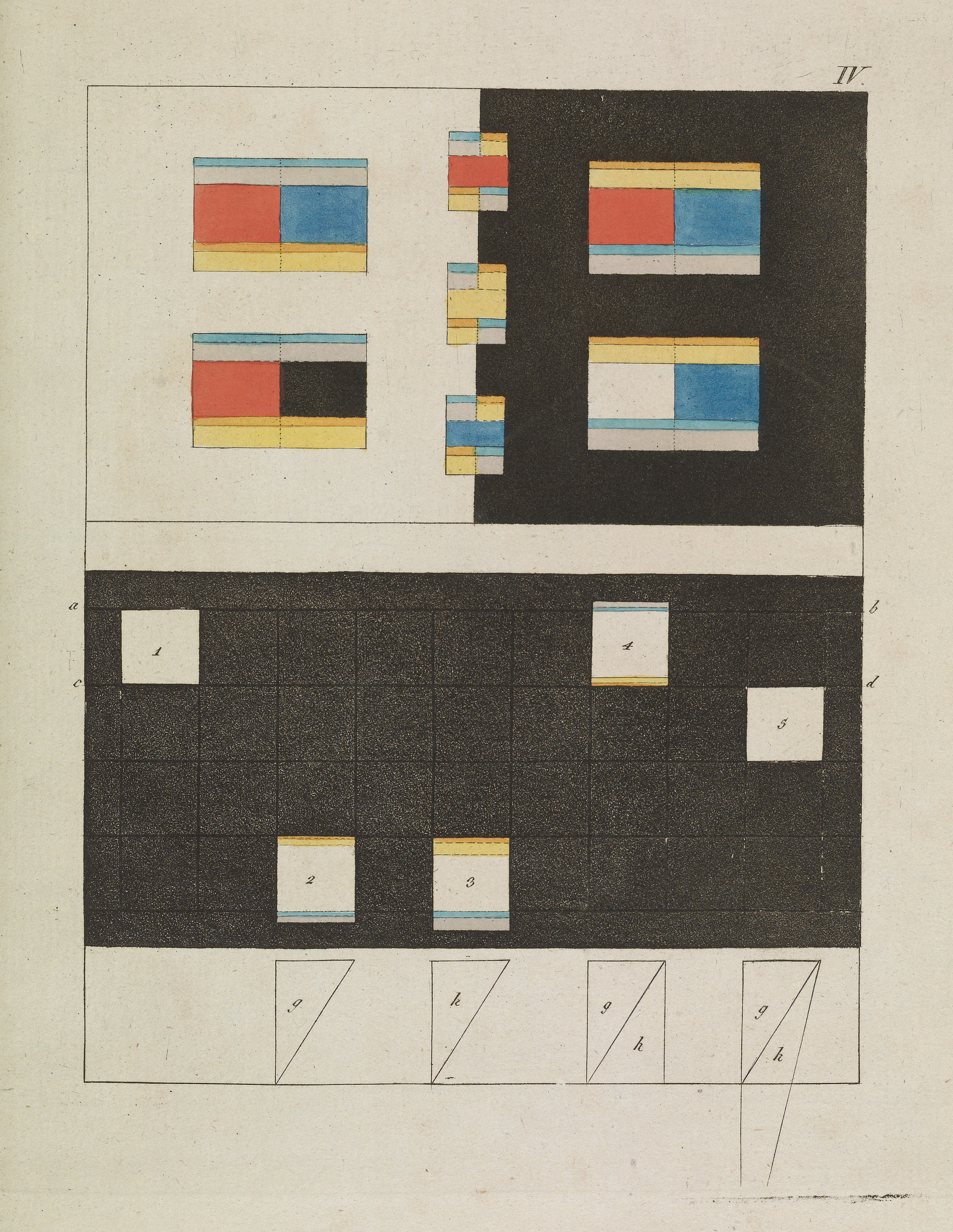
Plate IV, Theory of Colours.

Goethe recorded the sequence of colours projected at various distances from a prism for both cases (see Plate IV, Theory of Colours). In both cases, he found that the yellow and blue edges remain closest to the side which is light, and red and violet edges remain closest to the side which is dark. At a certain distance, these edges overlap—and we obtain Newton's spectrum. When these edges overlap in a light spectrum, green results; when they overlap in a dark spectrum, magenta results.

With a light spectrum (i.e. a shaft of light in a surrounding darkness), we find yellow-red colours along the top edge, and blue-violet colours along the bottom edge. The spectrum with green in the middle arises only where the blue-violet edges overlap the yellow-red edges. Unfortunately an optical mixture of blue and yellow gives white, not green, and so Goethe's explanation of Newton's spectrum fails.

Goethe also performed an exact reversal of Newton's experiment. By placing his prism in full sunlight, and placing a black cardboard circle in the middle the same size as Newton's hole — a dark spectrum (i.e., a shadow surrounded by light) is produced; we find there a violet-blue along the top edge, and red-yellow along the bottom edge—and where these edges overlap, we find (extraspectral) magenta.

Olaf Müller presented the matter in the following way, "According to Newton, all spectral colors are contained in white sunlight, according to Goethe, the opposite can be said — that all colors of the complementary spectrum are contained in the dark."

== Goethe's colour wheel ==
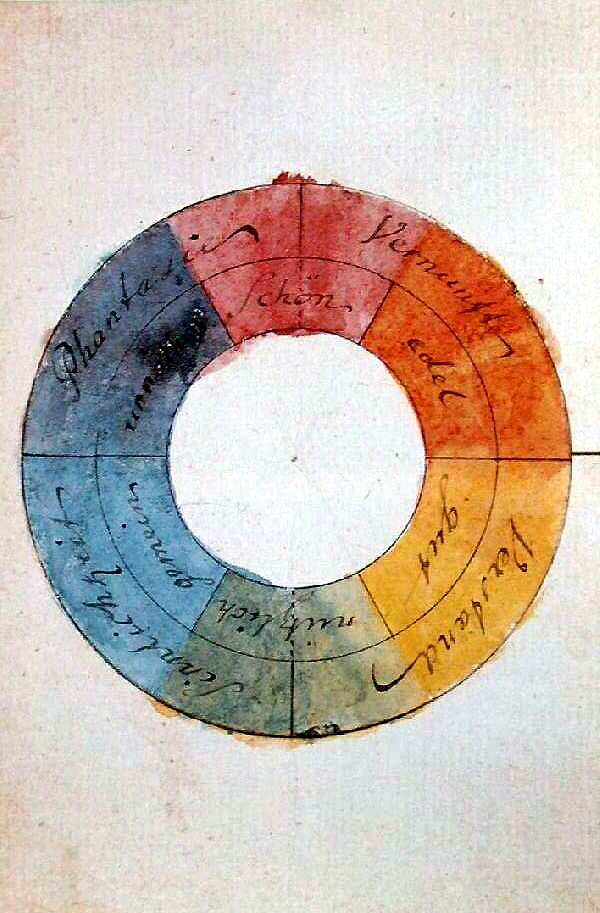
Goethe's symmetric colour wheel with associated symbolic qualities (1809)

When the eye sees a colour it is immediately excited and it is its nature, spontaneously and of necessity, at once to produce another, which with the original colour, comprehends the whole chromatic scale.

— Goethe, Theory of Colours

Goethe anticipated Ewald Hering's opponent process theory by proposing a symmetric colour wheel. He writes, "The chromatic circle... [is] arranged in a general way according to the natural order... for the colours diametrically opposed to each other in this diagram are those which reciprocally evoke each other in the eye. Thus, yellow demands violet; orange [demands] blue; purple [demands] green; and vice versa: thus... all intermediate gradations reciprocally evoke each other; the simpler colour demanding the compound, and vice versa ( paragraph #50).

In the same way that light and dark spectra yielded green from the mixture of blue and yellow—Goethe completed his colour wheel by recognising the importance of magenta—"For Newton, only spectral colors could count as fundamental. By contrast, Goethe's more empirical approach led him to recognize the essential role of magenta in a complete color circle, a role that it still has in all modern color systems."

=== Complementary colours and colours psychology ===
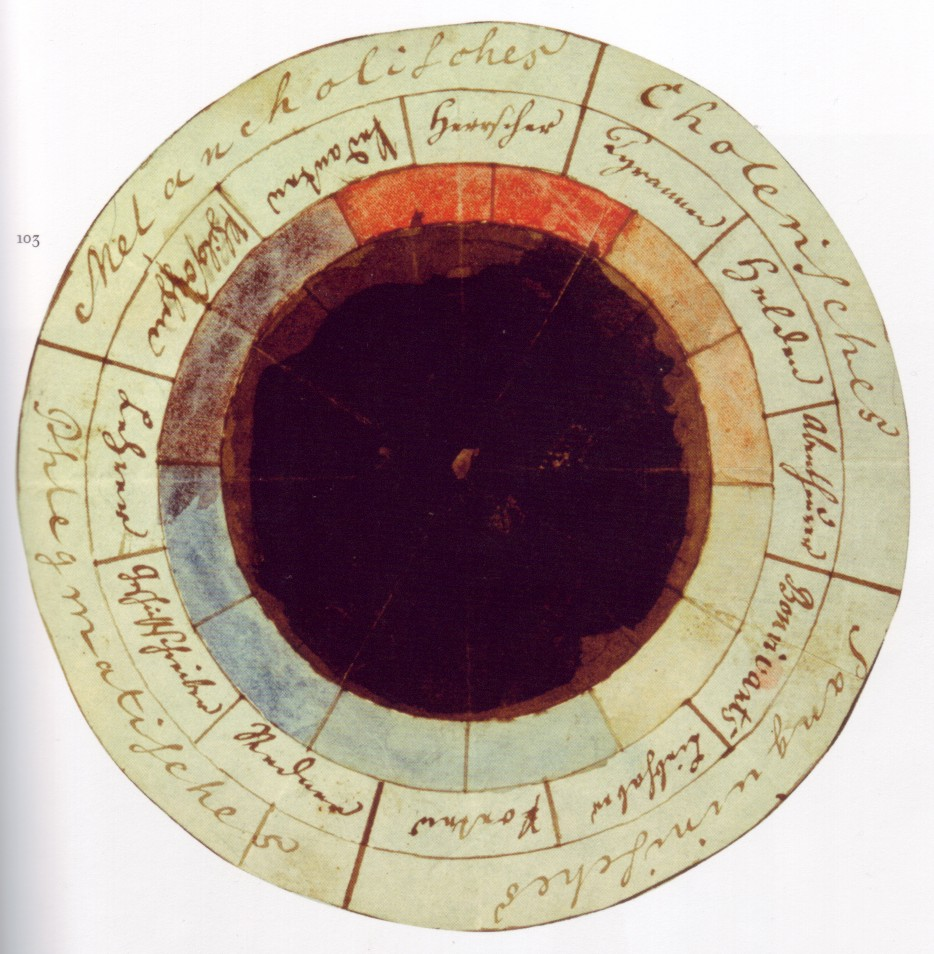
The "rose of temperaments" (Temperamentenrose), an earlier study (1798/9) by Goethe and Schiller, matching twelve colours to human occupations or their character traits (tyrants, heroes, adventurers, hedonists, lovers, poets, public speakers, historians, teachers, philosophers, pedants, rulers), grouped in the four temperaments.

Goethe also included aesthetic qualities in his colour wheel, under the title of "allegorical, symbolic, mystic use of colour" (Allegorischer, symbolischer, mystischer Gebrauch der Farbe), establishing a kind of color psychology. He associated red with the "beautiful", orange with the "noble", yellow to the "good", green to the "useful", blue to the "common", and violet to the "unnecessary". These six qualities were assigned to four categories of human cognition, the rational (Vernunft) to the beautiful and the noble (red and orange), the intellectual (Verstand) to the good and the useful (yellow and green), the sensual (Sinnlichkeit) to the useful and the common (green and blue) and, closing the circle, imagination (Phantasie) to both the unnecessary and the beautiful (purple and red).

==== Notes on translation ====
Magenta appeared as a colour term only in the mid-nineteenth century, after Goethe. Hence, references to Goethe's recognition of magenta are fraught with interpretation. If one observes the colours coming out of a prism—an English person may be more inclined to describe as magenta what in German is called Purpur—so one may not lose the intention of the author.

However, literal translation is more difficult. Goethe's work uses two composite words for mixed (intermediate) hues along with corresponding usual colour terms such as "orange" and "violet".

German	English	Symbolism
Purpur	Magenta (or purple) see below	Schön (beautiful)
Rot	Red	Schön (beautiful)
Gelbrot	Orange	Edel (noble)
Orange	Orange	Edel (noble)
Gelb	Yellow	Gut (good)
Grün	Green	Nützlich (useful)
Blau	Blue	Gemein (mean, common)
Violett	Violet	Unnötig (unnecessary)
Blaurot	Violet	Unnötig (unnecessary)

It is not clear how Goethe's Rot, Purpur (explicitly named as the complementary to green), and Schön (one of the six colour sectors) are related between themselves and to the red tip of the visible spectrum. The text about interference from the "physical" chapter does not consider Rot and Purpur synonymous. Also, Purpur is certainly distinct from Blaurot, because Purpur is named as a colour which lies somewhere between Blaurot and Gelbrot (, paragraph 476), although possibly not adjacent to the latter. This article uses the English translations from the above table.

== Newton and Goethe ==
Ernst Lehrs writes, "In point of fact, the essential difference between Goethe's theory of colour and the theory which has prevailed in science (despite all modifications) since Newton's day, lies in this: While the theory of Newton and his successors was based on excluding the colour-seeing faculty of the eye, Goethe founded his theory on the eye's experience of colour."

"The renouncing of life and immediacy, which was the premise for the progress of natural science since Newton, formed the real basis for the bitter struggle which Goethe waged against the physical optics of Newton. It would be superficial to dismiss this struggle as unimportant: there is much significance in one of the most outstanding men directing all his efforts to fighting against the development of Newtonian optics." (Werner Heisenberg, during a speech celebrating Goethe's birthday)

Due to their different approaches to a common subject, many misunderstandings have arisen between Newton's mathematical understanding of optics, and Goethe's experiential approach.

Because Newton understands white light to be composed of individual colours, and Goethe sees colour arising from the interaction of light and dark, they come to different conclusions on the question: is the optical spectrum a primary or a compound phenomenon?

For Newton, the prism is immaterial to the existence of colour, as all the colours already exist in white light, and the prism merely fans them out according to their refrangibility. Goethe sought to show that, as a turbid medium, the prism was an integral factor in the arising of colour.

Whereas Newton narrowed the beam of light in order to isolate the phenomenon, Goethe observed that with a wider aperture, there was no spectrum. He saw only reddish-yellow edges and blue-cyan edges with white between them, and the spectrum arose only where these edges came close enough to overlap. For him, the spectrum could be explained by the simpler phenomenon of colour arising from the interaction of light and dark edges.

Newton explains the appearance of white with colored edges by saying that due to the differing overall amount of refraction, the rays mix together to create a full white towards the centre, whereas the edges do not benefit from this full mixture and appear with greater red or blue components. For Newton's account of his experiments, see his Opticks (1704).

=== Table of differences ===
Qualities of light	Newton (1704)	Goethe (1810)
Homogeneity	White light is composed of coloured elements (heterogeneous).	Light is the simplest most undivided most homogenous thing (homogeneous).
Darkness	Darkness is the absence of light.	Darkness is polar to, and interacts with light.
Spectrum	Colours are fanned out of light according to their refrangibility (primary phenomenon).	Coloured edges which arise at light-dark borders overlap to form a spectrum (compound phenomenon).
Prism	The prism is immaterial to the existence of colour.	As a turbid medium, the prism plays a role in the arising of colour.
Role of refraction	Light becomes decomposed through refraction, inflection, and reflection.	Refraction, inflection, and reflection can exist without the appearance of colour.
Analysis	White light decomposes into a spectrum of all colors.	There are only two pure colours—blue and yellow; the rest are degrees of these. (Theory of Colours, Volume 3, Paragraph 201/202)
Synthesis	Just as white light can be decomposed, it can be put back together.	Colours recombine to shades of grey. (Theory of Colours, Volume 2, Paragraph 83)
Particle or wave?	Particle	Neither, since they are inferences and not observed with the senses.
Colour wheel	Asymmetric, 7 colours	Symmetric, 6 colours

Goethe's reification of darkness is rejected by modern physics. Both Newton and Huygens defined darkness as an absence of light. Young and Fresnel showed that Huygens' wave theory (in his Treatise on Light) could explain that colour is the visible manifestation of light's wavelength. Physicists today attribute both a corpuscular and undulatory character to light—comprising the wave–particle duality.

== History and influence ==
The first edition of the Farbenlehre was printed at the Cotta'schen Verlagsbuchhandlung on May 16, 1810, with 250 copies on grey paper and 500 copies on white paper. It contained three sections: i) a didactic section in which Goethe presents his own observations, ii) a polemic section in which he makes his case against Newton, and iii) a historical section.

From its publication, the book was controversial for its stance against Newton. So much so, that when Charles Eastlake translated the text into English in 1840, he omitted the content of Goethe's polemic against Newton.

Significantly (and regrettably), only the 'Didactic' colour observations appear in Eastlake's translation. In his preface, Eastlake explains that he deleted the historical and entoptic parts of the book because they 'lacked scientific interest', and censored Goethe's polemic because the 'violence of his objections' against Newton would prevent readers from fairly judging Goethe's color observations.

— Bruce MacEvoy, Handprint.com, 2008

=== Influence on the arts ===
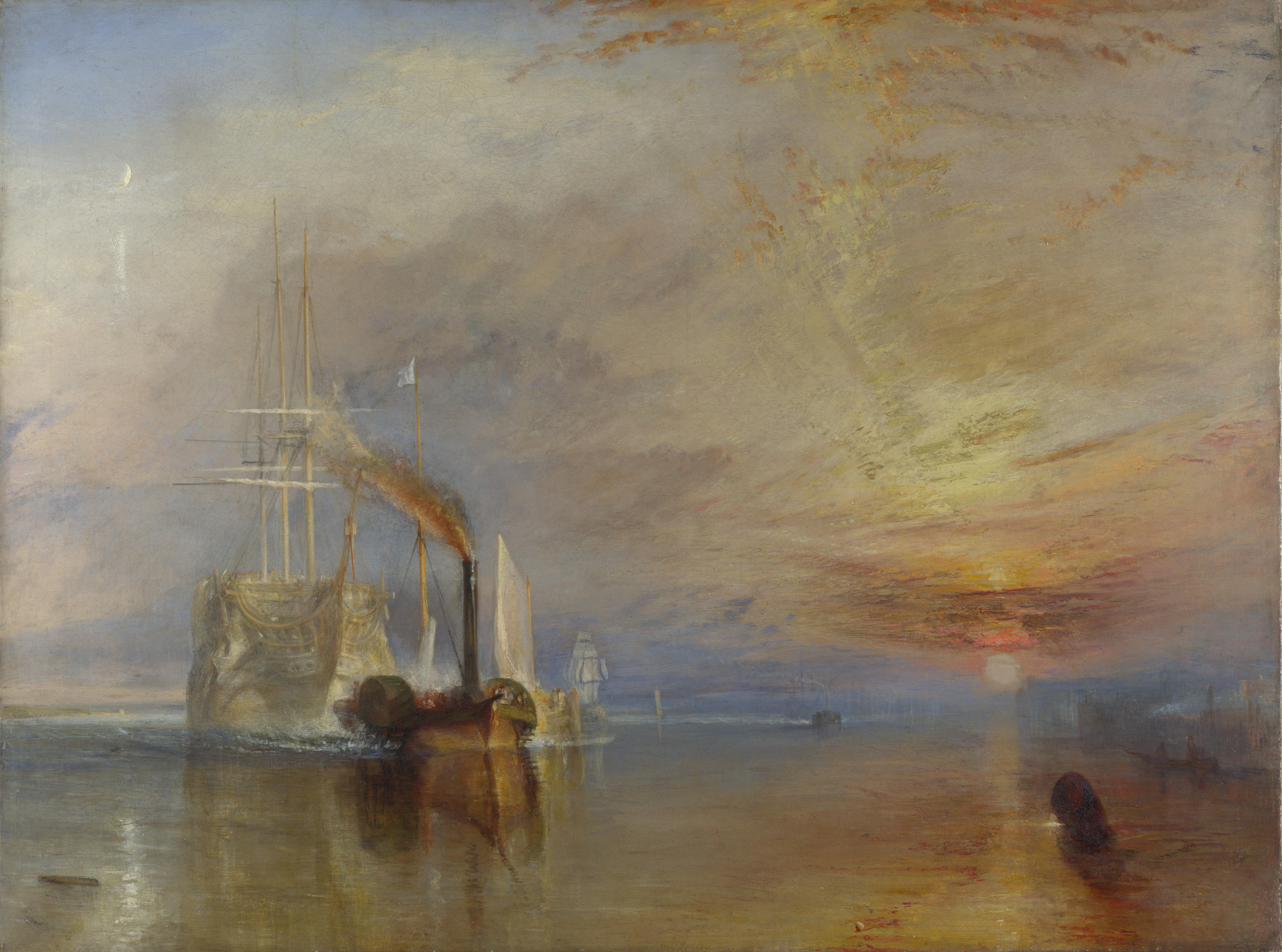
J. M. W. Turner's The Fighting Temeraire, 1839

Goethe was initially induced to occupy himself with the study of colour by the questions of hue in painting. "During his first journey to Italy (1786–88), he noticed that artists were able to enunciate rules for virtually all the elements of painting and drawing except color and coloring. In the years 1786–88, Goethe began investigating whether one could ascertain rules to govern the artistic use of color."

This aim came to some fulfillment when several pictorial artists, above all Philipp Otto Runge, took an interest in his colour studies. After being translated into English by Charles Eastlake in 1840, the theory became widely adopted by the art world—especially among the Pre-Raphaelites. J. M. W. Turner studied it comprehensively and referenced it in the titles of several paintings. Wassily Kandinsky considered it "one of the most important works."

=== Influence on Latin American flags ===
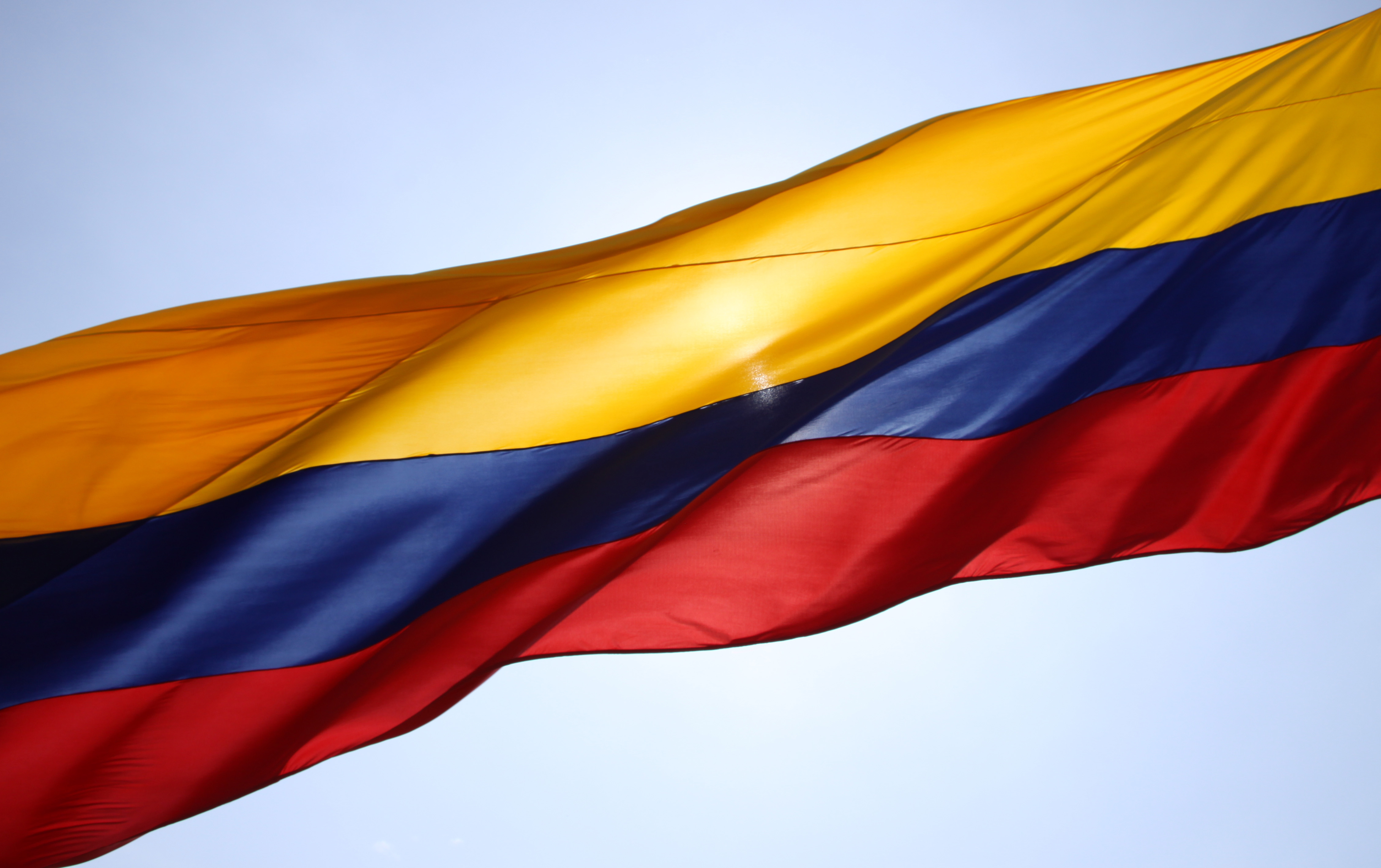
Flag of Colombia

During a party in Weimar in the winter of 1785, Goethe had a late-night conversation with the South American revolutionary Francisco de Miranda. In a letter written to Count Semyon Romanovich Vorontsov (1792), Miranda recounted how Goethe, fascinated with his exploits throughout the Americas and Europe, told him, "Your destiny is to create in your land a place where primary colours are not distorted." He proceeded to clarify what he meant:

First he explained to me the way the iris transforms the light into the three primary colours... then he said, "Why yellow is the most warm, noble and closest to the bright light; why Blue is that mix of excitement and serenity, so far that it evokes the shadows; and why Red is the exaltation of Yellow and Blue, the synthesis, the vanishing of the bright light into the shadows".

=== Influence on philosophers ===
In the nineteenth century Goethe's Theory was taken up by Schopenhauer in On Vision and Colors, who developed it into a kind of arithmetical physiology of the action of the retina, much in keeping with his own representative idealism ["The world is my representation or idea"].

In the twentieth century the theory was transmitted to philosophy via Ludwig Wittgenstein, who devoted a series of remarks to the subject at the end of his life. These remarks are collected as Remarks on Colour, (Wittgenstein, 1977).

Someone who agrees with Goethe finds that Goethe correctly recognized the nature of colour. And here ‘nature’ does not mean a sum of experiences with respect to colours, but it is to be found in the concept of colour.

— Aphorism 125, Ludwig Wittgenstein, Remarks on Color, 1992

Wittgenstein was interested in the fact that some propositions about colour are apparently neither empirical nor exactly a priori, but something in between: phenomenology, according to Goethe. However, Wittgenstein took the line that 'There is no such thing as phenomenology, though there are phenomenological problems.' He was content to regard Goethe's observations as a kind of logic or geometry. Wittgenstein took his examples from the Runge letter included in the "Farbenlehre", e.g. "White is the lightest colour", "There cannot be a transparent white", "There cannot be a reddish green", and so on. The logical status of these propositions in Wittgenstein's investigation, including their relation to physics, has been discussed in Jonathan Westphal's Colour: a Philosophical Introduction (Westphal, 1991).

=== Reception by scientists ===
During Goethe's lifetime (that is, between 1810 and 1832) countless scientists and mathematicians commented on Goethe's Newton criticism in color theory, namely in reviews, books, book chapters, footnotes, and open letters. Among these — just under half spoke against Goethe, especially Thomas Young, Étienne-Louis Malus, Pierre Prévost and Gustav Fechner. One third of the statements from the natural sciences were in favour of Goethe, in particular Thomas Johann Seebeck, Johann Schweigger and Johann Friedrich Christian Werneburg, and one-fifth expressed ambivalence or a draw.

As early as 1853, in Hermann von Helmholtz's lecture on Goethe's scientific works—he says of Goethe's work that he depicts the perceived phenomena—"circumstantially, rigorously true to nature, and vividly puts them in an order that is pleasant to survey, and proves himself here, as everywhere in the realm of the factual, to be the great master of exposition" (Helmholtz 1853). Helmholtz ultimately rejects Goethe's theory as the work of a poet, but expresses his perplexity at how they can be in such agreement about the facts of the matter, but in violent contradiction about their meaning—'And I for one do not know how anyone, regardless of what his views about colours are, can deny that the theory in itself is fully consequent, that its assumptions, once granted, explain the facts treated completely and indeed simply'. (Helmholtz 1853)

Although the accuracy of Goethe's observations does not admit a great deal of criticism, his aesthetic approach did not lend itself to the demands of analytic and mathematical analysis used ubiquitously in modern science.

Goethe's colour theory has in many ways borne fruit in art, physiology and aesthetics. But victory, and hence influence on the research of the following century, has been Newton's.

— Werner Heisenberg, 1952

"One hole Goethe did find in Newton's armour, through which he incessantly worried the Englishman with his lance. Newton had committed himself to the doctrine that refraction without colour was impossible. He therefore thought that the object-glasses of telescopes must for ever remain imperfect, achromatism and refraction being incompatible. This inference was proved by Dollond to be wrong... Here, as elsewhere, Goethe proves himself master of the experimental conditions. It is the power of interpretation that he lacks."

— John Tyndall, 1880

Much controversy stems from two different ways of investigating light and colour. Goethe was not interested in Newton's analytic treatment of colour—but he presented an excellent rational description of the phenomenon of human colour perception. It is as such a collection of colour observations that we must view this book.

Most of Goethe's explanations of color have been thoroughly demolished, but no criticism has been leveled at his reports of the facts to be observed; nor should any be. This book can lead the reader through a demonstration course not only in subjectively produced colors (after images, light and dark adaptation, irradiation, colored shadows, and pressure phosphenes), but also in physical phenomena detectable qualitatively by observation of color (absorption, scattering, refraction, diffraction, polarization, and interference). A reader who attempts to follow the logic of Goethe's explanations and who attempts to compare them with the currently accepted views might, even with the advantage of 1970 sophistication, become convinced that Goethe's theory, or at least a part of it, has been dismissed too quickly.

— Deane B. Judd, 1970

Mitchell Feigenbaum came to believe that "Goethe had been right about colour!"

As Feigenbaum understood them, Goethe's ideas had true science in them. They were hard and empirical. Over and over again, Goethe emphasized the repeatability of his experiments. It was the perception of colour, to Goethe, that was universal and objective. What scientific evidence was there for a definable real-world quality of redness independent of our perception?

— James Gleick, Chaos

=== Current status ===
"Newton believed that with the help of his prism experiments, he could prove that sunlight was composed of variously coloured rays of light. Goethe showed that this step from observation to theory is more problematic than Newton wanted to admit. By insisting that the step to theory is not forced upon us by the phenomena, Goethe revealed our own free, creative contribution to theory construction. And Goethe's insight is surprisingly significant, because he correctly claimed that all of the results of Newton's prism experiments fit a theoretical alternative equally well.. a century before Duhem and Quine's famous arguments for Underdetermination."

"Goethe's critique of Newton was not an attack on reason or science, though it has often been portrayed that way.. The critique maintained that Newton had mistaken mathematical imagining as the pure evidence of the senses.. Goethe tried to define the scientific function of imagination: to interrelate phenomena once they have been meticulously produced, described, and organized... Newton had introduced dogma.. into color science by claiming that color could be reduced to a function of rays." (Dennis L. Sepper, 2009)

Goethe started out by accepting Newton's physical theory. He soon abandoned it... finding modification to be more in keeping with his own insights. One beneficial consequence of this was that he developed an awareness of the importance of the physiological aspect of colour perception, and was therefore able to demonstrate that Newton's theory of light and colours is too simplistic; that there is more to colour than variable refrangibility.

— Michael Duck, 1988

"Although he soon rejected Newton's differential refrangibility, Goethe always affirmed Newtonian mechanics. It was not an apriori poetic prejudice against mathematical analysis but rather performing the experiments that led him to reject the theory... Goethe soon concluded that in order to explain color one needs to know not just about light but also about eye function and relative differences in light across the visual field." (Sepper, 2009)

As a catalogue of observations, Goethe's experiments probe the complexities of human colour perception. Whereas Newton sought to develop a mathematical model for the behaviour of light, Goethe focused on exploring how colour is perceived in a wide array of conditions. Developments in understanding how the brain interprets colours, such as colour constancy and Edwin H. Land's retinex theory bear striking similarities to Goethe's theory.

Goethe discovered that producing images by passing inverse optical contrasts through a prism always results in isomorphic, complementary spectra. Against the background of the representation he had found in Newton's Opticks, this was an unexpected discovery. Experimental developments by physicist Matthias Rang have demonstrated Goethe's discovery of complementarity as a symmetric property of spectral phenomena. A re-examination of Newton's experimentum crucis by scholar Gopi Krishna Vijaya in 2020 reports:

The polarity of light and dark in the treatment of the Newtonian spectrum and the inverse spectrum is studied.. in relation to Goethe’s views.. In order to clarify the reality of the 'Darkness Rays'. [Newton's] experimentum crucis is re-evaluated. It is shown that the commonly accepted analysis contains assumptions in the choice of the spectrum and background, which mask the inherent dynamic of the spectrum. The relation between colour and wavelength is re-examined with respect to the immutability and specific refrangibility of colour. It is then shown that both these properties are approximations that apply under the specific conditions that have later become standardized in Spectroscopy, leading to a consensus regarding the relation of wavelength to colours of one particular spectrum.

A modern treatment of the book is given by Dennis L. Sepper in the book, Goethe contra Newton: Polemics and the Project for a New Science of Color (Cambridge University Press, 2003).

== Quotations ==
As to what I have done as a poet... I take no pride in it... but that in my century I am the only person who knows the truth in the difficult science of colours—of that, I say, I am not a little proud, and here I have a consciousness of a superiority to many.

— Goethe, as recalled by Johann Eckermann, Conversations of Goethe, (tr. John Oxenford), London, 1930, p.302

[Goethe] delivered in full measure what was promised by the title of his excellent work: data toward a theory of colour. They are important, complete, and significant data, rich material for a future theory of colour. He has not, however, undertaken to furnish the theory itself; hence, as he himself remarks and admits on page xxxix of the introduction, he has not furnished us with a real explanation of the essential nature of colour, but really postulates it as a phenomenon, and merely tells us how it originates, not what it is.

— Schopenhauer, On Vision and Colors

Goethe's theory of the origin of the spectrum isn't a theory of its origin that has proved unsatisfactory; it is really not a theory at all. Nothing can be predicted by means of it. It is, rather, a vague schematic outline, of the sort we find in James's psychology. There is no experimentum crucis for Goethe's theory of colour.

— Wittgenstein, Remarks on Colour

Can you lend me the Theory of Colours for a few weeks? It is an important work. His last things are insipid.

— Ludwig van Beethoven, Conversation-book, 1820

=== On the catalytic moment ===
Aber wie verwundert war ich, als die durch's Prisma angeschaute weiße Wand nach wie vor weiß blieb, daß nur da, wo ein Dunkles dran stieß, sich eine mehr oder weniger entschiedene Farbe zeigte, daß zuletzt die Fensterstäbe am allerlebhaftesten farbig erschienen, indessen am lichtgrauen Himmel draußen keine Spur von Färbung zu sehen war. Es bedurfte keiner langen Überlegung, so erkannte ich, daß eine Gränze nothwendig sey, um Farben hervorzubringen, und ich sprach wie durch einen Instinct sogleich vor mich laut aus, daß die Newtonische Lehre falsch sey.

But I was astonished, as I looked at a white wall through the prism, how it stayed white! That only there where it came upon some darkened area, it showed more or less some colour, then at last, around the window bars all the colours shone, whereas in the light grey sky outside there was no colour to be seen. It didn't take long before I knew that a border was required for colour to be brought forth, and I spoke as through an instinct out loud, that the Newtonian teachings were false.

— Goethe, Goethes Werke, Weimar: Hermann Böhlau, 1887–1919, II. Abtheilung: Naturwissenschaftlichte Schriften, Bd. 4, pp. 295–296

== See also ==
- Checker shadow illusion (Same color illusion)
- Color theory
- Entoptic phenomenon
- Opponent process
- Romanticism in science
- Theory of painting

== Bibliography ==
- Goethe, Theory of Colours, trans. Charles Lock Eastlake, Cambridge, MA: MIT Press, 1982. ISBN 0-262-57021-1
- Bockemuhl, M., Turner. Koln: Taschen, 1991. ISBN 3-8228-6325-4.
- Duck, Michael J. (September 1988). "Newton and Goethe on colour: Physical and physiological considerations". Annals of Science. 45 (5): 507–519. doi:10.1080/00033798800200361.
- Gleick, James, Chaos, London: William Heinemann, 1988. pp. 165–7
- Lehrer, Jonah, Goethe and Color, Science Blogs: The Frontal Cortex, 7 Dec. 2006.
- Lehrs, Ernst, Man or Matter, Chapter XIV
- Matthaei, Rupprecht, Goethe's color theory. By Johann Wolfgang von Goethe. Arranged and edited by Rupprecht Matthaei. American ed. translated and edited by Herb Aach. Van Nostrand Reinhold, 1971.
- Proskauer, The Rediscovery of Color, Dornach: Steiner Books, 1986.
- Rowe, M. W. (July 1991). "Goethe and Wittgenstein". Philosophy. 66 (257): 283–303. doi:10.1017/S0031819100064901. JSTOR 3751682.
- Ribe, Neil; Steinle, Friedrich (2002). "Exploratory Experimentation: Goethe, Land, and Color Theory". Physics Today. 55 (7): 43. Bibcode:2002PhT....55g..43R. doi:10.1063/1.1506750.
- Ribe, Neil M (1985). "Goethe's critique of Newton: A reconsideration". Studies in History and Philosophy of Science Part A. 16 (4): 315–335. Bibcode:1985SHPSA..16..315R. doi:10.1016/0039-3681(85)90015-9.
- Schopenhauer, On Vision and Colors, Providence: Berg, 1994. ISBN 0-85496-988-8
- Sepper, Dennis L., Goethe contra Newton: Polemics and the Project for a New Science of Color, Cambridge: Cambridge University Press, 2007. ISBN 0-521-53132-2
- Sepper, Dennis L. (September 2009). "Goethe, Newton, and the Imagination of Modern Science". Revue internationale de philosophie. 249 (3): 261–277. doi:10.3917/rip.249.0261.
- Steiner, Rudolf, First Scientific Lecture-Course, Third Lecture, Stuttgart, 25 December 1919. GA320.
- Steiner, Rudolf, "Goethe's World View", Chapter III The Phenomena of the World of Colors, 1897.
- Barsan, Victor; Merticariu, Andrei (2016). "Goethe's theory of colors between the ancient philosophy, middle ages occultism and modern science" (PDF). Cogent Arts & Humanities. 3. doi:10.1080/23311983.2016.1145569.
- Westphal, Jonathan, "Colour: a Philosophical Introduction", Aristotelian Society Series, Vol. 7, Oxford, Blackwell, 1991 (2nd. ed.).
- Wittgenstein, Remarks on Colour, Berkeley: University of California Press, 1978. ISBN 0-520-03727-8
