= On Vision and Colours =

1816 treatise by Arthur Schopenhauer

On Vision and Colors (originally translated as On Vision and Colours; German: Ueber das Sehn und die Farben) is a treatise by Arthur Schopenhauer that was published in May 1816 when the author was 28 years old. Schopenhauer had extensive discussions with Johann Wolfgang von Goethe about the poet's Theory of Colours of 1810, in the months around the turn of the years 1813 and 1814, and initially shared Goethe's views. Their growing theoretical disagreements and Schopenhauer's criticisms made Goethe distance himself from his young collaborator. Although Schopenhauer considered his own theory superior, he would still continue to praise Goethe's work as an important introduction to his own.

Schopenhauer tried to demonstrate physiologically that color is "specially modified activity of the retina." The initial basis for Schopenhauer's color theory comes from Goethe's chapter on physiological colors, which discusses three principal pairs of contrasting colors: red/green, orange/blue, and yellow/violet. This is in contrast to the customary emphasis on Newton's seven colors of the Newtonian spectrum. In accordance with Aristotle, Schopenhauer considered that colors arise by the mixture of shadowy, cloudy darkness with light. With white and black at each extreme of the scale, colors are arranged in a series according to the mathematical ratio between the proportions of light and darkness. Schopenhauer agreed with Goethe's claim that the eye tends toward a sum total that consists of a color plus its spectrum or afterimage. Schopenhauer arranged the colors so that the sum of any color and its complementary afterimage always equals unity. The complete activity of the retina produces white. When the activity of the retina is divided, the part of the retinal activity that is inactive and not stimulated into color can be seen as the ghostly complementary afterimage, which he and Goethe call a (physiological) spectrum.

== History ==
Schopenhauer met Goethe in 1808 at his mother's parties in Weimar but Goethe then mostly ignored the young and unknown student. In November 1813, Goethe congratulated Schopenhauer on his doctoral dissertation On the Fourfold Root of the Principle of Sufficient Reason which he received as a gift. Both men shared the opinion that visual representations yielded more knowledge than did concepts. In the winter of 1813/1814, Goethe personally demonstrated his color experiments to Schopenhauer and they discussed color theory. Goethe encouraged Schopenhauer to write On Vision and Colors. Schopenhauer wrote it in a few weeks while living in Dresden in 1815. After it was published, in July 1815, Goethe rejected several of Schopenhauer's conclusions, especially as to whether white is a mixture of colors. He was also disappointed that Schopenhauer considered the whole topic of color to be a minor issue. Schopenhauer wrote as though Goethe had merely gathered data while Schopenhauer provided the actual theory. A major difference between the two men was that Goethe considered color to be an objective property of light and darkness. Schopenhauer's Kantian transcendental idealism was opposed to Goethe's realism. For Schopenhauer, color was subjective in that it exists totally in the spectator's retina. As such, it can be excited in various ways by external stimuli or internal bodily conditions. Light is only one kind of color stimulus.

In 1830, Schopenhauer published a revision of his color theory. The title was Theoria colorum Physiologica, eademque primaria (Fundamental physiological theory of color). It appeared in Justus Radius's Scriptores ophthalmologici minores (Minor ophthalmological writings). "This is no mere translation of the first edition," he wrote, "but differs noticeably from it in form and presentation and is also amply enriched in subject matter." Because it was written in Latin, he believed that foreign readers would be able to appreciate its value.

An improved second edition of On Vision and Colors was published in 1854. In 1870, a third edition was published, edited by Julius Frauenstädt. In 1942, an English translation by Lt. Col. E. F. J. Payne was published in Karachi, India. This translation was republished in 1994 by Berg Publishers, Inc., edited by Professor David E. Cartwright.

== Content ==
=== Preface to the second edition (the first edition had no Preface) ===
Although this work is mainly concerned with physiology, it is of philosophical value. In gaining knowledge of the subjective nature of color, the reader will have a more profound understanding of Kant's doctrine of the a priori, subjective, intellectual forms of all knowledge. This is in opposition to contemporary realism which simply takes objective experience as positively given. Realism doesn't consider that it is through the subjective that the objective exists. The observer's brain stands like a wall between the observing subject and the real nature of things.

=== Introduction ===
Goethe performed two services: (1) he freed color theory from its reliance on Newton, and (2) he provided a systematic presentation of data for a theory of color.

Before discussing color, there are some preliminary remarks to be made regarding vision. In § 1, it is shown that the perception of externally perceived objects in space is a product of the intellect's understanding after it has been stimulated by sensation from the sense organs. These remarks are necessary in order for the reader to be convinced that colors are entirely in the eye alone and are thoroughly subjective

=== Chapter 1—On Vision ===
==== § 1 ====
Intuitive perception, or knowledge of an object, is intellectual, not merely sensual. The intellect's understanding regards every sense impression in the observer's body as coming from an external cause. This transition from effect to cause is knowledge of the pure understanding, not a rational conclusion or combination of concepts and judgments according to logical laws. Knowledge of an object never results from mere impression, but always from the application of the law of causality, and consequently of the understanding. The law of causality is the sole form of the understanding and the precondition of the possibility of any objective perception.

Illusion occurs when the understanding is given uncommon sensations. If the sensations become commonplace, the illusion may disappear.

Intellectual understanding, or knowing the objective cause of a subjective sensation, distinguishes animals from plants. All animals are able to intuitively perceive objects.

Color is usually attributed to external bodies. However, color is actually the activity of the eye's retina. It is a sensation. The external body is perceived as the cause of the sensation of color. We say, "The body is red." In reality, though, color exists only in the retina of the eye. It is separate from the external object. Color is a mere sensation in the sense organ. The external object is perceived by the intellect's understanding as being the cause of sensations.

=== Chapter 2—On Colors ===
==== § 2 ====
Newton, Goethe, and all other color theorists began by investigating light and colored bodies in order to find the cause of color. They should have started with an investigation of the effect, the given phenomenon, the changes in the eye, we can afterward investigate the external physical and chemical causes of those sensations.

The eye's reaction to external stimulus is an activity, not a passive response. It is the activity of the retina. When the eye's retina receives a full impression of light, or when whiteness appears, it is fully active. When light is absent, or when blackness appears, the retina is inactive.

==== § 3 ====
There are gradations to the intensity or strength of the retina's activity, or reaction to external stimulus. The undivided activity of the retina is divided into stronger or weaker degrees when stimulated by pure light or whiteness. When influenced by light, the degrees are: Light — Half Shade — Darkness. When influenced by whiteness, the degrees are: White — Gray — Black. In this way, grays are seen. The intensity or energy of the retina's activity increases as more light or whiteness stimulates the eye. These gradations are made possible by the quantitative intensive divisibility of the retina's activity.

==== § 4 ====
The activity of the retina also has a quantitative extensive divisibility. The whole extent of the retina is divided into countless small juxtaposed spots or points. Each point is individually stimulated by light or whiteness and reacts separately. The eye can receive many impressions at one time, and therefore side by side.

==== § 5 ====
The qualitative division of the activity is completely different from the two quantitative divisions. It occurs when color is presented to the eye. Schopenhauer described the way in which various points or places on the retina become fatigued from being overstimulated. After staring at a black figure on a white background, the overactive and excited retinal points become exhausted and do not react to stimulation when the eye finally looks away. A ghostly appearance of a black background is seen with a light-colored figure. The retinal positions that were exhausted by the whiteness become completely inactive. The retinal positions that had been rested are now easily stimulated. This explains afterimage (physiological spectra). Both Goethe and Schopenhauer use the word "spectrum" [Spektrum], from the Latin word "spectrum" meaning "appearance" or "apparition," to designate an afterimage.

If, instead of white, we stare at yellow, then the afterimage, or physiological color spectrum, is violet. Yellow, unlike white, does not fully stimulate and exhaust the retina's activity. Yellow partially stimulates points on the retina and leaves those points partially unstimulated. The retina's activity has been qualitatively divided and separated into two parts. The unstimulated part results in a violet afterimage. Yellow and violet are the complement of each other because together they add up to full retinal activity. Yellow is closer to white, so it activates the retina more than violet, which is closer to black.

An orange color is not as close to white. It doesn't activate the retina as much as yellow. Orange's complement is blue, which is that much closer to white than was violet. A red color is halfway between white and black. Red's complement is green which is also halfway between white and black. With red and green, the retina's qualitatively divided activity consists of two equal halves.

Red and green are two completely equal qualitative halves of the retina's activity. Orange is 2/3 of this activity, and its complement, blue, is only 1/3. Yellow is ¾ of the full activity, and its complement, violet, is only ¼.

The range of all colors contains a continuous series of innumerable shades that blend into each other. Why are red, green, orange, blue, yellow, and violet given names and considered to be the most important? Because they represent the retina's activity in the simplest fractions or ratios. The same is true of the seven keynotes in the musical diatonic scale: do, re, mi, fa, sol, la, ti. Color is the qualitatively divided activity of the retina. The retina has a natural tendency to display its activity entirely. After the retina has been partly stimulated, its remaining complement is active as the physiological spectrum or afterimage. In this way, the retina is fully and wholly active.

Knowledge of these six colors is inborn in the mind. They are ideal and are never found pure in nature, in the same way that regular geometrical figures are innate. We have them a priori in our minds as standards to which we compare actual colors. These three pairs of colors are pure, subjective Epicurean anticipations because they are expressed in simple, rational, arithmetical ratios similar to the seven tones of the musical scale and their rational vibration numbers.

Black and white are not colors because they are not fractions and represent no qualitative division of the retina's activity. Colors appear in pairs as the union of a color and its complement. Newton's division into seven colors is absurd because the sum of all basic colors cannot be an odd number.

==== § 6 ====
The qualitatively divided activity of the retina is a polarity, like electricity and magnetism. The retina's polarity is successive, in time, whereas the polarity of the others is simultaneous, in space. The retina's activity, like Yin and Yang, is split into two parts which condition each other and seek to reunite. Red, orange, and yellow could be conventionally designated by a plus sign. Green, blue, and violet could be the negative poles.

==== § 7 ====
According to Goethe, color is like shade or gray in that it is darker than white and brighter than black. The difference between grays and colors, though, is as follows. Light is activity of the retina. Darkness is retinal inactivity. Grays appear when the intensity or strength of the retina's activity is lessened. Colors appear when the whole activity of the retina is divided into partial complementary poles according to ratios. With the merely quantitative, intensive division of the retina's activity, there is only a gradual (by degrees) diminution of the intensity or strength of the retina's full activity. No fractional division of activity in ratios occurs. This lessening of strength by small degrees results in gray shades. However, with the qualitative fractional division of the activity of the retina, the activity of the part that appears as color is necessarily conditioned by the inactivity of the complementary fractional part. The polar contrast between the active and inactive parts results in color. The vivid partial activity of the stimulated retinal spot is supported by that same spot's partial inactivity. Every color's darkness appears as its afterimage, or spectrum. Conversely, when looking at an afterimage, or physiological spectrum, the previously existing color is the darkening factor.

==== § 8 ====
Newton recognized that color is darker than white or light. He erroneously investigated light instead of the eye, the objective instead of the subjective. In so doing, he asserted that light rays are composed of seven colored rays. These seven were like the seven intervals of the musical scale. Schopenhauer claimed that there are only four prismatic colors: violet, blue, yellow, and orange. The rays described by Newton are supposed to be variously colored according to laws that have nothing to do with the eye. Instead of Newton's division of sunshine into seven rays, Schopenhauer claimed that color was a division of the eye's retina into two complementary parts. Like the Delphic Oracle, Copernicus, and Kant, Schopenhauer concentrated on the subjective rather than the objective, on the observer's experience rather than the observed object. In general, he believed, the subjective viewpoint leads to correct results.

Colors are not in light. Colors are nothing more than the eye's activity, appearing in polar contrasts. Philosophers have always surmised that color belongs to the eye rather than to things. Locke, for example, claimed that color was at the head of his list of secondary qualities.

Newton's theory has color as an occult quality. Schopenhauer's theory claims to be more explanatory. He said that each color is a definite + or − side of the division of the retina's activity, expressed as a fraction that reflects the color's sensation.

==== § 9 ====
When the entire activity of the eye is completely qualitatively partitioned, the color and its spectrum (afterimage) appear with maximum energy as being vivid, bright, dazzling, and brilliant. If the division is not total, however, part of the retina can remain undivided. A union of the quantitative intensive division with the qualitative division of the retina occurs. If the remainder is active, then the color and its spectrum are lost as they fade into white. If the remainder is inactive, then the color and its spectrum are lost as they darken into black. If the remainder is only partially inactive, then the color loses its energy by mixing with gray.

==== § 10 ====
If the activity of the retina is divided without a remainder, or if the remainder is active, then a color and its spectrum (afterimage) are bright or pale. When such a color and its spectrum are united, then the eye sees pure light or white. For example, the mixture of bright or pale red and green on the same retinal spot results in the impression there of light or white. White cannot be produced by mixing colored pigments. With colors from a prism, however, the production of white can be demonstrated by using a mixture of colored light from each of the three main pairs of complementary colors: red – green, orange – blue, or yellow – violet. White can be produced from two complementary opposite colors when both of the external causes of the colors excite the same retinal place at the same time. Newton claimed that white could be produced by the aggregation of his seven prismatic colors. He erroneously considered color to be in light instead of in the eye. White is the result of the combination of two opposite colors because their inactivity, or darkness, is removed when the two active parts of the retina combine.

According to Newton, refracted light must appear colored. With the achromatic refractor, however, this is not the case. Newtonians explain this by saying that the achromatic refractor's crown glass and flint glass refract light as a whole with equal intensity but disperse individual colors differently. According to Schopenhauer, achromatism results when refraction occurs in one direction in the concave lens and in another direction in the convex lens. A blue band then overlaps an orange band while a violet edge covers the yellow. The qualitatively divided retina (color) is thus reunited in full activity, resulting in achromatism (the absence of color).

If an observer looks through a prism at a white disk on a black background, two subsidiary images are seen. This is due to double refraction as the light bends twice, when entering and leaving the prism. With this double refraction, the two subsidiary images appear as one above and one below the main image. The distance of the two subsidiary images from the main image corresponds to the Newtonians' dispersion. The wideness or narrowness of the colored bands are, however, nonessential properties that differ according to the type of light-refracting substance that is used. The top of the upper image is violet. Below the violet is blue. The bottom of the lower image is orange. Above the orange is yellow. In this way, along with the white disk and the black background, four prismatic colors appear: violet, blue, yellow, and orange. This is in disagreement with Newton's claim that there are seven prismatic colors. As the upper image overlaps black, it is seen as violet. Where it overlaps white, it is seen as blue. As the lower image overlaps black, it is seen as orange. Where it overlaps white, it is seen as yellow. This shows how colors are produced when the image mixes with either lightness or darkness, in accordance with Goethe's assertions.

==== § 11 ====
In the operation of a healthy eye, three kinds of division of retinal activity often occur at once. (1) The quantitative intensive division unites with the qualitative division resulting in a loss of color energy and a deviation toward paleness or darkness; (2) After being excited by an external stimulant, the quantitative extensive division unites with the qualitative division resulting in the retina being covered by many various juxtaposed spots of color sensation; (3) When the stimulation ceases, an afterimage (physiological spectrum) appears on each retinal spot.

==== § 12 ====
Afterimages (spectra) appear after a mechanical shock to the eye. The eye's activity is convulsively divided. Transitory pathological spectra appear from glare or dazzle. The retina's activity is disorganized from over-stimulation. A dazzled eye sees red when looking at brightness and green when looking into darkness. The retina's activity is forcefully divided by the powerful stimulation. When the eye strains to see in dim light, the retina is voluntarily activated and intensively divided. Blue eyeglasses counter the effect of orange candlelight and produce the effect of daylight. An additional proof of the subjective nature of color, namely that it is a function of the eye itself and is only secondarily related to external objects, is given by the daguerreotype. It objectively shows that color is not essential to the appearance of an object. Also, people who are color blind would see color if it was in the object and not in the eye.

==== § 13 ====
Colors and the laws by which they appear reside within the eye. The external cause of color is a stimulus which excites the retina and separates its polarity. Goethe had organized color into three classes: physiological, physical, and chemical. He proposed that the external causes of color are physical colors and chemical colors.

===== Physical colors =====
Physical colors are temporary. They exist when light combines with cloudy transparent or translucent media, such as smoke, fog, or a glass prism. They are comprehensible because we know that they result from part of the qualitative division of retinal activity. Light is the external physical stimulus of the retina's activity. The more that we know about the effect (color as physiological fact), the more we can know a priori about its external cause. (1) The external stimulus can only excite color, which is the retina's polar division. (2) There are no individual colors. Colors come in pairs because each color is the qualitative part of the retina's full activity. The remaining part is the color's complementary color. (3) There are an infinite number of colors. Three pairs are distinguished by names of their own, however, because the retina's activity is bipartitioned in a rational proportion that consists of simple numbers. (4) A color's external cause, acting as a stimulus, must be capable of being changed and infinitely modified as much as the retina's activity can be infinitely divided qualitatively. (5) In the eye, color is a cloudy shade of white. This shadiness is the retina's resting part while the other retinal part is active. Newton's theory asserts that each prismatic color is 1/7 of the whole of light. If an infinite number, instead of seven, of light rays is assumed, then each color would be an infinitely small fraction of the whole of light. Schopenhauer's theory, however, claims that yellow is ¾ as bright as white. Orange is 2/3, red is ½, green is ½, blue is 1/3, and violet is ¼ as bright as white. The external cause of color is a diminished light that imparts just as much light to the color as it imparts darkness to the color's complement. Unlike Goethe, for Schopenhauer the primary phenomenon, or limit of explanation, is not an external cause, but the "organic capacity of the retina to let its nervous activity appear in two qualitatively opposite halves, sometimes equal, sometimes unequal...."

===== Chemical colors =====
Chemical colors are more durable properties of an external object, such as the red color of an apple. A chemical color is incomprehensible because we don't know its cause. Its appearance is only known from experience and it is not an essential part of the object. Chemical colors result from changes in an object's surface. A slight change in the surface may result in a different color. Color, therefore, is not an essential property of an object. This confirms the subjective nature of color.

==== § 14 ====
Schopenhauer said that he didn't have to worry about his discoveries being attributed to previous thinkers. "For, prior to 1816, never at any time did it occur to anyone to regard color ... as the halved activity of the retina, and accordingly to assign to each individual color its definite numerical fraction — a fraction that, with another color, goes to make up unity, this unity representing white or the full activity of the retina." Schopenhauer criticized scientists for thinking that color exists in external objects, instead of in the spectator's eye. Color as vibrations of an ether was rejected by him. Fraunhofer lines, according to Schopenhauer, do not exist in light itself. They result from the edges of the slit that light passes through.

== Letter to Eastlake ==
In 1841, Schopenhauer wrote a letter in English to Charles Lock Eastlake whose English translation of Goethe's book on colors had recently been reviewed in several journals. Schopenhauer included a copy of his On Vision and Colors with the letter. He briefly communicated the main point of his book as follows:

...if, bearing in mind the numerical fractions, (of the activity of the Retina) by which I express the 6 chief colours, You contemplate these colours singly, then You will find that only by this, and by no other theory on earth, You will come to understand the peculiar sensation, which every colour produces in your eye, and thereby get an insight into the very essence of every colour, and of colour in general. Likewise my theory alone gives the true sense in which the notion of complementary colours is to be taken, viz: as having no reference to light, but to the Retina, and not being a redintegration [restoration] of white light, but of the full action of the Retina, which by every colour undergoes a bipartition either in yellow (3/4) and violet (1/4) or in orange (2/3) and blue (1/3) or in red (1/2) and green (1/2). This is in short the great mystery.

Here he explained that color results from the way that the retina reacts to sensation. The cause may be light or other pressure on the retina. The fractions of two complementary colors sum to unity. White is undivided, whole retinal activity.

== Reception ==
Ludwig Wittgenstein and Erwin Schrödinger were strongly influenced by Schopenhauer's works and both seriously investigated color theory. Philipp Mainländer considered the work to be among the most important things ever written. Johannes Itten based his work on Schopenhauer's theory of color.

The mathematician Brouwer wrote: "Newton's theory of color analyzed light rays in their medium, but Goethe and Schopenhauer, more sensitive to the truth, considered color to be the polar splitting by the human eye."

The physicist Ernst Mach praised that "men such as Goethe, Schopenhauer" had started to "investigate the sensations themselves" on the first page of his work Die Analyse der Empfindungen und das Verhältnis des Physischen zum Psychischen.

According to Rudolf Arnheim, Schopenhauer's "...basic conception of complementary pairs in retinal functioning strikingly anticipates the color theory of Ewald Hering." Nietzsche noted that the Bohemian physiologist, Professor Czermak, acknowledged Schopenhauer's relation to the Young-Helmholtz theory of color. Bosanquet claimed that Schopenhauer's color theory was in accord with scientific research.

== Bibliography ==
- Goethe, Johann Wolfgang von, Theory of Colours, Translated by Charles Lock Eastlake, M.I.T Press, 1970, ISBN 0-262-57021-1
- Itten, Johannes, and Birren, Faber (1970). The Elements of Color: A Treatise on the Color System of Johannes Itten Based on His Book The Art of Color. New York: Van Nostrand Reinhold. ISBN 0-442-24038-4
- Safranski, Rüdiger (1990) Schopenhauer and the Wild Years of Philosophy. Harvard University Press, ISBN 0-674-79275-0
- Schopenhauer, Arthur, Gesammelte Briefe [Collected Letters], Bonn: Bouvier Verlag Herbert Grundmann, 1987. ISBN 3-416-01901-6
- Schopenhauer, Arthur, On Vision and Colors, Translated by E. F. J. Payne, Edited with an Introduction by David E. Cartwright, Berg Publishers, Inc., 1994, ISBN 0-85496-988-8
- Schopenhauer, Arthur, Parerga and Paralipomena, Volume II, Clarendon Press, 1974, ISBN 0-19-924221-6.
- Van Nostrand's Scientific Encyclopedia, Van Nostrand Reinhold Co. ISBN 0-442-25161-0
