= Remarks on Colour =

1950 book by Ludwig Wittgenstein

Remarks on Colour (German: Bemerkungen über die Farben) was one of Ludwig Wittgenstein's last works, written in Oxford in 1950, the year before he died.

== Overview ==
Believing that philosophical puzzles about colour can only be resolved through attention to the language games involved, Wittgenstein considers Goethe's propositions in the Theory of Colours, and the observations of Philipp Otto Runge in an attempt to clarify the use of language about colour. He also considers numerous examples of what we find ourselves unable not to agree to and to say about colours, for example that green is not a blend of blue and yellow. Here there seems to be an element of phenomenology involved in some way. However,

Goethe's theory of the constitution of colours of the spectrum has not proved to be an unsatisfactory theory, rather it really isn't a theory at all. Nothing can be predicted with it. It is, rather a vague schematic outline of the sort we find in William James's psychology. Nor is there any experimentum crucis which could decide for or against the theory. Someone who agrees with Goethe believes that Goethe correctly recognized the nature of colour. And nature here is not what results from experiments, but it lies in the concept of colour.

Wittgenstein was interested in the fact that some propositions about colour are apparently neither empirical nor, exactly, a priori, but something in between, creating the impression of a sort of phenomenology, such as Goethe's. However, Wittgenstein took the line that 'There is indeed no such thing as phenomenology, but there are phenomenological problems.' He was content to regard Goethe's observations as a kind of logic or geometry. Wittgenstein took some of his examples from the Runge letter included at the end of the "Farbenlehre", e.g. "White is the lightest colour", "There cannot be a transparent white", "There cannot be a reddish green", and so on. The logical status of these propositions in Wittgenstein's investigation, including their relation to physics, was discussed in detail in Jonathan Westphal's Colour: a Philosophical Introduction (1991).

There seem to be propositions that have the character of experiential propositions, but whose truth is for me unassailable ... There are, in any case, errors ... which must be set apart from the rest of my judgements as temporary confusions. But aren't there transitional cases between these two? ... If we introduce the concept of knowing into this investigation, it will be of no help; because knowing is not a psychological state whose special characteristics explain all kinds of things. On the contrary, the special logic of the concept 'knowing' is not that of a psychological state.

Although Remarks on Colour is considered difficult on account of its fragmentation, his last work, On Certainty (German: Über Gewissheit) is considered his most lucid. One resolution of this difficulty is that Remarks on Colour is really not fragmentary in nature, but a sustained and identifiable argument against the misleading view that colours are features of places in the visual field.

== Editions ==
- Ludwig Wittgenstein, Remarks on Colour, Oxford: Blackwell, 1977, ed. G. E. M. Anscombe and trans. Linda Schättle.

== See also ==
- Remarks on the Philosophy of Psychology
