= Treatise on Light =

Book by Christiaan Huygens

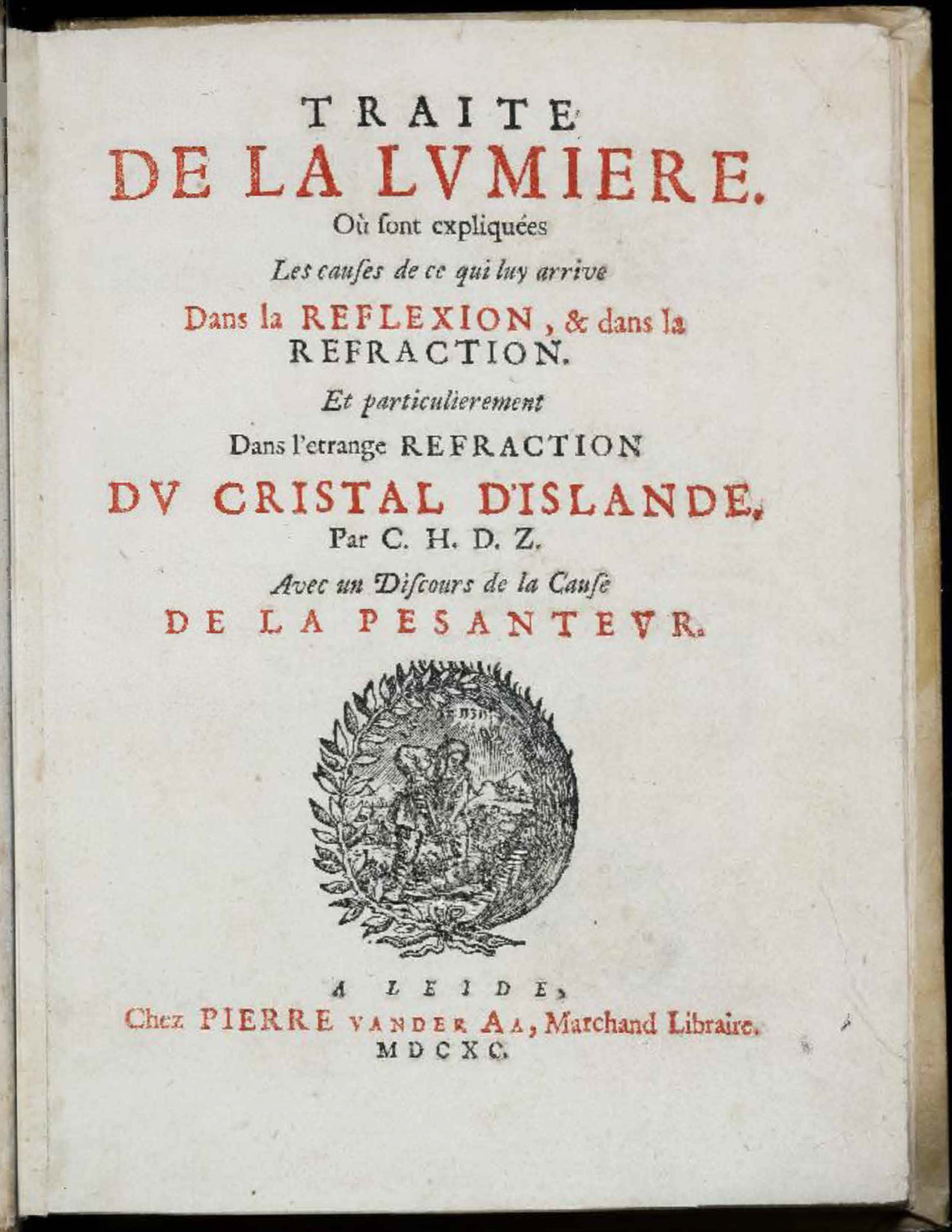
- Author: Christiaan Huygens
- Language: French
- Genre: Optics
- Published: 1690

Treatise on Light: In Which Are Explained the Causes of That Which Occurs in Reflection & Refraction (French: Traité de la Lumière: Où sont expliquées les causes de ce qui luy arrive dans la reflexion & dans la refraction) is a book written by Dutch polymath Christiaan Huygens that was published in French in 1690. The book describes Huygens's conception of the nature of light propagation which makes it possible to explain the laws of geometrical optics shown in Descartes's La Dioptrique, which Huygens aimed to replace.

Unlike Newton's corpuscular theory, which was presented in the Opticks, Huygens conceived of light as an irregular series of shock waves which proceeds with very great, but finite, velocity through the ether, similar to sound waves. Moreover, he proposed that each point of a wavefront is itself the origin of a secondary spherical wave, a principle known today as the Huygens–Fresnel principle. The book is considered a pioneering work of theoretical and mathematical physics and the first mechanistic account of an unobservable physical phenomenon.

== Overview ==
Huygens worked on the mathematics of light rays and the properties of refraction in his work Dioptrica, which began in 1652 but remained unpublished, and which predated his lens grinding work. In 1672, the problem of the strange refraction of the Iceland crystal created a puzzle regarding the physics of refraction that Huygens wanted to solve. Huygens eventually was able to solve this problem by means of elliptical waves in 1677 and confirmed his theory by experiments mostly after critical reactions in 1679.

His explanation of birefringence was based on three hypotheses: (1) there are inside the crystal two media in which light waves proceed, (2) one medium behaves as ordinary ether and carries the normally refracted ray, and (3) the velocity of the waves in the other medium is dependent on direction, so that the waves do not expand in spherical form, but rather as ellipsoids of revolution; this second extraordinary medium carries the abnormally refracted ray. By studying the symmetry of the crystal, Huygens was able to determine the direction of the axis of the ellipsoids, and from the refraction properties of the abnormal ray he established the proportion between the axes. He calculated the refraction of rays on plane sections of the crystal other than the natural crystal sides, and ultimately verified many of his results experimentally.

Huygens intended to publish his results as part of the Dioptrica but decided to separate his theory of light from the rest of the work at the last minute, marking the transition from geometrical to physical optics. More than a century later, it would take Étienne Malus and others fifteen years to reconstruct Huygens's ideas of rays and wavefronts.

== Contents ==
=== Propagation medium ===
In the first chapter, Huygens describes light as a disturbance which moves in a material medium of an unknown nature which he calls ethereal, and which is different from that which propagates sound. This ethereal matter is composed of elastic particles of matter which collide according to laws he discovered in 1669.

Huygens considers that the structure of matter is atomic, made up of an assembly of particles "which touch each other without composing a continuous solid." Light waves can therefore move from one particle to another without these being displaced. Another way of looking at the problem of propagation is to consider that it is not the particles of the transparent medium which transmit light but the particles of ethereal matter which permeate the interstices of the solid or liquid matter (or even a vacuum, since light passes through the top of Torricelli's barometer). Finally, Huygens considers a third type of light propagation that would be a combination of the first two.

Another concept discussed in the first chapter is the speed of light, where Huygens originally takes up the temporal conception of Pierre de Fermat. He considers that the "shaking" producing light waves necessarily moves at finite speed, even if it is very high. This point is very important because its demonstrations are based on the equivalence of travel times on different paths. Huygens reports on a letter by Ole Christensen Rømer, dated from 1677, where the speed of light is said to be at least 100,000 times faster than the speed of sound, and possibly six times higher. In the latter case, the speed found by Rømer (214,000 km /s) was of the same order of magnitude as the speed of light admitted today.

=== Nature of the wavefront ===
Huygens's illustration of a wavefront in Treatise on Light (1690).

Following his remarks on the propagation medium and the speed of light, Huygens gives a geometric illustration of the wavefront, the foundation of what became known as Huygens’ Principle. His principle of propagation is a demonstration of how a wave of light (or rather a pulse) emanating from a point also results in smaller wavelets:

...each of these waves can be infinitely feeble only as compared with the [primary wave], to the composition of which all the others contribute by the part of their surface which is most distant from [the wave’s origin].

This means that each particle in the ether is the source of a new wavefront, and although these “secondary wavelets” are characterized by Huygens as “feeble,” points on each wavelet collectively form the primary wave that is visible as light. The new wavefront, then, is the tangential surface to all the secondary wavelets in the direction of propagation.

Critical to Huygens’s analysis is that these secondary wavelets can be mathematically constructed, allowing one to work backward from the secondary wavelets to construct a primary wave which has traveled for a certain time. This is the principle on which Huygens's entire theory of light turns, and it is what separates his theory from those of his predecessors.

=== Remainder of the book ===
Chapter two briefly treats reflection while chapters three and four explore refraction. Huygens carefully explains the differences between transparent and opaque media in terms of their particulate composition, specifically exploring atmospheric refraction.

Chapter five addresses the strange refraction of the Iceland crystal. Huygens cuts a piece of the crystal and studies the geometry of light propagation inside it before guiding the reader through a series of step-by-step empirical investigations. His explanation of strange refraction is based on the properties of the ordinary ray and the extraordinary ray. The ordinary ray has a spherical wavefront due to a constant refractive index, which is independent of the propagation direction inside the crystal, having the same velocity in all directions. The extraordinary ray, on the other hand, has an ellipsoidal wavefront due to its refractive index, which varies with the propagation direction within the crystal, leading to different velocities in different directions. Thus, when light travels through the crystal, it breaks into two wave surfaces that follow distinct paths within it, resulting in two refracted rays being observed.

The series of step-by-step investigations that follow were meant to corroborate Huygens' explanation of strange refraction. They were prompted by early objections from Rømer and constitute one of the few examples in Huygens’s work where he provided such details regarding experiments. Huygens employed these mathematical and experimental resources to achieve impressive results, some of which defied verification until the beginning of the 19th century.

Chapter six of the book concludes with a discussion on refraction and reflection in transparent bodies.

== Legacy ==
Wave refraction in the manner of Huygens

Huygens's major accomplishment in the Treatise on Light is the demonstration that one could derive all the essential features of rectilinear propagation, reflection, and simple and double refraction from the rate of propagation of light waves alone. By reducing the ray to a geometrical construct devoid of physical character, Huygens was able to treat the theory of light kinematically (and thereby mathematically), allow him to succeed where his predecessors have failed.

Although the completeness of Huygens's analysis is impressive, he was unable to comprehend the effect that we now recognize as polarization, which occurs if the refracted ray is directed through a second crystal of which the orientation is varied. He also did not address a number of issues, such as chromatic aberration and color, both of which were explained by Newton, although he had experienced them while building his telescopes.

Apart from Antoine Parent and René Just Haüy, Huygens's ideas in the Treatise on Light were largely forgotten in the century after its publication. Many of these ideas were developed independently by Augustin-Jean Fresnel in the early 19th century and later published in his Mémoire sur la Diffraction de la Lumière (1818). Fresnel subsequently became aware of Huygens's work and adapted Huygens's principle to give a complete explanation of the rectilinear propagation and diffraction effects of light in 1821. The principle is now known as the Huygens–Fresnel Principle.

== See also ==
- Iceland spar
- Luminiferous aether
