= James Black (physician, born 1787) =

Black, James (1788/9–1867), physician

- Born: 1787; Scotland
- Died: 1867 (aged 79–80)
- Education: the Royal College of Surgeons of Edinburgh
- Occupation: physician

James Black FRSE FGS (1787–1867) was a Scottish physician, geologist and paleontologist who investigated the capillary circulation of the blood (1825), as well as matters of fever and bowels.

== Life ==
Born in Scotland in 1787.

In 1808 he was granted a Licentiate of the Royal College of Surgeons of Edinburgh.

He was an Assistant Surgeon in the Royal Navy in 1809, during the Napoleonic Wars.

In 1820 he was awarded a Doctorate in Medicine at Glasgow.

He was then a doctor in Newton Stewart in south-west Scotland before being given a post of House Physician at the Union Hospital in Manchester in 1839. At the same time he lectured in Forensic Medicine from 1840. In 1848 he adopted the same role in Bolton and in 1856 returned to Scotland to the far more prestigious lecturing role at Edinburgh University.

In 1857 he was elected a Fellow of the Royal Society of Edinburgh and in 1860 he was elected a Fellow of the Royal College of Physicians.

Around 1859 he appears to have left Edinburgh and returned to Manchester and in that year he appears as president of the Manchester Philosophical Society. He was also a member of the Manchester Geological Society, the Medico-Chirugical Society and Social Science Association.

He died in Edinburgh on 30 April 1867.
