= 10 yen note =

Former denomination of Japanese yen paper currency

- Country: Japan
- Value: 10 Japanese yen
- Security features: Watermarks
- Years of printing: 1872–1946 (Note: April 1, 1955 is a de jure "suspension" date given by the Bank of Japan. While the final issue was last printed in 1946, these "A series" notes are still legal tender.)

Obverse
- Design: Various designs depending on the series.

Reverse
- Design: Various designs depending on the series.

The 10 yen note (10円券) was a denomination of Japanese yen for use in commerce.

== Government and national bank notes ==
=== Meiji tsuho (1872–1879) ===
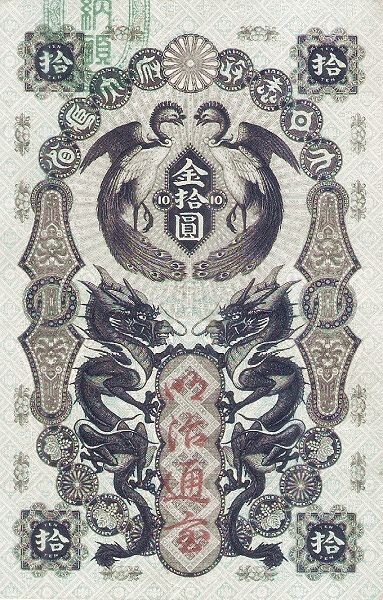
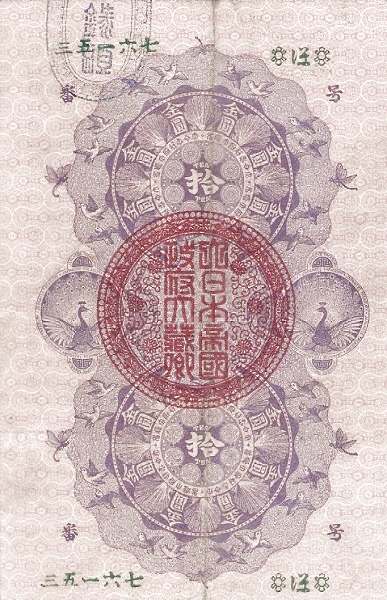
10 Yen "Meiji Tsūhō" note from 1872

The first ten-yen notes adopted and released by the Japanese government are part of a series known as Meiji Tsūhō (明治通宝). These notes were the first Japanese currency ever to be printed using western printing at Dondorf and Naumann, which was located in Frankfurt. Meiji Tsuho notes were designed by Edoardo Chiossone sometime in 1870 while he was working for Dondorf Naumann on behalf of the National Bank of the Kingdom of Italy. The process of making Chiossone's proposed design a reality started with the establishment of the "Imperial Printing Bureau of Japan" in 1871 (4th year of Meiji). To produce the currency the Japanese government reached out to Dondorf and Naumann to gain access to Western technology. Chiossone had a falling out with Italian Bank as his relationship with them had hit a breaking point. When the company suggested Chiossone for the role as engraver, he quickly accepted the offer. The production of money was handed over to the Imperial Printing Bureau in January 1872 when banknotes began to arrive from Germany. All of these arrivals were purposely left incomplete due to security reasons, as the words "Meiji Tsuho" and the mark of the Minister of Finance were added by the Imperial Printing Bureau. Woodblock printing was eventually employed to save hundreds of people the work of handwriting the characters "Meiji Tsuho" on each individual note. Ten yen notes in particular were released in April 1872 (year 5 of Meiji) measuring 137mm x 89mm in size. Printing was initially done in Germany before Western technology was brought over to Japan. This allowed the Japanese government to produce some ten yen Meiji Tsūhō notes domestically. Overall, Meiji Tsūhō notes feature an elaborate design that was difficult to forge at the time as counterfeiting was previously rampant with clan notes.

The elaborate design worked against counterfeiters for an unknown period of time before they found a way around it. Processing Meiji Tsūhō notes at the time normally involved Japanese officials, who would add stamps to the notes finalizing the process. At some point in time under unknown circumstances unstamped notes sent to Japan from Germany were legally obtained by counterfeiters who then added their own stamps. Another major issue was the Satsuma Rebellion in February 1877, which helped lead to massive inflation due to the amount of inconvertible notes issued for payment. The Japanese government responded by halting the issuance of government notes in 1879 as a hopeful remedy to the situation. During this time, legal tender Meiji Tsuho ten yen notes had issues with paper quality and were circulating with counterfeits. These problems led the Japanese government to issue redesigned ten yen banknotes in 1882 to replace the old Meiji Tsuho notes. Additional measures were subsequently put into place which included the establishment of a centralized bank known as the Bank of Japan. All of the remaining Meiji Tsuho notes in circulation that weren't already redeemed were to be retired in favor of either gold coinage or newly printed Bank of Japan notes. This period of exchange lapsed when Meiji Tsuho notes were abolished on December 9, 1899.

=== National bank notes (1873–1880) ===
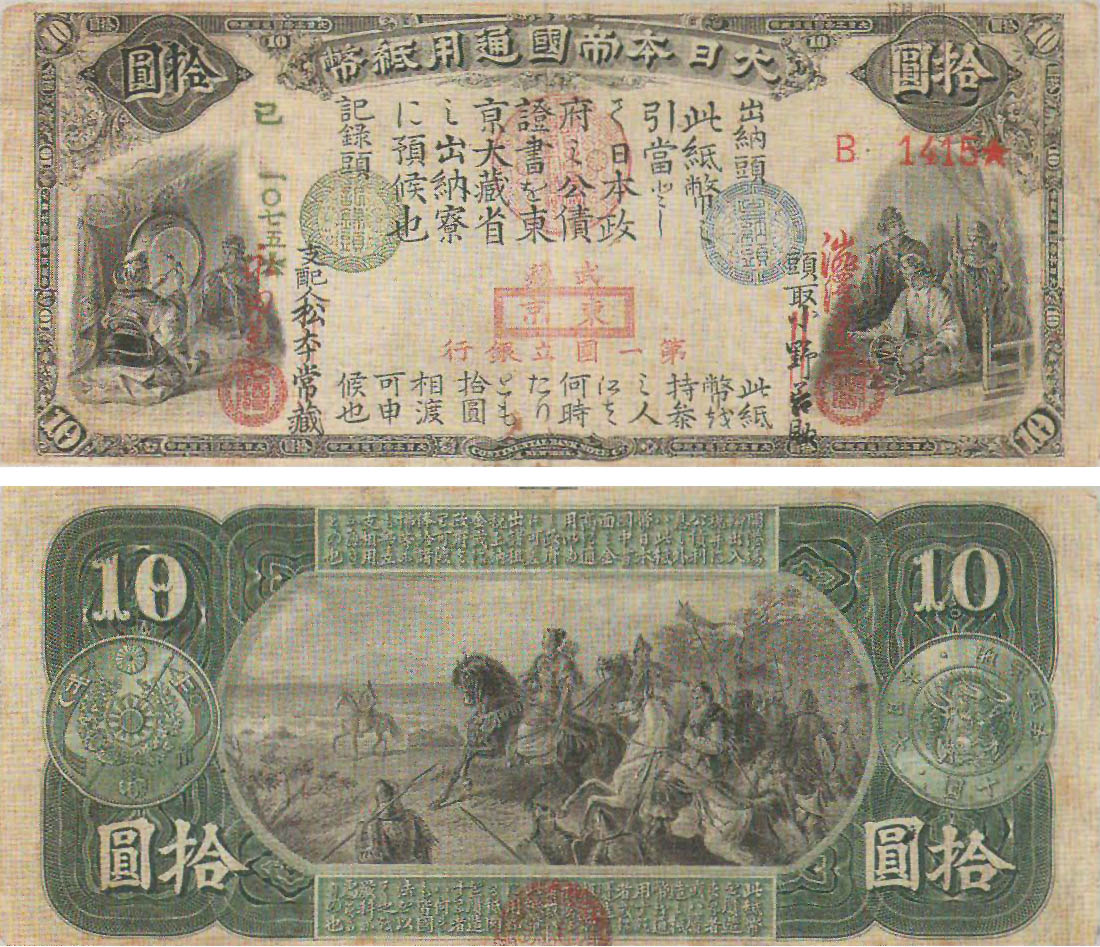
Old national bank note (ten yen)

The idea for national bank notes (国立銀行紙幣) in Japan came from Itō Hirobumi when he was studying the United States in 1871. During this time the Meiji government was working to establish a gold-backed monetary system based on Hirobumi's recommendation. The Japanese government accepted Hirobumi's proposal for national bank notes in 1872 by establishing the "National Bank Act" which organized a decentralized "U.S.-style" system of national banks. Each of these banks was chartered by the state to issue notes exchangeable for gold from reserves held by the banks. Permission was eventually given to these private banks allowing national bank notes to be issued in August 1873. These first national bank notes are now referred to as old national bank notes (旧国立銀行券).

Ten-yen national bank notes in particular measure 80 mm × 190 mm in size and are modeled after their counterparts in the United States. The obverse features a Gagaku performance with convertible wording, while the reverse depicts Empress Jingū's legendary conquest of Korea flanked by 10 yen gold coins. These circulated as convertible notes for roughly three years before the rising price of gold became an issue. An amendment to the National Bank Act was adopted in August 1876 making the notes inconvertible. Under this amendment there was no limit on the amount of paper money that could be issued. It also allowed private banks to redeem national bank notes for government issued inconvertible Meiji Tsuho notes rather than for gold. The negative effect from this amendment was the former of the two which allowed an unlimited amount of notes. Inflation was soon greatly amplified by the Satsuma Rebellion in February 1877. While the rebellion was quickly resolved, the Japanese government had to print a large amount of fiat notes as payment.

In July 1877 then prime minister Ōkuma Shigenobu realized that keeping Japan on a gold standard was pointless given the low price of silver. The silver one yen coin was thus brought into domestic commerce on May 27, 1878, switching Japan to a de facto silver standard. This did not resolve the underlying problem as fiat currency continued to lose its value against silver coinage. The issuance of national fiat banknotes was eventually suspended in 1880 by then prime minister Matsukata Masayoshi. During this time Matsukata's introduced policies of fiscal restraint were given the nickname "Matsukata Deflation". The most significant of these policies established a centralized banking system through the "Bank of Japan Regulation" on June 27, 1882, by proclamation No. 32. An amendment was passed in May 1883, which allowed all of the old notes (Meiji Tsuho & National Bank Notes) to be collected and exchanged by notes from the central bank. Silver reserves were replenished as the amount of paper currency in circulation decreased. This in turn drove up the value of paper currency until it was about equal to that of silver coins by the end of 1885. The National Bank Act was amended again in March 1896, providing for the dissolution of the national banks on the expiration of their charters. This amendment also prohibited national bank notes from circulating after December 31, 1899. The ongoing redemption process took additional time as national bank notes were not fully removed from circulation until 1904.

=== Modified "jingū" banknotes (1883–1887) ===
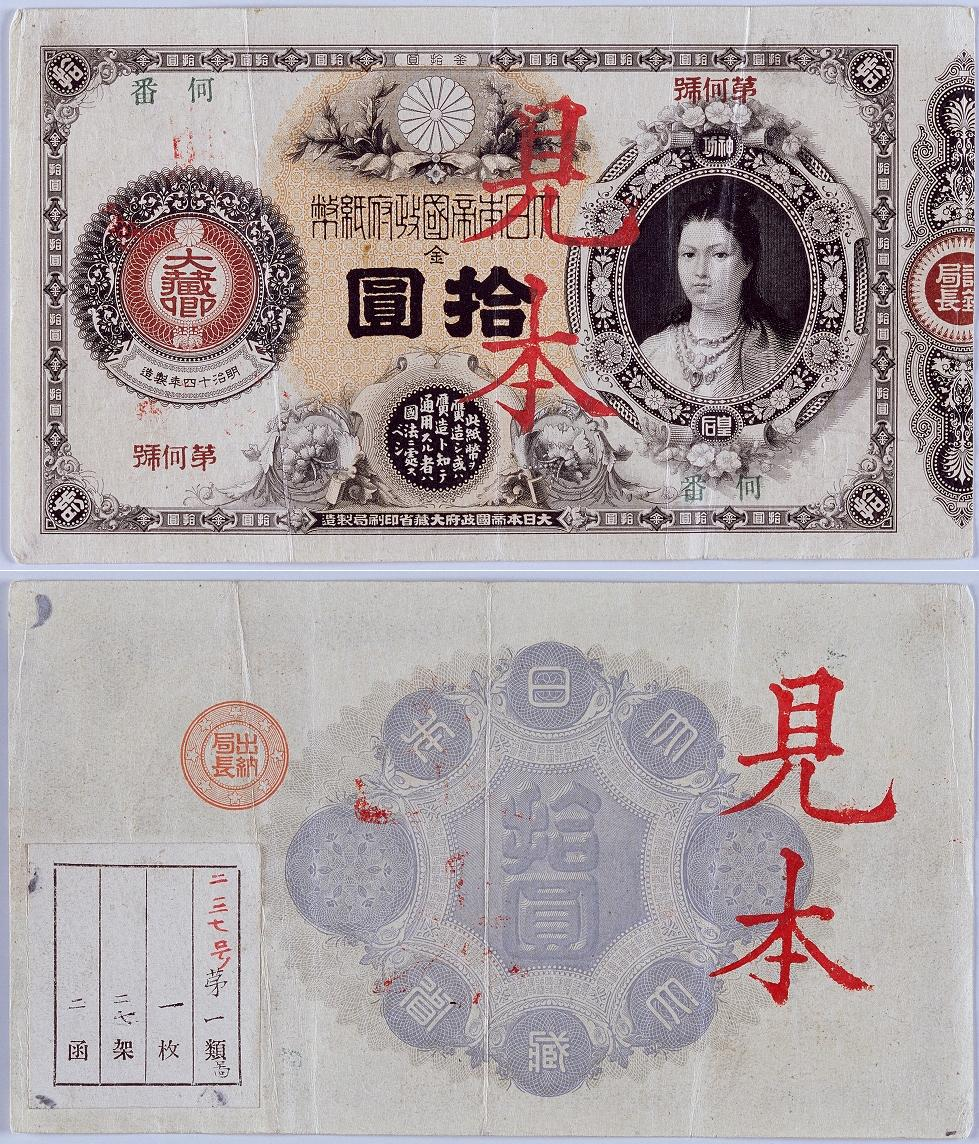
"Jingū" 10 yen note (Note: The red characters on the note in the image are not on circulating examples. These translate to Mihon or "SPECIMEN".)

Previous Meiji Tsūhō ten yen notes were printed using western technology which had its disadvantages in terms of quality. Over time these fragile notes became discolored easily due to the climate of Japan. Counterfeiting was another issue as thieves eventually found a way around the elaborate Meiji Tsūhō design. The Japanese government took action by releasing a new series referred to as modified banknotes (改造紙幣). Ten yen notes measure 93mm x 165mm in size, and are commonly referred to as Empress Jingu 10-yen notes (神功皇后10円札) because of their design. These notes feature an artist's representation of Empress Jingū that was commissioned by Italian engraver Edoardo Chiossone. This design is notable for being the first portrait on a Japanese banknote, and the only female depicted in the history of Japanese paper currency. Also present on the obverse are counterfeit penalties which were later expanded in the Meiji era. On the reverse side of the note are inscriptions from the Ministry of Finance, and the Treasurer's seal. These "modified banknotes" are also watermarked which was considered a major feature to aid against counterfeiting.

When ten-yen modified banknotes were released on September 9, 1883 (year 16 of Meiji) they were intended to be exchanged for old Meiji Tsuho notes. While a new centralized bank known as the Bank of Japan had been established in the previous year, it was not ready to issue convertible notes right away. The first Bank of Japan notes were released in May 1885 and were convertible to silver starting in January 1886. However, Bank of Japan notes with a denomination of ten yen were not released until May 9, 1887. The Japanese government later adopted the gold standard on March 26, 1897, which switched over the redemption of government banknotes from silver to gold. Redemption of old silver coins for new gold coins at par began on October 1, 1897, and lasted until its closure on July 31, 1898. Around the same time, a deadline was set in June 1898 to prohibit circulation of government notes by the end of the century. Modified ten yen "Jingū" banknotes were abolished by the set deadline on December 31, 1899.

== Bank of Japan notes ==
=== Daikokuten notes (1887–1939) ===
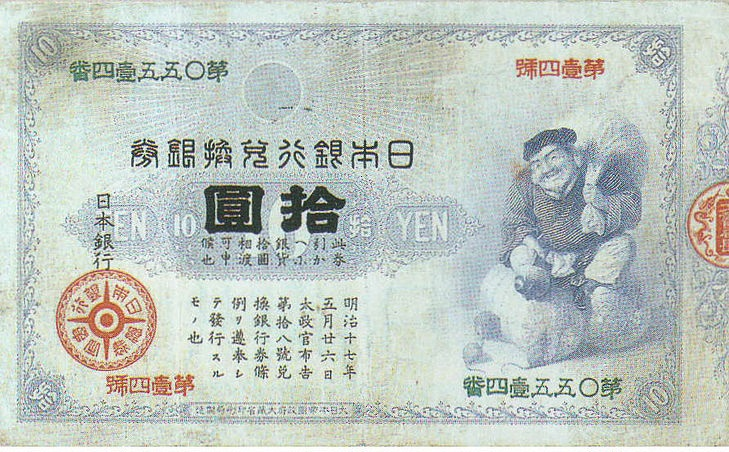
Obverse side of a Daikokuten 10 yen note

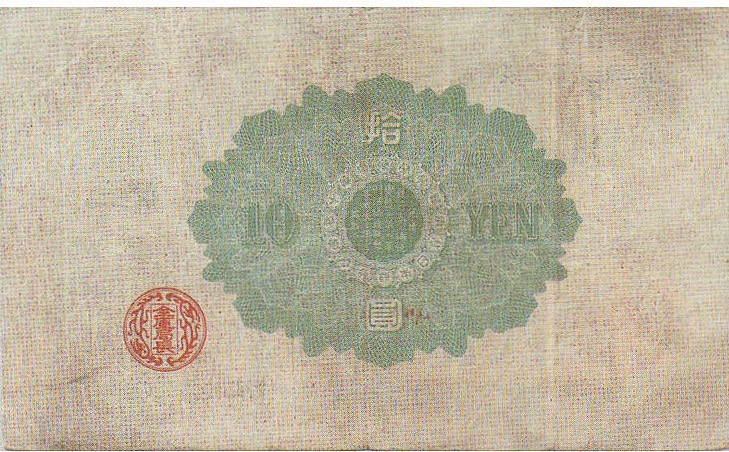
Reverse side showing a colored pattern

During the early 1880s, then prime minister Matsukata Masayoshi was dealing with a serious inflation problem. The value of in-convertible Government and National Bank Notes was devalued as too many notes were in circulation. In response, Masayoshi suspended the issuance of these notes and established a centralized banking system through the "Bank of Japan Regulation" on June 27, 1882. The Bank of Japan commenced operations on October 10, 1882, with the authority to print banknotes that could be exchanged for the old Government and National Bank Notes. An amendment was passed in May 1883, which allowed all of the old notes (Meiji Tsuho & National Bank Notes) to be collected and exchanged by notes from the central bank. These notes couldn't be issued immediately as there was an imbalance between existing coins and notes in regards to silver. With the redemption of old government fiat notes eventually the price of silver alloy stabilized.

The Japanese government established a convertible bank note system by Dajo-kwan Notification No. 18 in May 1884. Concurrently, the amount of old paper currency in circulation decreased allowing the amount of silver reserves to grow. This drove up the value of paper currency until it was about equal to that of silver coins by the end of 1885. There is a disagreement among sources on the exact release date of the first Bank of Japan notes. Older sources give a date somewhere in "May 1885" with one source specifically pointing to May 9, 1885. Japan was eventually placed on a silver standard with laws enacted to issue silver for the notes starting in January 1886. Bank of Japan notes with a denomination of ten yen however, were not released until May 9, 1887 (year 20 of Meiji). Ten yen notes from this series are commonly called Ura Daikoku 10 yen (裏大黒10円) after the lucky god Daikokuten featured in the design. Officially they are referred to as former convertible banknotes (旧兌換銀行券) in relation to events that occurred since their release. (Note: The Bank of Japan no longer honors the obligation to convert yen into silver.) Ten yen notes measure 93mm X 156mm in size and were designed by Italian engraver Edoardo Chiossone. Daikokuten is featured on the obverse with the inscription NIPPON GINKO Promises to Pay the Bearer on Demand Ten Yen in Silver. The reverse meanwhile features a colored pattern with the value written in English, and counterfeit penalties written in Kanji. Security features include a character watermark that reads "Bank of Japan Note" when held up to a light source.

Ten-yen Daikoku notes were only printed for a few years due to problems involving the design. One of these defects involved the addition of "konjac powder" to increase the strength of the bill. This powder wound up attracting rats and insects which would easily damage the bills by chewing on them. Another issue had to due with the "blue ink" in the watermark that was used to prevent counterfeiting. The ink used was mixed with white lead as a pigment causing it to turn black when it reacted with hydrogen sulfide in hot spring areas. The Japanese government later adopted the gold standard on March 26, 1897, which switched over the redemption of Bank of Japan notes from silver to gold. Redemption of old silver coins for new gold coins at par began on October 1, 1897, and lasted until its closure on July 31, 1898. These notes continued to be redeemable in gold until September 1917, due to a gold embargo that lasted until January 1930. Ten yen Daikoku notes were ultimately abolished on March 31, 1939 (year 14 of Shōwa) as a new convertible banking law came into effect.

=== Modified convertible banknotes (1890–1939) ===
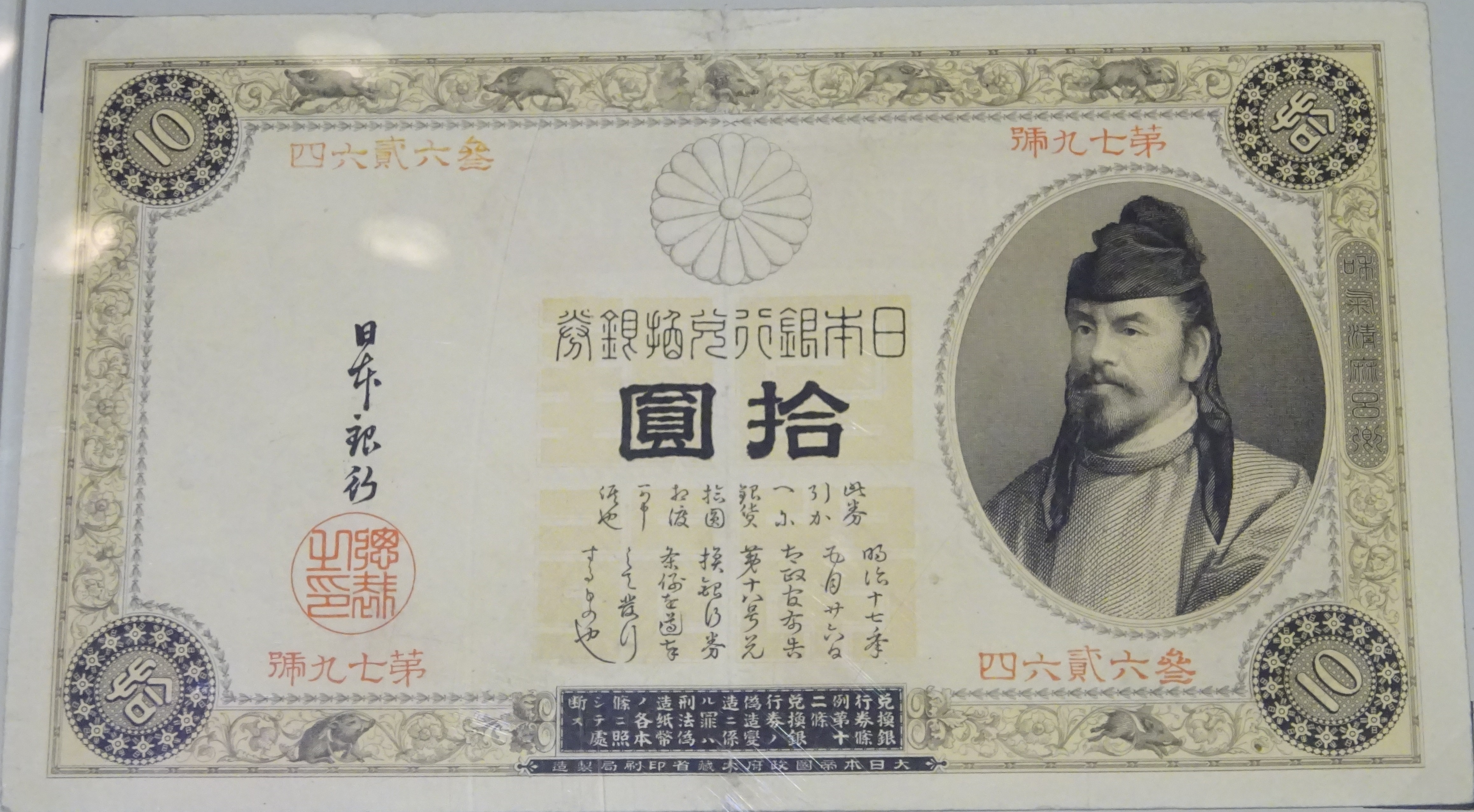
Obverse side of a Modified Convertible 10 yen note

On September 12, 1890 (23rd year of Meiji) the Bank of Japan printed new ten yen silver certificates to replace the old "Daikokuten" notes. This action had to be undertaken to address design flaws which caused the latter series to be eaten and discolored. Modified ten yen notes aka former convertible banknotes (旧兌換銀行券) (officially), are commonly called Omote Boar 10 Yen (表猪10円札) or "front boar 10 yen" as Wild Boars with Wake no Kiyomaro are present in the obverse side's design. Kiyomaro was selected for the modified convertible banknotes from among the seven candidates which included Sakanoue no Tamuramaro and Sugawara no Michizane. The portrait of Kiyomaro was designed by Edoardo Chiossone using a real person as a model, with references to literary materials, paintings, sculptures, and research by scholar Mayori Kurokawa. There are alternate theories on who Chiossone chose for a model which include Kido Takayoshi, and Sada Seij who was the head of the engraving department of the Printing Bureau at the time. On reverse side of the note is convertible wording written in English NIPPON GINKO Promises to Pay the Bearer on Demand Ten Yen in Silver. Anti-counterfeiting measures include an elaborate design for the portrait of Kiyomaro, and watermarks with the words Ginkin Shuen with a chrysanthemum pattern.

From their initial release this series is separated into an early and late period of printing. Those printed in the early period have a group number which ranges from 1 to 5 (第壹號 – 第壹〇五號), and serial numbers with 5 digits (maximum "40000"). Notes from the late period have a group number starting with 106 (第壹〇六號), and serial numbers with 6 digits (maximum "900000"). There is no information regarding the period of publication other than their initial printing on September 12, 1890. Originally these modified banknotes were intended to be silver certificates that could be converted through a bank transaction into silver coinage. Problems arose when foreign countries left the silver standard leading to a large increase in worldwide silver production. As the price of silver dropped the value of the silver yen went along with it causing inflation. This was later resolved when Japan began minting gold coins starting in October 1897 as the government switched from a silver standard to a gold standard. Redemption of old silver coins for new gold coins at par began on October 1, 1897, and lasted until its closure on July 31, 1898. While the word "Silver" remained on 10 yen modified banknotes, they were allowed at the time to be exchanged for gold. Ten yen modified banknotes continued to be redeemable in gold until September 1917, due to a gold embargo that lasted until January 1930. They were ultimately abolished on March 31, 1939 (year 14 of Shōwa) as a new convertible banking law came into effect.

== See also ==
- Bank of Japan
- Banknotes of the Japanese yen
- Silver certificate (United States)
