= 5 yen note =

Former denomination of Japanese yen paper currency

- Country: Japan
- Value: 5 Japanese yen
- Security features: Watermarks
- Years of printing: 1872–1946 (Note: April 1, 1955, is a de jure "suspension" date given by the Bank of Japan. It is cited in the "A series" section that the final issue was last printed in 1946.)

Obverse
- Design: Various designs depending on the series.

Reverse
- Design: Various designs depending on the series.

The 5 yen note (5円券) was a denomination of Japanese yen in twelve different series from 1872 to 1955 for use in commerce. Only those from the "A series", which was issued from 1946 to 1955 are legal tender today.

== Government and National Bank Notes ==
=== Meiji Tsuho (1872-1879) ===
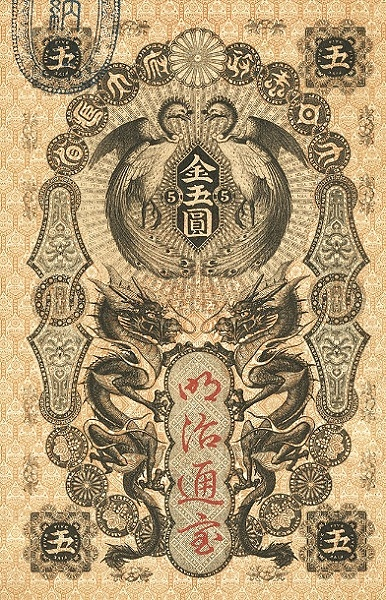
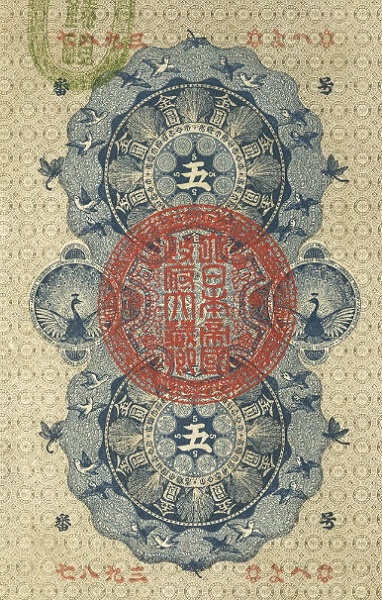
5 Yen "Meiji Tsūhō" note from 1872

The first five yen notes adopted and released by the Japanese government are part of a series known as Meiji Tsūhō (明治通宝). These notes were the first Japanese currency ever to be printed using western printing at Dondorf and Naumann, which was located in Frankfurt. Meiji Tsuho notes were designed by Edoardo Chiossone sometime in 1870 while he was working for Dondorf Naumann on behalf of The National Bank in the Kingdom of Italy. The process of making Chiossone's proposed design a reality started with the establishment of the "Imperial Printing Bureau of Japan" in 1871 (4th year of Meiji). In order to produce the currency the Japanese government reached out to Dondorf and Naumann to gain access to Western technology. Chiossone had a falling out with Italian Bank as his relationship with them had hit a breaking point. When the company suggested Chiossone for the role as engraver, he quickly accepted the offer. The production of money was handed over to the Imperial Printing Bureau in January 1872 when banknotes began to arrive from Germany. All of these arrivals were purposely left incomplete due to security reasons, as the words "Meiji Tsuho" and the mark of the Minister of Finance were added by the Imperial Printing Bureau. Woodblock printing was eventually employed to save hundreds of people the work of handwriting the characters "Meiji Tsuho" on each individual note. Five yen notes in particular were released on June 25, 1872 (year 5 of Meiji) measuring 137mm x 89mm in size. These notes feature an elaborate design that was difficult to forge at the time as counterfeiting was previously rampant with clan notes. While the Japanese later produced some Meiji Tsuho notes domestically, the entire production for this denomination was done in Germany.

The elaborate design worked against counterfeiters for an unknown period of time before they found a way around it. Unstamped notes sent to Japan from Germany were legally obtained by these thieves. Normally Japanese officials would add stamps to the notes finalizing the process, where in this case the counterfeiters added their own stamps. Another major issue was the Satsuma Rebellion in February 1877, which helped lead to massive inflation due to the amount of inconvertible notes issued for payment. The Japanese government responded by halting the issuance of government notes in 1879 as a hopeful remedy to the situation. During this time legal tender Meiji Tsuho five yen notes had issues with paper quality, and were circulating with counterfeits. These problems led the Japanese government to issue redesigned five yen banknotes in 1882 to replace the old Meiji Tsuho notes. Additional measures were subsequently put into place which included the establishment of a centralized bank known as the Bank of Japan. All of the remaining Meiji Tsuho notes in circulation that weren't already redeemed were to be retired in favor of either gold coinage or newly printed Bank of Japan notes. This period of exchange lapsed when Meiji Tsuho notes were abolished on December 9, 1899.

=== National Bank Notes (1873-1880) ===
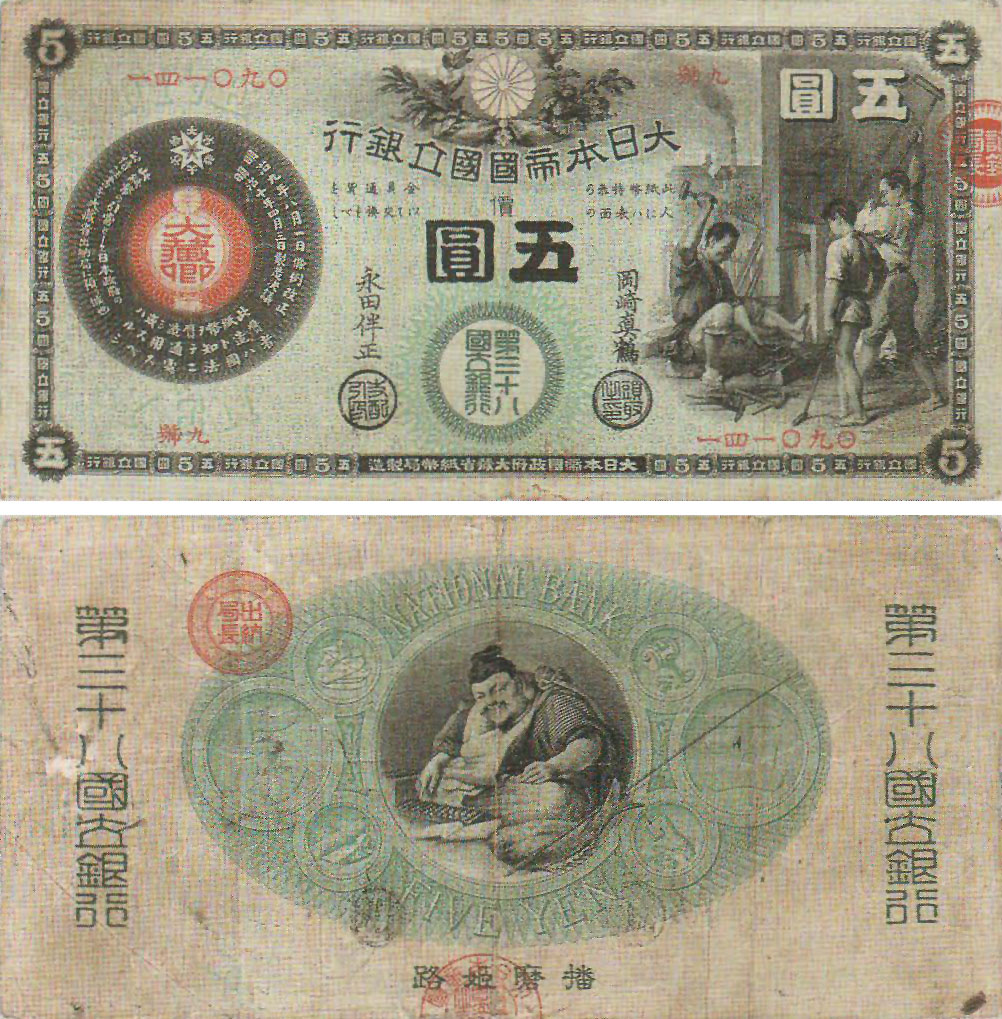
New national bank note (five yen)

The idea for national bank notes (国立銀行紙幣) in Japan came from Itō Hirobumi when he was studying the United States in 1871. During this time the Meiji government was working to establish a gold-backed monetary system based on Hirobumi's recommendation. The Japanese government accepted Hirobumi's proposal for national bank notes in 1872 by establishing the "National Bank Act" which organized a decentralized "U.S.-style" system of national banks. Each of these banks was chartered by the state to issue notes exchangeable for gold from reserves held by the banks. Permission was eventually given to these private banks allowing national bank notes to be issued in August 1873. The first bank notes issued are also referred to as old national bank notes (旧国立銀行券). Five yen national bank notes in particular measure 80 mm x 190 mm in size, and are modeled after their counterparts in the United States. The obverse features rice planting, harvesting, and bank seals, while the reverse depicts a distant view of Nihonbashi with Mt. Fuji. These circulated as convertible notes for roughly three years before the rising price of gold became an issue. An amendment to the National Bank Act was adopted in August 1876 making the notes inconvertible. Under this amendment there was no limit on the amount of paper money that could be issued. This action also allowed private banks to redeem national bank notes for government issued inconvertible Meiji Tsuho notes rather than for gold. Negative effects from this amendment in the form of inflation were greatly amplified by the Satsuma Rebellion in February 1877. While the rebellion was quickly resolved, the Japanese government had to print a large amount of fiat notes as payment.

National fiat banknotes are also referred to as new national bank notes (新国立銀行券) as they differ from their older counterparts in place of origin. These notes were produced domestically rather than the more difficult task of outsourcing them to the United States for printing. Five yen fiat notes measure 89mm x 174mm in size, and are commonly known as blacksmith five-yen (鍛冶屋5円) due to the design. This obverse design depicts blacksmiths along with seals from the corresponding bank of issuance. The reverse side meanwhile features the Japanese god of fishermen and luck (Ebisu). In July 1877 then prime minister Ōkuma Shigenobu realized that keeping Japan on a gold standard was pointless given the low price of silver. The silver one yen coin was thus brought into domestic commerce on May 27, 1878, switching Japan to a de facto silver standard. This did little good for fiat currency as it continued to lose its value against silver coinage. The issuance of national fiat banknotes was ultimately suspended in 1880 by then prime minister Matsukata Masayoshi. During this time Matsukata introduced a policy of fiscal restraint that resulted in what has come to be called the "Matsukata Deflation". The most significant of these policies established a centralized banking system through the "Bank of Japan Regulation" on June 27, 1882, by proclamation No. 32. In order to decrease inflation all of the old notes were to be collected and exchanged by notes from the central bank. The first step of this process came with an amendment to the regulation in May 1883, which provided the redemption and retirement of national bank notes. As the amount of paper currency in circulation decreased, the amount of silver reserves increased. This drove up the value of paper currency until it was about equal to that of silver coins by the end of 1885. The National Bank Act was amended again in March 1896, providing for the dissolution of the national banks on the expiration of their charters. This amendment also prohibited national bank notes from circulating after December 31, 1899. The ongoing redemption process took additional time as national bank notes were not fully removed from circulation until 1904.

=== Modified "Jingū" Banknotes (1882-1886) ===
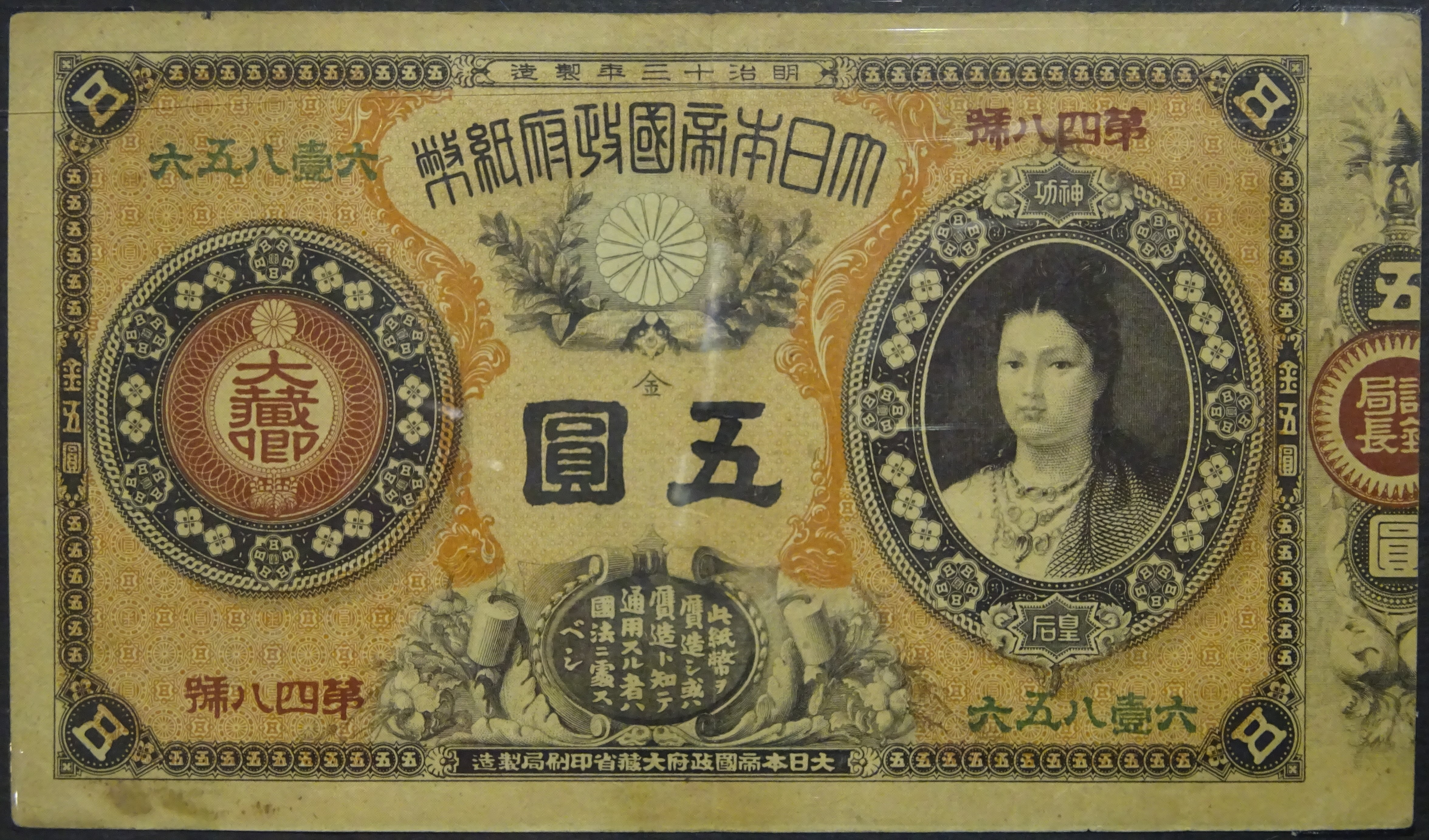
Obverse side of a "Jingū" 5 yen note

Previous Meiji Tsūhō five yen notes were printed using western technology which had its disadvantages in terms of quality. Over time these fragile notes became discolored easily due to the climate of Japan. Counterfeiting was another issue as these thieves eventually found a way around the elaborate Meiji Tsūhō design. The Japanese government took action by releasing a new series referred to as modified banknotes (改造紙幣). Five yen notes measure 83mm x 146mm in size, and are commonly referred to as Empress Jingu 5-yen notes (神功皇后5円札) because of their design. These notes feature an artist's representation of Empress Jingū that was commissioned by Italian engraver Edoardo Chiossone. This design is notable for being the first portrait on a Japanese banknote, and the only female depicted in the history of Japanese paper currency. Also present on the obverse are counterfeit penalties which were later expanded in the Meiji era. The reverse side meanwhile features inscriptions from the Ministry of Finance, and displays the Treasurer's seal. These notes are also watermarked which was considered a major feature to aid against counterfeiting. Five yen modified banknotes were released in July 1882 (year 15 of Meiji), and were intended to be exchanged for old Meiji Tsuho notes. During this time inflation hit an all-time high due to the amount of non convertible paper currency in circulation (see section above). Measures were put into place which included the establishment of a centralized bank known as the Bank of Japan in 1882. All of the paper money in circulation was to be retired in favor of either silver coinage or newly printed Bank of Japan notes. Five yen modified banknotes notes were redeemed for silver starting in January 1886 as production decreased for the series. The Japanese government adopted the gold standard on March 26, 1897, which switched over the redemption of government banknotes from silver to gold. Redemption of old silver coins for new gold coins at par began on October 1, 1897, and lasted until its closure on July 31, 1898. Around the same time, a deadline was set in June 1898 to prohibit circulation of government notes by the end of the century. Modified five yen "Jingū" banknotes were abolished by the set deadline on December 31, 1899.

== Bank of Japan Notes ==
=== Daikokuten Notes (1886-1939) ===
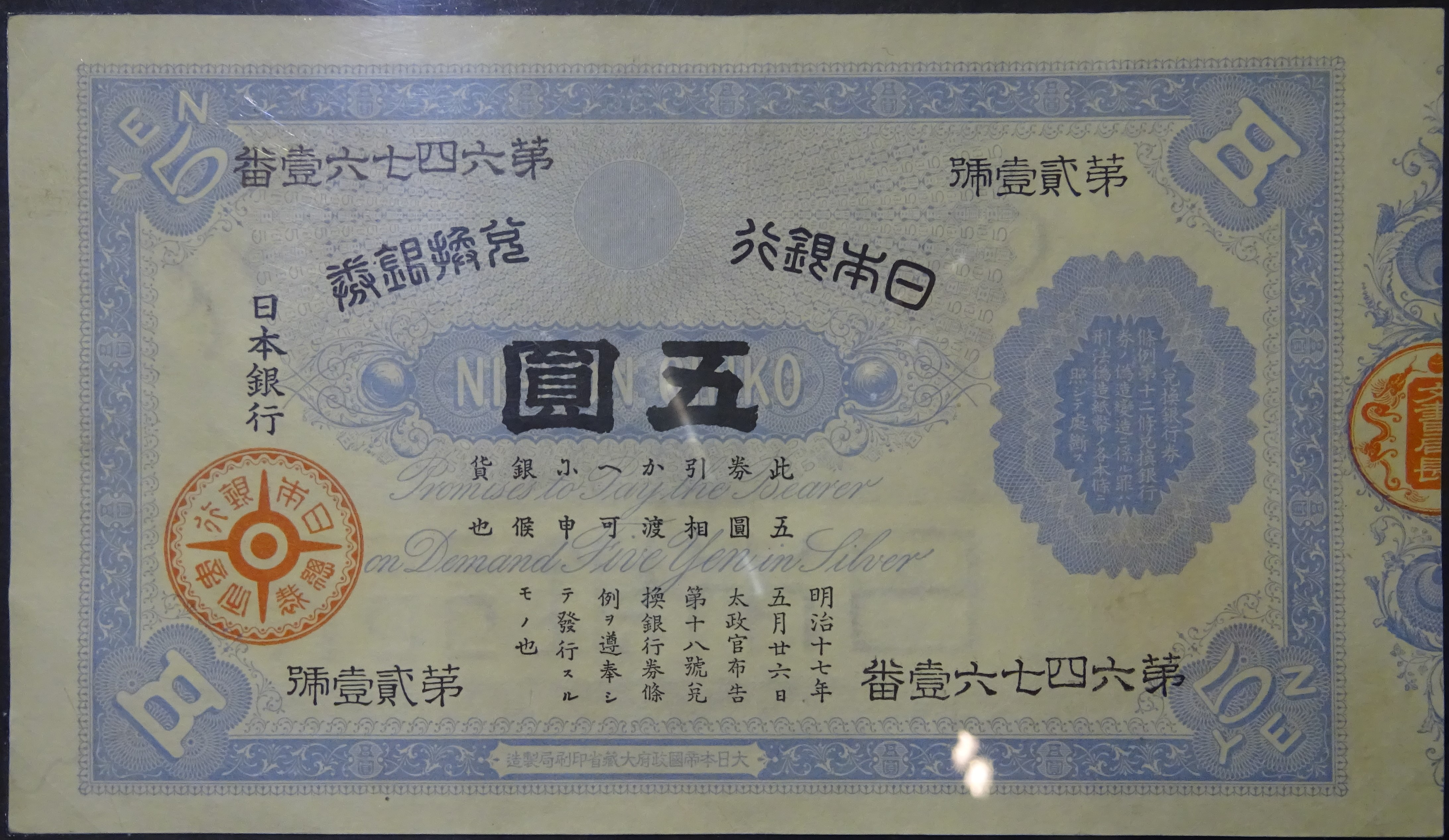
Obverse side of a Daikokuten 5 yen note

During the early 1880s, then prime minister Matsukata Masayoshi was dealing with a serious inflation problem. The value of inconvertible Government and National Bank Notes was devalued as too many notes were in circulation. In response, Masayoshi suspended the issuance of these notes and established a centralized banking system through the "Bank of Japan Regulation" on June 27, 1882. The Bank of Japan commenced operations on October 10, 1882, with the authority to print banknotes that could be exchanged for the old Government and National Bank Notes. The first step of this process came with an amendment to the regulation in May 1883, which provided the redemption and retirement of national bank notes. No new banknotes could be issued during this time as there was an imbalance between existing coins and notes in regards to silver. Redeeming old paper currency was eventually effective at stabilizing the price of silver alloy. The Japanese government stablished a convertible bank note system by Dajo-kwan Notification No. 18 in May 1884. Concurrently, the amount of old paper currency in circulation decreased allowing the amount of silver reserves to grow. This drove up the value of paper currency until it was about equal to that of silver coins by the end of 1885. There is a disagreement among sources on the exact release date of the first Bank of Japan notes. Older sources give a date somewhere in "May 1885" with one source specifically pointing to May 9, 1885. Japan was eventually placed on a silver standard with laws enacted to issue silver for the notes starting in January 1886. The first five yen notes were issued concurrently or almost concurrently during this time on January 4, 1886 (year 19 of Meiji).

Five yen notes from this series are commonly called Ura Daikoku 5 yen (裏大黒5円) after the lucky god Daikokuten featured in the design. Officially they are referred to as former convertible banknotes (旧兌換銀行券) in relation to events that occurred since their release. (Note: The Bank of Japan no longer honors the obligation to convert yen into silver.) Five yen notes measure 87mm X 152mm in size and were designed by Italian engraver Edoardo Chiossone. Ura is used for naming these notes as Daikokuten is featured on the reverse side within a circle. The obverse meanwhile features the inscription NIPPON GINKO Promises to Pay the Bearer on Demand Five Yen in Silver with counterfeit penalties written in Kanji. Security features include a character watermark that reads "Bank of Japan Note" when held up to a light source. Five yen Daikoku notes were only printed for a few years due to problems involving the design. One of these defects involved the addition of "konjac powder" to increase the strength of the bill. This powder wound up attracting rats and insects which would easily damage the bills by chewing on them. Another issue had to due with the "blue ink" in the watermark that was used to prevent counterfeiting. The ink used was mixed with white lead as a pigment causing it to turn black when it reacted with hydrogen sulfide in hot spring areas. The Japanese government later adopted the gold standard on March 26, 1897, which switched over the redemption of Bank of Japan notes from silver to gold. Redemption of old silver coins for new gold coins at par began on October 1, 1897, and lasted until its closure on July 31, 1898. These notes continued to be redeemable in gold until September 1917, due to a gold embargo that lasted until January 1930. Five yen Daikoku notes were ultimately abolished on March 31, 1939 (year 14 of Shōwa) as a new convertible banking law came into effect.

=== Modified Convertible Banknotes (1888-1939) ===
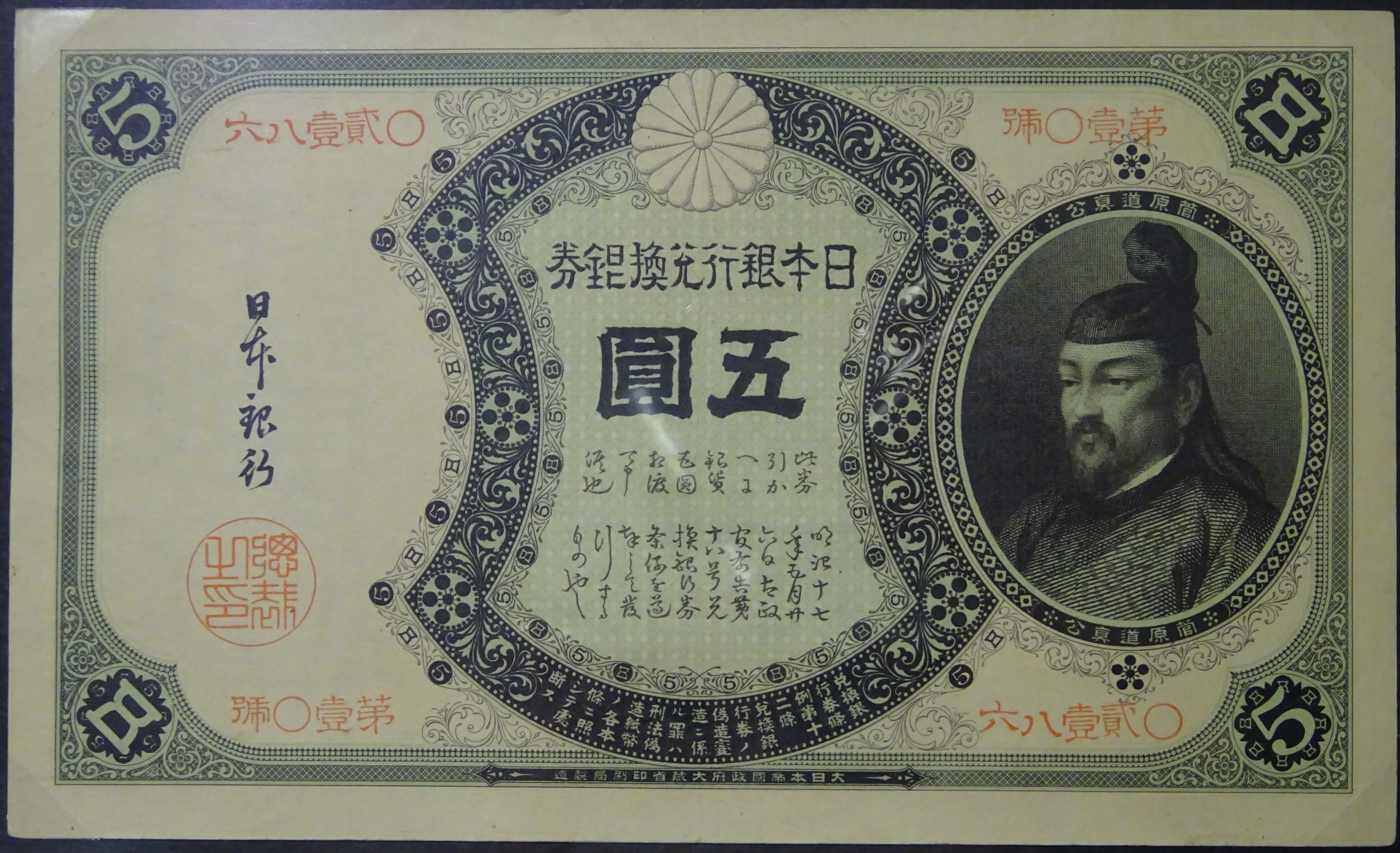
Five yen notes from this series have an obverse design feature resembling the shape of a fundō weight.

On December 3, 1888 (21st year of Meiji) the Bank of Japan printed new five yen silver certificates to replace the old "Daikokuten" notes. This action had to be undertaken to address design flaws which caused the latter series to be eaten and discolored. Modified five yen notes are commonly called weight 5 yen (分銅5円) in relation to their design. Officially they are referred to as former convertible banknotes (旧兌換銀行券) in relation to events that occurred since their release. Notes from this series all measure 95mm X 159mm in size, and feature Heian era scholar, poet, and politician Sugawara no Michizane on the obverse. The nickname weight is given to the design next to the portrait which resembles a fundō weight (分銅), which was used by merchants in the Edo period. The reverse side of the notes meanwhile feature convertible wording in English noting the notes redemption status for silver. Security features include character watermarks which read "Silver Standard Five Yen Bill" when held up to a light source. Originally these notes were intended to be silver certificates that could be converted through a bank transaction into silver coinage. Problems arose when foreign countries left the silver standard leading to a large increase in worldwide silver production. As the price of silver dropped the value of the silver yen went along with it causing inflation. An opportunity for change came in the aftermath of the First Sino-Japanese War as the Japanese government received a large compensation. This compensation was used to mint gold coins starting in October 1897 as the government switched from a silver standard to a gold standard. Redemption of old silver coins for new gold coins at par began on October 1, 1897, and lasted until its closure on July 31, 1898. Eventually another five yen series was issued in 1899 which reflected the transition from the silver standard to the gold standard. Weight five yen notes continued to be redeemable in gold until September 1917, due to a gold embargo that lasted until January 1930. They were ultimately abolished on March 31, 1939 (year 14 of Shōwa) as a new convertible banking law came into effect.

=== Chuo Notes (1899-1939) ===
When the Japanese government adopted the gold standard in 1897 all of the existing banknotes became convertible into gold. Five yen banknotes that reflected this change were printed two years later through an amendment to the convertible banknotes ordinance (1884). While these notes are officially called 5 Yen Convertible Banknote A (甲号兌換銀行券5円), they are more commonly referred to as Chuo Takeuchi 5 yen (中央武内5円) after their design. Five yen notes from this series measure 85mm X 146mm in size, and feature legendary Japanese hero-statesman Takenouchi no Sukune (Chuo Takeuchi) on the obverse. He is depicted in a central circle frame with counterfeit penalties below, and Ube shrine in the background. The reverse side of the note meanwhile has an orange tinted décor with convertible wording written in English. Security features include Foxglove flower watermarks to help aid against counterfeiting. Chuo five yen notes were issued on April 1, 1899 (32nd year of Meiji) shortly before the official retirement of the old government and national banknotes. There was a minor change made to later printed notes that is similar to modified one yen banknotes in regards to serial numbers. These were changed from traditional kanji symbols to Arabic numbers as all 47 characters of Iroha were used up. Chuo five yen notes were replaced by "Daikoku notes" in 1910 as advancements in photographic technology were developing rapidly. This in turn led to an increasing number of forgery cases where counterfeiters used photographs to copy banknotes. The notes were not invalidated as they continued to be redeemable in gold until September 1917, due to a gold embargo that lasted until January 1930. Chuo five yen notes were ultimately abolished on March 31, 1939 (year 14 of Shōwa) as a new convertible banking law came into effect.

=== Watermarked Daikokuten Notes (1910-1939) ===
Previous Chuo five yen notes were printed using anti-counterfeiting technology that eventually became outdated with advancements in photography. The Bank of Japan responded to this by issuing a new series with foreign "cutting-edge" technology. While these notes are officially called 5 Yen Convertible Banknote B (乙号兌換銀行券5円), they are more commonly referred to as Watermarked Daikokuten 5 yen (透かし大黒5円) after their design. Five yen notes from this series measure 78mm X 136mm in size, and feature Heian era scholar, poet, and politician Sugawara no Michizane on the obverse. The reverse side of the note meanwhile shows Kitano Tenmangū Shrine with convertible wording written in English. This particular series is known for its security features which include a special area that was intentionally left blank to place a Daikokuten watermark on. The practice of placing watermarks on banknotes was not a new invention at the time as it can be traced back to the Edo period. These five yen notes are different as they are the first Japanese banknotes to have the watermark enclosed in its own special designated area. Other security features include colored fibers that were squeezed into the paper for the green portrait of Sugawara no Michizane, and the complex pattern of Kitano Tenmangu on the reverse. Five yen notes were renewed in July 1910 which led to the release of Watermarked Daikokuten 5 yen on September 1 of that year. The series was not in circulation for long as the unpopular green and pale shades gave the portrait of Sugawara no Michizane an eerie ghost like appearance. This feature eventually gave them the nickname Yūrei bill (幽霊札) amongst the public. Due to their unpopularity the five yen note was redesigned and released in 1916 during the fifth year of the Taishō era. The old notes were not invalidated as they continued to be redeemable in gold until September 1917, due to a gold embargo that lasted until January 1930. Watermarked Daikokuten notes were ultimately abolished on March 31, 1939 (year 14 of Shōwa) as a new convertible banking law came into effect.

=== Taishō Takeuchi Notes (1916-1939) ===
When Emperor Meiji died in 1912, his son inherited the throne as Emperor Taishō. Five yen notes during this time were unpopular due to their design which caused the public to shun them. The decision to release a new series came during World War I, as there was now a demand for banknotes due to a booming economy. Five yen notes from this series are called Taishō Takeuchi 5 Yen (大正武内5円札) due to their era of printing and design. Notes from this series measure 73mm X 130mm in size, and feature legendary Japanese hero-statesman Takenouchi no Sukune (Chuo Takeuchi) on the obverse with Ube shrine. The reverse side of the note meanwhile has an Art Nouveau design with convertible wording written in English. Security features include a character watermark which reads "Bank of Japan" and a mesh pattern to help aid against counterfeiting. Taishō Takeuchi five yen were issued for circulation on December 15, 1916 (year 5 of Taishō) as convertible banknotes that could be exchanged for five yen in gold. This lasted for an undetermined period of time before the United States imposed a gold embargo on Japan in September 1917. The effects from the embargo caused gold coins to become "practically nonexistent" with transactions negotiated through banknotes. While five yen notes in theory could still be converted to gold, they were by all "practical purposes" made into inconvertible notes. The United States lifted the embargo in June 1919, but Japan continued it by importing gold heavily which re-enforced the gold reserve of the Bank of Japan. Government officials at the time had the opinion that no inflation could take place so long as the percentage of gold cover had not been lowered. This embargo was not absolute as it was recorded that some gold coins were paid out between 1920 and 1927 in very small amounts. Taishō Takeuchi five yen notes were ultimately impacted by the Shōwa financial crisis of 1927 (year 2 of Shōwa) which led to their expiration in February of that year. The gold embargo was later lifted in January 1930, only for it to be re-imposed on December 31, 1931. Converting gold was hence prohibited in principle as exporting the alloy required a national permit, and was virtually banned. Taishō Takeuchi notes were de jure abolished on March 31, 1939 (year 14 of Shōwa) as a new convertible banking law came into effect.

=== Primary Notes (1930-1946) ===
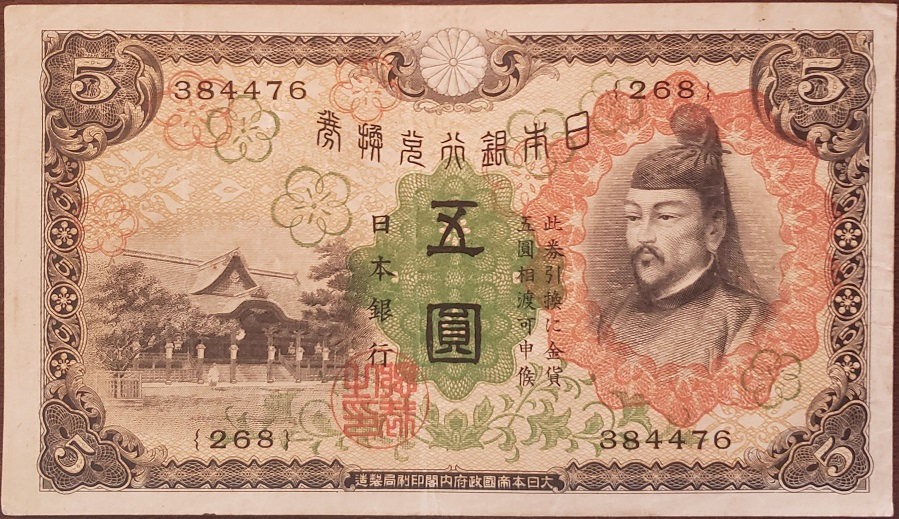
Five yen "Primary" note from 1930 (obverse)

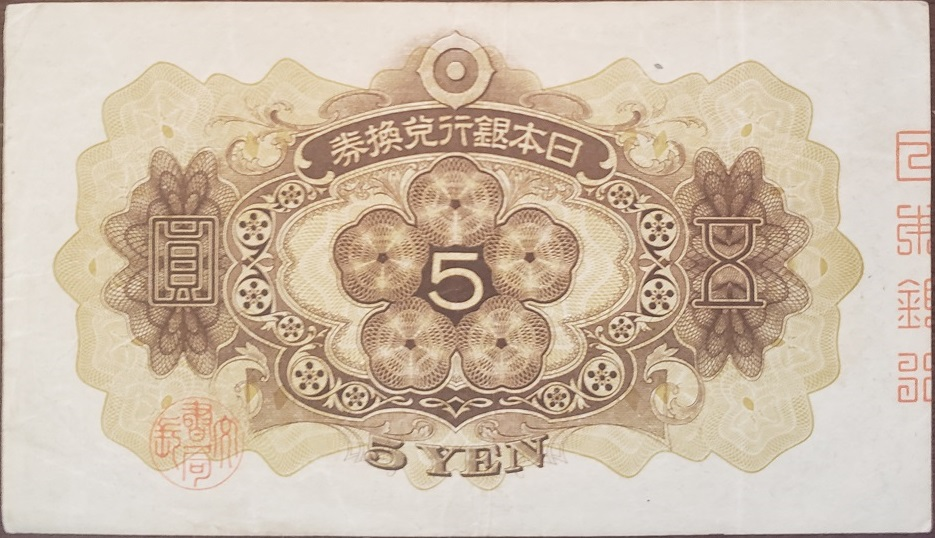
Five yen note from 1930 (reverse)

On March 1, 1930 (5th year of Shōwa) the Bank of Japan printed new five yen notes in response to the expiration of the old convertible five yen notes. These are known as Primary Five Yen (1次5円) as the next four series all have the same obverse design. Five yen notes from this series measure 76mm X 132mm in size, and feature Heian era scholar, poet, and politician Sugawara no Michizane on the obverse with Kitano Tenmangū. The reverse side of the note meanwhile has an ornate design with a colorized pattern. Security features include a plum blossom crest named after Sugawara no Michizane, and a character watermark "Go en" to help aid against counterfeiting. (Note: In Asian culture, the numbers "5" and "8" are considered to be good. "Go en 5 yen" (五円) is a Japanese homonym for "Go-en" (ご縁) meaning "honorable relationship".) When these were issued they acted as voucher or exchange notes for previous convertible notes that had expired. With the re-establishment of the gold standard, these "primary notes" were highly valued currency prized for their amount in gold. This exchange period did not last long as a gold embargo was re-imposed on December 31, 1931. The collapse of Japan's gold standard caused the value of these notes to plummet as exporting gold was now virtually banned. When the Second Sino-Japanese War broke out in 1937, these notes were brought into central and southern China by invading Japanese forces. The Japanese government intervened by withdrawing Bank of Japan notes from circulation in China, and replacing them military scrip to avoid any adverse effects. Features on five yen primary notes circulating in China during this time were initially crossed out with thick red lines. These lines were used to cancel the name "Bank of Japan" (日本銀行), and any text promising to pay the bearer in gold or silver. Large red text instead indicated that the note was military currency ("軍用手票") so as not to be confused with regular Japanese yen. The convertible wording, minister of finance's seal, and name "Bank of Japan" were eventually removed when the notes were officially issued as scrip.

When the "Bank of Japan Act" was promulgated on February 24, 1942, it allowed the Bank of Japan to be re-organized to reflect the reality of World War II. This act allowed "primary" five yen notes to be treated as fiat money, which was not guaranteed to be converted into gold and circulated with the credit of the government. When World War II ended towards the end of 1945, the Japanese economy was left in ruins. One of the major effects involved the amount of Bank of Japan notes in circulation as it caused rampant inflation to spread. In order to control the situation a process known as new yen switching (新円切替) was implemented by the Shidehara Cabinet. By March 9, 1946, it was reported by the International Monetary Fund that all notes previously issued by the Bank of Japan had been surrendered for a one to one conversion into new yen notes.

=== Secondary Notes (1942-1946) ===
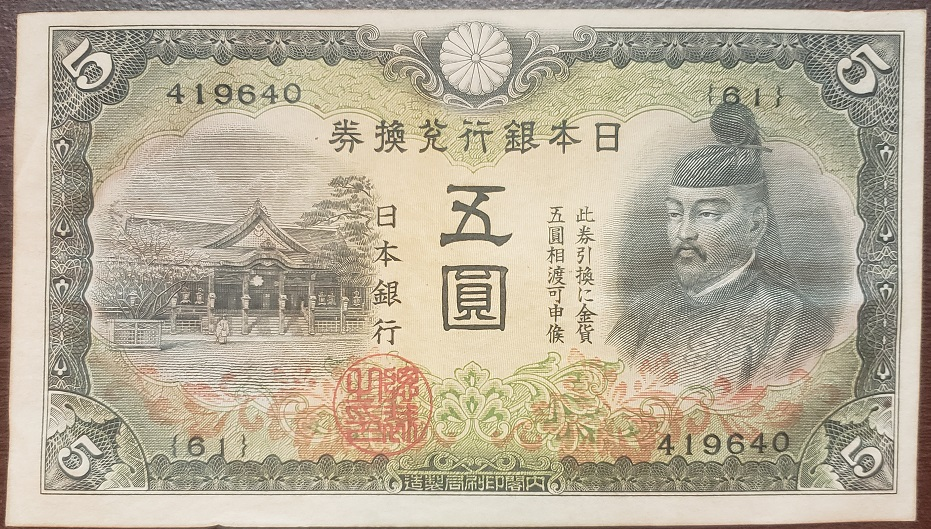
Five yen "secondary" note

It is commonly accepted that Japan started the Pacific War on December 7, 1941, with a surprise attack on Pearl Harbor. As the start of the war caused the National Printing Bureau to become extremely busy, it was difficult to save labor in manufacturing "primary" five yen notes. These issues caused another series to be created as a suitable in order to improve manufacturing efficiency. Five yen notes from this series are known as secondary 5 yen (2次5円) as this is the second out of four consecutive series with the same obverse design. These notes measure 76mm X 132mm in size, and feature Heian era scholar, poet, and politician Sugawara no Michizane on the obverse with Kitano Tenmangū. The reverse side of the note meanwhile has an ornate design with a colorized pattern with watermarks in the shape of birds to help aid against counterfeiting. When secondary five yen notes were issued on January 6, 1942, they were de jure exchangeable for gold. In reality the notes were de facto fiat currency that was made in preparation for a full-scale transition from the gold standard to a managed currency system. The "Bank of Japan Act" was later promulgated on February 24, 1942, which allowed the Bank of Japan to be re-organized to reflect the reality of World War II. As the convertible wording on the obverse no longer applied, the Bank of Japan released a new series of nonconvertible notes in denominations of 1, 5, 10, and eventually 100 yen as fiat currency. Secondary five yen eventually met the same fate as the previously issued primary five yen, as new yen switching (新円切替) was implemented by the Shidehara Cabinet after the war ended. By March 9, 1946, it was reported by the International Monetary Fund that all notes previously issued by the Bank of Japan had been surrendered for a one to one conversion into new yen notes.

=== First issue series (1943-1946) ===
The "Bank of Japan Act" empowered the Bank of Japan to release a replacement series of nonconvertible notes as fiat currency. These five yen notes are part of the First issue series (い号券), which is a collective term for notes issued after the Bank of Japan was re-organized in 1942. They are also known as 3rd Five Yen (3次5円) as this is the third out of four consecutive series with the same obverse design. Five yen notes from this series measure 76mm X 132mm in size, and feature Heian era scholar, poet, and politician Sugawara no Michizane on the obverse with Kitano Tenmangū. Notability, any previous mention of convertibility on the obverse was removed to reflect their new status as fiat currency. The reverse side of the note meanwhile has an ornate design with a colorized pattern. Security features were also added to the notes which include birds as watermarks to help aid against counterfeiting. First issue five yen notes were released into circulation on December 25, 1943 (18th year of Shōwa). Budget cuts in particular made in preparation for the war caused all of these notes to be manufactured in poor condition. Changes to production involved the simplification of printing, raw materials, and design patterns as personnel and materials were in short supply. The issuance of fiat currency was strongly criticized by the public at the time as the Japanese government abandoned its promise to convert paper money to gold. As the war intensified the Japanese government tried drastically to reduce costs by simplifying the notes even more. This effort created a second variety as the serial numbers were omitted on November 20, 1944 (year 19) to save labor in printing. Notes from the second variety are virtually identical to the ones issued in 1943 other than a missing serial number. These are also called 4th Five Yen (4次5円) as this is the fourth out of four consecutive series with the same obverse design. Non visible changes involved the printing of the symbols with the bank seals for efficiency. This series eventually met the same fate as the previously issued primary and secondary five yen notes, as new yen switching (新円切替) was implemented by the Shidehara Cabinet after the war ended. By March 9, 1946, it was reported by the International Monetary Fund that all notes previously issued by the Bank of Japan had been surrendered for a one to one conversion into new yen notes.

=== A series (1946-1955) ===
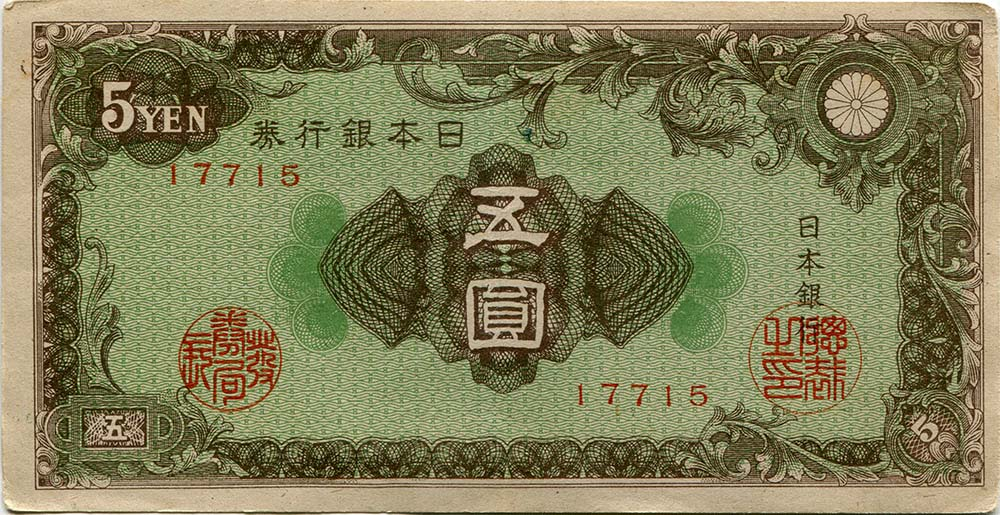
"A series" obverse

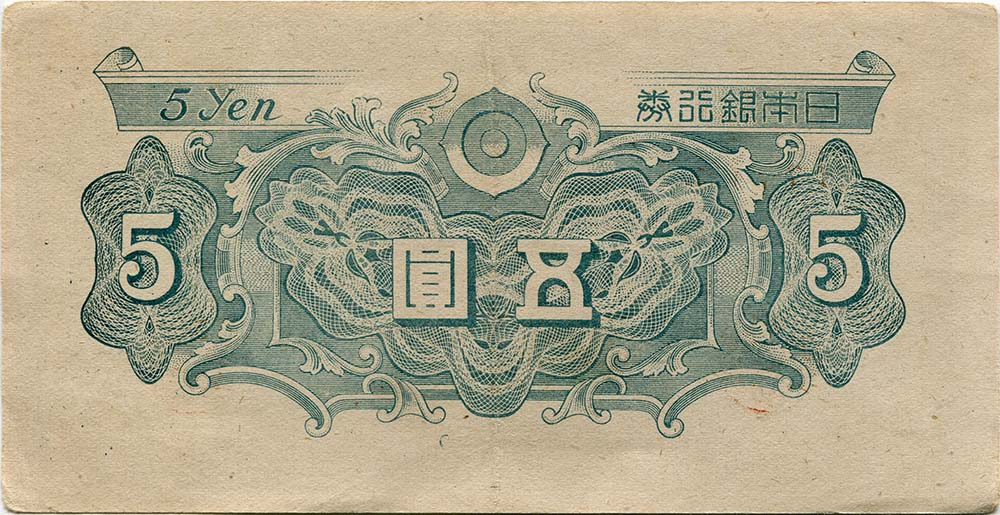
"A series" reverse

Notes from the "A series" (A号券) were the last denomination of "five yen" to be issued as paper currency in Japan. When World War II ended the amount of banknotes issued compared to before the war had more than tripled. This was due to factors such as wartime compensation, payment of retirement allowances to veterans, and refunds due to forced deposits and savings made during the war. All of these things had a negative effect on the Japanese economy due to rampant inflation and the devaluation of the yen. In order to control the situation a process known as new yen switching (新円切替) was implemented by the Shidehara Cabinet. The "A series" acted as renewal currency when banknotes were issued in denominations of 1, 5, 10, and 100 yen throughout 1946 (21st year of Shōwa). Five yen notes are also referred to as "Saibun 5-yen" (彩文5円) as both sides of the banknote feature a colorized pattern. This design had to be approved by the Supreme Commander for the Allied Powers (GHQ) before it was implemented for use. These notes were issued both by the Bank of Japan and the Japanese government in name only, as production and printing was outsourced to the private sector. By March 9, 1946, it was reported by the International Monetary Fund that all notes previously issued by the Bank of Japan had been surrendered for a one to one conversion into these new yen notes.

Five yen notes from the "A series" measure 68mm x 132mm in size and were poorly made due to post-war conditions. When the notes were released into circulation on March 5, 1946, they were prone to counterfeiting as there were no protective watermarks. To make matters worse, there were quality differences depending on where the notes were printed and produced which helped forgery to spread. The notes were not in circulation for long before Japanese coinage was reformed in 1948 (year 23) with the issue of a brass five-yen coin. Inflation was gradually stabilized by a monetary tightening policy called "Dodge Line", which was announced on March 7, 1949. Five yen notes from the "A series" finally suspended from issuance (de jure (Note: Five yen notes from the "A series" were only printed in 1946.)) on April 1, 1955 (year 30). Notes from the "A series" are still legal tender today as they are part of the "new yen" series established after World War II. They now remain unused in circulation as their collector's value exceeds their face value.

== Collecting ==
The value of any given banknote is determined by survivability rate and condition as collectors in general prefer original notes with bright rich coloring. In contrast to this are notes with ink stains, missing pieces, and evidence of repairs which can all impact their value. Exceptions to this include extremely rare banknotes where there are few surviving examples (ex: National Gold Bank Note). The oldest five yen notes include the Meiji Tsūhō series which were first issued in 1872 and later abolished in 1899. These were all made in Germany with a print run of 3,104,474 notes during their fifteen-year use in commerce. Notes from the five yen denomination are the most appraised banknotes of the Meiji Tsuho series, and are often found deteriorated as they were made abroad. These are now rare with examples priced in the multiple hundreds of thousands of yen for even the lowest collectible grades. (~$2,000+). The next series includes National banknotes which are broken down into the "old" and "new" varieties. Those in the former group are now extremely rare with the few surviving examples selling in the multiple millions of yen (~$10,000+ USD) on the Japanese market. Both of these varieties were actively collected by officials towards the end of 19th century in an effort to control rampant inflation. While the latter "new national banknotes" ("blacksmith notes") are more common, they are still rare with values in the tens of thousands of yen in average conditions. The final government series include five yen Modified "Jingū" Banknotes issued from 1881 to 1886. These are also popular as they are Japan's first portrait-filled banknote. "Jingū" five yen notes are scarcely valued in the hundreds of thousands of yen in average condition as they were not issued for a long period of time.

== See also ==
- Bank of Japan
- Banknotes of the Japanese yen
- Silver certificate (United States)
