= Meiji Tsuho =

Japanese government issued paper money

明治通宝 (Chinese); 明治通宝 (Japanese)

Unit
- Symbol: 圓 / 円 (Yen) (Note: The "圓" symbol is now obsolete in Japan.)

Denominations
- Subunit
- 1/100: 銭 (Sen)
- Banknotes: 10銭, 20銭, 50銭, 1円, 2円, 5円, 10円, 50円, 100円
- Coins: None

Demographics
- Date of introduction: 1872; 154 years ago
- Date of withdrawal: 1899
- User(s): Japan

Issuance
- Central bank: Imperial Japanese government
- This infobox shows the latest status before this currency was rendered obsolete.

Meiji Tsūhō (明治通宝) refers to the first western style paper currency that was issued by the Imperial Japanese government during the early Meiji era. After the "yen" was officially adopted in 1871, the Japanese looked to the Western world for their improved paper currency technology. An agreement was made with Italian engraver Edoardo Chiossone, who designed 6 denominations of Yen, and 3 denominations of Sen. (Note: At the time "Sen" was a sub-unit of "Yen". 100 bronze "Sen" coins equaled 1 gold or silver "Yen" coin.) The Japanese Government's decision to issue these notes as fiat currency played a large part in their demise as inflation rose following the Satsuma Rebellion. Meiji Tsūhō notes were phased out in favor of convertible notes issued by the Bank of Japan before they were demonetized towards the end of the 19th century.

== Background ==
During the Edo period, feudal domains issued their own scrip called hansatsu (藩札). While hansatsu supplemented the coinage of the Tokugawa shogunate, these notes were restricted to circulate within the domains that issued them. This was a problem in particular as the wide variety of miscellaneous paper currency that was issued by the public and private sectors confused the public. Counterfeiters took full advantage of the situation with "many forgeries committed" and a government that could do little to stop them. During the Meiji Restoration in 1868, the new government stepped in and tried to put an improved currency system into place. Their first attempt of a unified currency (that ultimately failed) was with Dajōkansatsu notes in denominations of "Rio", "Bu", and "Shu". As these notes proved to be unpopular, they were discredited by the public which caused their value to fall. The final straw came in 1870, when prime minister Matsukata Masayoshi took notice of a major incident involving a domain counterfeiting Dajōkansatsu notes 太政官札贋造事件. This was attributed to two major defects which included "imperfect manufacturing", and the poor materials that were used for the notes. Masayoshi came to the conclusion that modern paper currency should be introduced with the "yen".

== History ==
The first modern notes adopted and released by the Japanese government are part of a series known as Meiji Tsūhō (明治通宝). These notes were printed using western printing at Dondorf and Naumann, which was located in Frankfurt. Meiji Tsuho notes were designed by Edoardo Chiossone sometime in 1870 while he was working for Dondorf Naumann on behalf of The National Bank in the Kingdom of Italy. The process of making Chiossone's proposed design a reality started with the establishment of the "Imperial Printing Bureau of Japan" in 1871 (4th year of Meiji). In order to produce the currency the Japanese government reached out to Dondorf and Naumann to gain access to Western technology. Chiossone had a falling out with Italian Bank as his relationship with them had hit a breaking point. When the company suggested Chiossone for the role as engraver, he quickly accepted the offer. The production of money was handed over to the Imperial Printing Bureau in January 1872 when banknotes began to arrive from Germany. All of these arrivals were purposely left incomplete due to security reasons, as the words "Meiji Tsuho" and the mark of the Minister of Finance were added in Japan by the Imperial Printing Bureau. Dondorf and Naumann eventually sold their printing equipment to the Japanese government towards the end of 1873 (6th year of Meiji) due to financial issues. The original drawings of Meiji Tsuho were given to Japan in the following year, and engineers were hired for technical guidance. Production of Meiji Tsuho notes were this shifted to domestic production for the rest of their issuance. These notes feature an elaborate design that was difficult to forge at the time as counterfeiting was previously rampant with clan notes.

The elaborate design worked against counterfeiters for an unknown period of time before they found a way around it. Unstamped notes sent to Japan from Germany were legally obtained by these thieves. Normally Japanese officials would add stamps to the notes finalizing the process, where in this case the counterfeiters added their own stamps. Another major issue was the Satsuma Rebellion in February 1877, which helped lead to massive inflation due to the amount of inconvertible notes issued for payment. The Japanese government responded by halting the issuance of government notes in 1879 as a hopeful remedy to the situation. During this time legal tender Meiji Tsuho notes of all denominations had issues with paper quality, and were circulating with counterfeits. These problems led the Japanese government to issue redesigned banknotes in 1882 to replace the old Meiji Tsuho notes. Additional measures were subsequently put into place which included the establishment of a centralized bank known as the Bank of Japan. All of the remaining Meiji Tsuho notes in circulation that weren't already redeemed were to be retired in favor of either gold coinage or newly printed Bank of Japan notes. This period of exchange lapsed when Meiji Tsuho notes were abolished on December 9, 1899.

== Series overview ==
Value	Image	Issued	Size	Color (reverse)	Printed in Germany	Printed domestically (Japan)
10 sen		April 1872 (year 5 of Meiji)	87 mm x 53 mm	Green	72,026,143	54,621,137
20 sen		April 1872 (year 5 of Meiji)	87 mm x 53 mm	Blue	46,100,557	—N/a
Half yen		April 1872 (year 5 of Meiji)	87 mm x 53 mm	Brown	22,717,569	—N/a
1 yen		April 1872 (year 5 of Meiji)	113mm x 71mm	Blue	39,814,943	5,394,916
2 yen		June 25, 1872 (year 5 of Meiji)	111mm x 72 mm	Brown	2,695,298	9,792,989
5 yen		June 25, 1872 (year 5 of Meiji)	137mm x 89mm	Blue	3,104,474	—N/a
10 yen		June 25, 1872 (year 5 of Meiji)	137mm x 89mm	Lilac	1,143,189	1,546,063
50 yen		August 13, 1872 (year 5 of Meiji)	159mm x 107mm	Blue	23,261 (Note: These notes are extremely rare.)	—N/a
100 yen		August 13, 1872 (year 5 of Meiji)	159mm x 107mm	Red	24,330 (Note: These notes are extremely rare. At least 1 extant proof specimen is displayed at the Frankfurt Historical Museum.)	—N/a

== See also ==
- Scrip of Edo period Japan
- Japanese military currency (1894–1918)
- Korean yen
- Taiwanese yen
