= 2 yen note =

Denomination of Japanese yen

- Country: Japan
- Value: 2 Japanese yen
- Years of printing: 1872–1880 (Note: Non consecutive)

Obverse
- Design: Various designs depending on the series.

Reverse
- Design: Various designs depending on the series.

The 2 yen note (2円券) was a denomination of Japanese yen issued in two different overlapping series from 1872 to 1880 for use in commerce. Meiji Tsūhō "two yen" notes were the first to be released as inconvertible government notes in 1872. These notes were produced both domestically, and in Germany using western technology. While they had an elaborate design, the notes eventually suffered in paper quality, and were counterfeited. Two yen Meiji Tsūhō notes were not redesigned with other denominations in response to these issues. The series as a whole was affected by massive inflation that occurred during the aftermath of the Satsuma Rebellion in 1877. Too many non convertible notes had been issued to pay for the expenses incurred. Government notes stopped being issued in 1879, and the Bank of Japan was established in 1882 as a way to redeem old notes for new ones issued by the bank. This redemption period expired when the notes were abolished on December 9, 1899.

National bank notes were first issued in 1873, and circulated concurrently with Meiji Tsūhō notes. These were issued by a system of national banks that was adopted in design from the United States. Two yen national bank notes were convertible to gold coinage until 1876 when the price of the alloy rose. They eventually fell into the same situation as Meiji Tsūhō notes after the Satsuma Rebellion. National bank notes were suspended in 1880, and were also later eligible for redemption for Bank of Japan notes. The national banks themselves were replaced in 1896 by a law which also mandated abolishment of the notes after December 31, 1899. Both of these series are now bought and sold as collector's items depending on condition and series survival rate.

== Meiji Tsūhō (1872-1879) ==
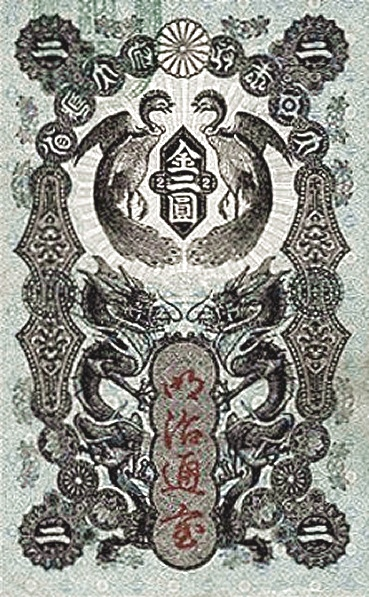
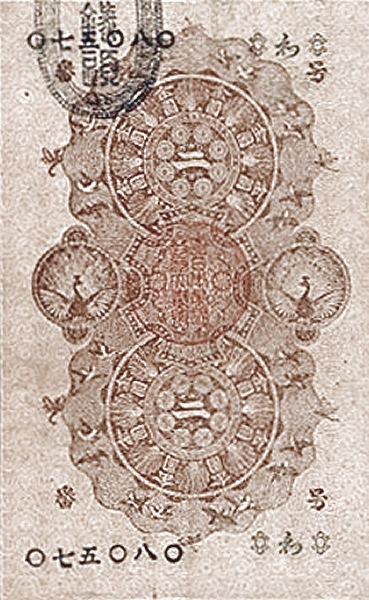
2 Yen "Meiji Tsūhō" note from 1872.

The first "two yen" notes adopted and released by the Japanese government are part of a series known as Meiji Tsūhō (明治通宝). These notes were the first Japanese currency ever to be printed using western printing at "Dondorf and Naumann", which was located in Frankfurt. Meiji Tsuho notes were designed by Edoardo Chiossone sometime in 1870 while he was working for Dondorf Naumann on behalf of The National Bank in the Kingdom of Italy. The process of making Chiossone's proposed design a reality started with the establishment of the "Imperial Printing Bureau of Japan" in 1871 (4th year of Meiji). In order to produce the currency the Japanese government reached out to Dondorf and Naumann to gain access to Western technology. Chiossone had a falling out with Italian Bank as his relationship with them had hit a breaking point. When the company suggested Chiossone for the role as engraver, he quickly accepted the offer. The production of money was handed over to the Imperial Printing Bureau in January 1872 when banknotes began to arrive from Germany. All of these arrivals were purposely left incomplete due to security reasons, as the words "Meiji Tsuho" and the mark of the Minister of Finance were added by the Imperial Printing Bureau. Woodblock printing was eventually employed to save hundreds of people the work of handwriting the characters "Meiji Tsuho" on each individual note. Two yen notes in particular were released in June 1872 (year 5) measuring 111mm x 72 mm in size. These notes feature an elaborate design that was difficult to forge at the time as counterfeiting was previously rampant with clan notes. Eventually enough Western technology was brought over to Japan as the Japanese government produced some two yen Meiji Tsūhō notes domestically. The elaborate design worked against counterfeiters for an unknown period of time before they found a way around it. Unstamped notes sent to Japan from Germany were legally obtained by these thieves. Normally Japanese officials would add stamps to the notes finalizing the process, where in this case the counterfeiters added their own stamps. Another major issue was the Satsuma Rebellion in February 1877, which helped lead to massive inflation due to the amount of inconvertible notes issued for payment. The Japanese government responded by stopping the issuance of government notes in 1879 as a hopeful remedy to the situation. During this time legal tender Meiji Tsuho two yen notes had issues with paper quality, and were circulating with counterfeits. While these problems led the Japanese government to issue redesigned banknotes in 1881, two yen notes were excluded from this process. Additional measures were subsequently put into place which included the establishment of a centralized bank known as the Bank of Japan. All of the remaining Meiji Tsuho notes in circulation that weren't already redeemed were to be retired in favor of either silver coinage or newly printed Bank of Japan notes. This period of exchange lapsed when Meiji Tsuho notes were abolished on December 9, 1899.

== National Bank Notes (1873-1880) ==
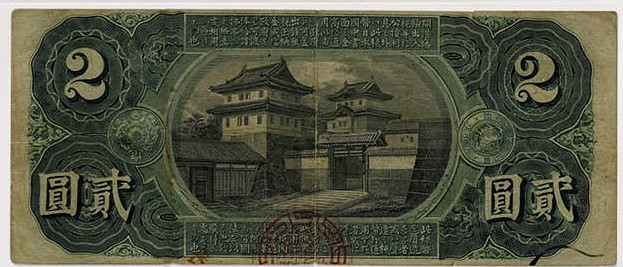
Reverse side of a 2 yen "old national banknote". (Note: Note the similarities between this note and National Bank Notes issued by the United States.)

The idea for national bank notes (国立銀行紙幣) in Japan came from Itō Hirobumi when he was studying the United States in 1871. During this time the Meiji government was working to establish a gold-backed monetary system based on Hirobumi's recommendation. The Japanese government accepted Hirobumi's proposal for national bank notes in 1872 by establishing the "National Bank Act" which organized a decentralized "U.S.-style" system of national banks. Each of these banks was chartered by the state to issue notes exchangeable for gold from reserves held by the banks. Permission was eventually given to these private banks allowing national bank notes to be issued in August 1873. The first bank notes issued are also referred to as old national bank notes (旧国立銀行券). Two yen national bank notes in particular measure 80 mm x 190 mm in size, and are modeled after their counterparts in the United States. The obverse features clan leaders Nitta Yoshisada and Kojima Takanori with bank seals, while the reverse depicts the Tokyo Imperial Palace. These circulated as convertible notes for roughly three years before the rising price of gold became an issue. As a response, an amendment to the National Bank Act was adopted in August 1876 making the notes inconvertible. Under this amendment there was no limit on the amount of paper money that could be issued. This action also allowed private banks to redeem national bank notes for government issued inconvertible Meiji Tsuho notes rather than for gold. Negative effects from this amendment in the form of inflation were greatly amplified by the Satsuma Rebellion in February 1877. While the rebellion was quickly resolved, the Japanese government had to print a large amount of fiat notes as payment. As two yen notes were never printed as fiat notes, they continued to circulate while a series of events changed Japan's banking system. In July 1877 then prime minister Ōkuma Shigenobu realized that keeping Japan on a gold standard was pointless given the low price of silver. The silver one yen coin was thus brought into domestic commerce on May 27, 1878, switching Japan to a de facto silver standard. This did little good for fiat currency as it continued to lose its value against silver coinage. The issuance of national bank notes was ultimately suspended in 1880 by then prime minister Matsukata Masayoshi.

During this time Matsukata introduced a policy of fiscal restraint that resulted in what has come to be called the "Matsukata Deflation". The most significant of these policies established a centralized banking system through the "Bank of Japan Regulation" on June 27, 1882, by proclamation No. 32. In order to decrease inflation all of the old notes were to be collected and exchanged by notes from the central bank. The first step of this process came with an amendment to the regulation in May 1883, which provided the redemption and retirement of national bank notes. As the amount of paper currency in circulation decreased, the amount of silver reserves increased. This drove up the value of paper currency until it was about equal to that of silver coins by the end of 1885. The National Bank Act was amended again in March 1896, providing for the dissolution of the national banks on the expiration of their charters. This amendment also prohibited national bank notes from circulating after December 31, 1899. The ongoing redemption process took additional time as national bank notes were not fully removed from circulation until 1904.

== Collecting ==
The value of any given banknote is determined by survivability rate and condition as collectors in general prefer original notes with bright rich coloring. In contrast to this are notes with ink stains, missing pieces, and evidence of repairs which can all impact their value. Exceptions to this include extremely rare banknotes where there are few surviving examples (ex: National Gold Bank Note). The oldest fifty sen notes (a.k.a. half yen notes) include the Meiji Tsūhō series which were first issued in 1872 and later abolished in 1899. Their print run includes 2,695,298 notes made in Germany, and 9,792,989 made in Japan. More of these notes are in better condition than one yen notes of the same series as more were made domestically. While the survivability rate is high, the value of these notes in average condition is still substantial with prices in the multiple tens of thousands of yen (~$400+ USD). Professional grading is recommended for this series as "many" counterfeit notes exist on the market. The only other series of two yen include national bank notes which are now rare due to events surrounding the aftermath of the Satsuma Rebellion. In order to pay for this event a large amount of banknotes were printed and released into circulation as a way to ease the economic situation. This wound up having a negative effect in the form of rampant inflation which caused national bank notes to be actively collected by officials. These are now popular banknotes among collectors which are rarely seen on the marketplace. When they are up for the sale, two yen national bank notes sell in the multiple hundreds of thousands of yen (~$5,000+ USD) in average condition.

== See also ==
- Banknotes of the Japanese yen
- Bank of Japan
