= Japanese military currency (1894–1918) =

日本軍用手票 (in Chinese and Japanese)

Units of account
- Symbol: 圓 (Yen)
- Subunit
- 1/100: 錢 (Sen)

Denominations
- Banknotes: 10 sen, 20 sen, 50 sen, 1圓, 5圓, 10圓
- Coins: None

Demographics
- User(s): Japanese Korea, Republic of China, Russian State

Issuance
- Central bank: Ministry of War of Japan
- This infobox shows the latest status before this currency was rendered obsolete.

Japanese military currency (日本軍用手票) is the name given to money used by the Japanese armed forces for the purchase of supplies in occupied territories. It was mainly issued in denominations of yen, and subsidiary currency of sen with the exception of the first Sino-Japanese War series. This particular article covers pre-Shōwa era currency issued from 1894 to 1918 in three different periods. During this time Japan was militarily involved in the First Sino-Japanese War, Russo-Japanese War, and events during World War I such as the Siberian intervention. The military currency issued during these events circulated in Japanese Korea, the Republic of China (Manchuria), and the Russian State. All of the notes issued share a similar design which resembles government issued civilian currency which circulated in Japan from 1872 to 1899. Japanese military currency was exchangeable at the given time for both silver and gold bullion. Most of these events were not long term which impacted the amount of surviving currency in different ways. It was also routine after each event for officials to exchange the military currency issued for bullion or other forms of payment such as banknotes. Unredeemed notes were thus either held by the public as commemorates or eventually lost in the decades that followed. Those that remain today are collected and traded depending on the condition and surviving rate of the series.

== First Sino-Japanese War (1895) ==
Sino-Japanese Warbonds (日清戦争軍票) were the first currency issued by the Japanese armed forces. The notes were used during the First Sino-Japanese War for only two months as the war ended before they could be used for a longer term. Sino-Japanese Warbonds were printed and released sometime in February 1895 in denominations of 10 tael, 5 tael, 1 tael, 5 sen, 2 sen, and 1 fen. Their design is similar to civilian issued Meiji Tsūhō notes which were in circulation at the time. As the war ended with a peace treaty on April 17, 1895, a majority of the series went unused. Most of these notes were collected by officials who exchanged them at a 1.40 yen per 1 tael rate before disposing of them. The issued series as a whole was thought to have gone extinct until four notes re-surfaced in 1977. These were found hidden in the inner pockets of military uniforms worn by high-ranking officers who served in the Sino-Japanese War. Five other unissued specimen notes remain at the Bank of Japan currency museum for public viewing.

== Russo-Japanese War (1904) ==
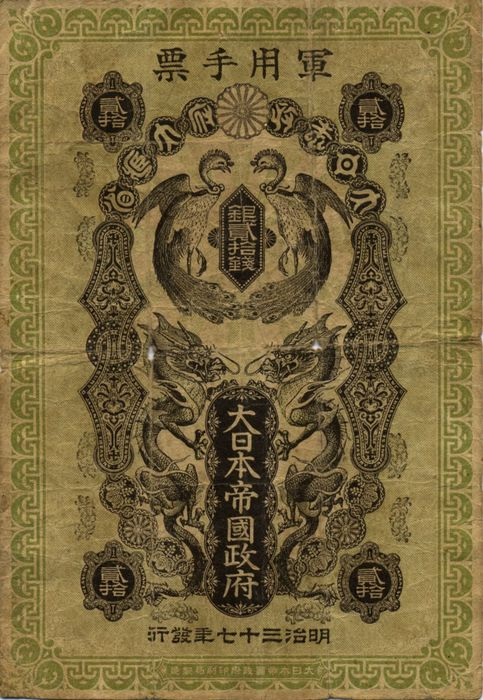
20 sen note (obverse) from 1904 (year 37 of Meiji)

Russo-Japanese War military bonds (日露戦争軍票) were produced beforehand in 1903 (year 36 of Meiji) in anticipation of an upcoming war. During this time negotiations commenced between Japan and Russia regarding Russian troops in Manchuria. Seeing Russia as a rival, Japan offered to recognize Russian dominance in Manchuria in exchange for recognition of Korea being within the Japanese sphere of influence. Russia refused and demanded the establishment of a neutral buffer zone between Russia and Japan in Korea north of the 39th parallel. Japan officially issued a declaration of war on February 8, 1904, and attacked the Russian Far East Fleet at Port Arthur. Russo-Japanese War military bonds were issued upon declaration in denominations of 10 sen, 20 sen, 50 sen, 1 yen, 5 yen, and 10 yen. Their size ranges from 103mm x 62mm for sen to 130 mm x 92 mm for yen with a design similar to Meiji Tsūhō notes that were issued for civilians in Japan from 1872 to 1899. These Russo-Japanese War military bonds could be converted into silver during the war. Places of redemption were set up across Manchuria as the alloy could not be feasibly carried by the troops making local payments. This series was used abundantly in contrast with Sino-Japanese Warbonds as over 140 million yen in notes were issued during the war. The Japanese military also issued some of these notes in the Korean Empire as "special occupation currency".

The Treaty of Portsmouth formally ended the Russo-Japanese War on September 5, 1905. As Russo-Japanese War military bonds were not permitted to circulate in Japan, they "obtained wide currency" in Korea and Manchuria. When the war ended, the Yokohama Specie Bank was authorized to redeem the military notes in exchange for their own notes backed by the silver yen. Additional arrangements were also made to convert the notes into gold in order to target Japanese merchants in Manchuria. The exchange process began in 1910 which allowed Bank of Japan and eventually Bank of Chōsen notes to circulate in the region. Gold certificates were exclusively issued by the latter of these two banks by 1917, but were not popular with the Chinese who preferred silver. Russo-Japanese War military bonds meanwhile continued to circulate until at least 1919 with 300,000 yen reported in circulation. The note exchangements eventually gave rise to Japanese yen silver currency in Manchuria which was used into the 1930s. While "many" of the war notes were collected and destroyed by the government, others chose to keep them as victory commemorates.

== World War I (1914–1918) ==
=== Qingdao troops ===
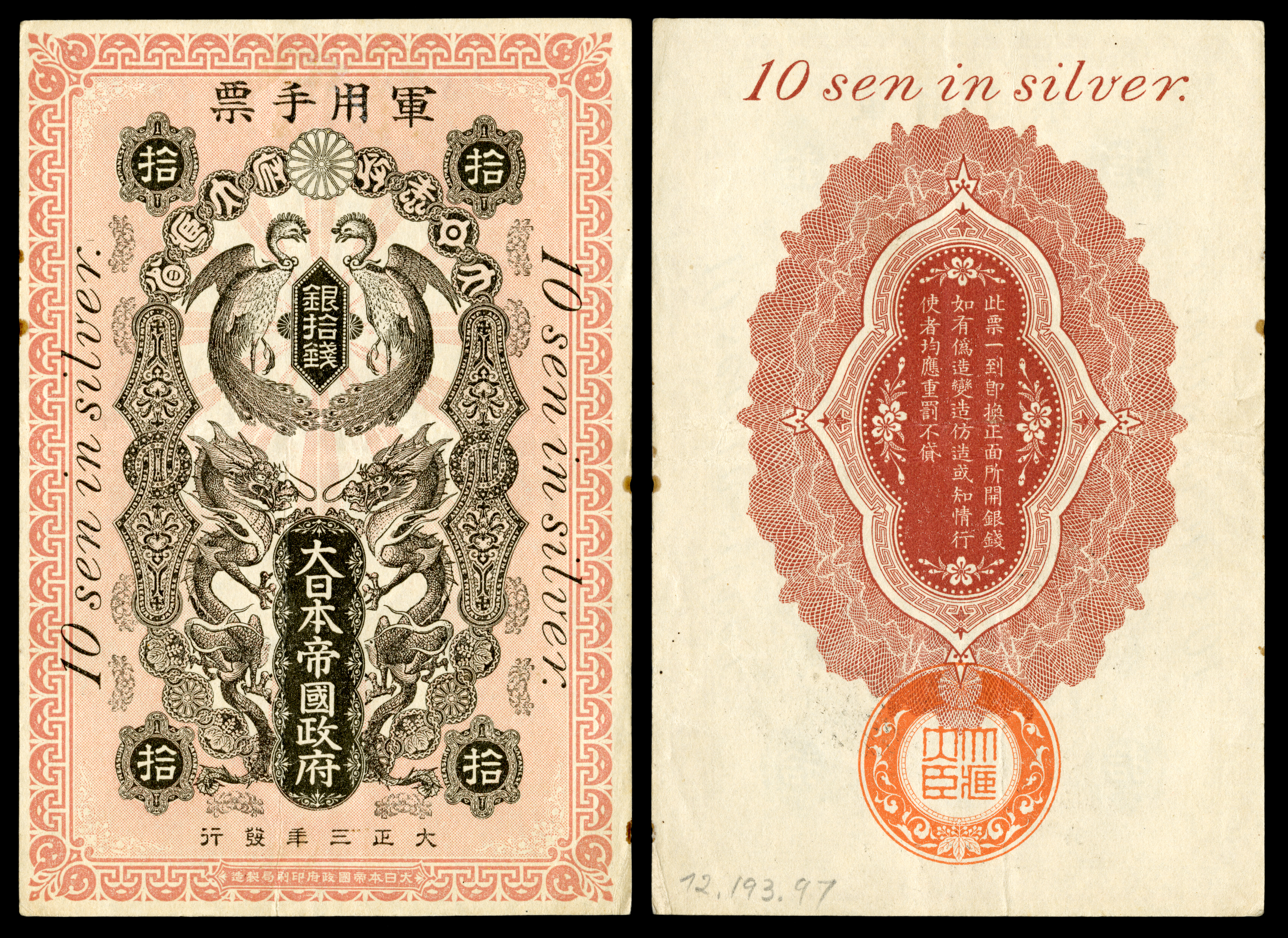
10 sen "Qingdao" note

Qingdao military bonds (青島出兵軍票) were issued for a very short period of time in 1914 as part of the Siege of Tsingtao. Japan had declared war on Germany during World War I and sent troops to Tsingtao (now Qingdao) as it was being used as a port. Qingdao military bonds were issued in September 1914 (year 3 of Taishō) in denominations of 10 sen, 20 sen, 50 sen, 1 yen, 5 yen, and 10 yen which were redeemable in silver. The notes vary in size from 103mm x 70mm for denominations of sen, to 133 mm x 93 mm for denominations of yen. Some of the lower denomination notes were re-printed on repurposed Russo-Japanese War warbonds. Qingdao military bonds have a design similar to other war currency of the time as they are all similar to Meiji Tsūhō notes that were issued for civilians in Japan from 1872 to 1899. Noticeable differences in this particular design include "(x denomination) in silver" printed in English on both sides of the obverse, and once on the reverse. The amount of issued notes is "small" as the siege of Qingdao was settled in less than two months after they were first issued. Most of these notes were redeemed by 1922 (year 11 of Taishō) as the Japanese government replaced them with Yokohama Specie Bank issued civilian currency. The uncollected amount of notes is estimated to be around 160,000 yen.

=== Siberian intervention ===
The final military currency issued before the Shōwa era is referred to as Siberian Intervention Warbonds (シベリア出兵軍票). Towards the end of World War I Japan sent troops to support the allied intervention in Siberia against Soviet Russia and its allies during the Russian Civil War. Gold backed banknotes issued by the Russian government were widely accepted in Siberia and Manchuria before the start of World War I. When the October Revolution caused the Russian monetary system to become chaotic the Japanese looked for ways to exploit the situation by releasing their own currency in the regions. The Japanese government decided in July 1918 that military payments should be made through the Bank of Chōsen using banknotes or gold backed military notes These notes were backed by 10,000 yen in gold coins as military funds given for the duration of the event. Siberian Intervention Warbonds were issued in August 1918 when the event commenced in denominations of 10 sen, 20 sen, 50 sen, 1 yen, 5 yen, and 10 yen. Their size ranges from 109mm x 76mm for sen to 135 mm x 95 mm for yen with a design similar to Meiji Tsūhō notes that were issued for civilians in Japan from 1872 to 1899. The face value of these notes is written twice in both Japanese and Russian on the obverse side to reflect issuance in the regions involved. These notes circulated for a long duration as the Imperial Japanese Army continued to occupy Siberia even after other Allied forces withdrew in 1920. Siberian Intervention Warbonds were actively collected by the Japanese government when soldiers returned from the intervention in October 1922. Those that weren't collected remained in circulation as convertible banknotes that could be exchanged for Bank of Japan notes of the same value. This period of exchange lasted until September 1945 when the Ministry of Finance declared the military bonds invalid.

== Collecting ==
The value of any given banknote is determined by survivability rate and condition as collectors in general prefer original notes with bright rich coloring. In contrast to this are notes with ink stains, missing pieces, and evidence of repairs which can all impact their value. Exceptions to this include extremely rare banknotes where there are few surviving examples (ex: National Gold Bank Note). The oldest military currency issued during the post-Imperial restoration era include Sino-Japanese Warbonds which had a very short lifespan. These notes are not collectible as there are no records of actual sales outside of institutions such as the Bank of Japan Currency Museum. One the four known "1 tael" notes held by the museum was assessed on April 18, 2020, for 4,000,000 yen (~$35,000+ USD). The second series issued during the Russo-Japanese War is very common as over 140 million yen in notes were issued for the duration. Russo-Japanese War military bonds continued to circulate long after being collected until at least 1919 with people keeping them as victory commemorates. These notes were produced with and without serial numbers which creates two varieties to those looking for a set. On average they are valued in the tens of thousands of yen (~$100+ USD) depending on the denomination. The highest denomination notes of 5 and 10 yen are rare, and are valued much higher in the hundreds of thousands of yen (~$1,000+ USD).

During World War I Japan issued two different series of military currency for events in China and Siberia. The first of these issues are known as Qingdao military bonds which are now scarce due to their survival rate. As with the First Sino-Japanese War, the incident involving the Siege of Tsingtao only lasted for a brief period of time. Most of the issue was either redeemed afterwards or lost over the past century. Notes in the lower denominations are most common with values ranging from the tens to hundreds of thousands of yen. The highest denomination notes of 5 and 10 yen are possibly non-existent now as there have been no recorded sales of them. Siberian Intervention Warbonds were the second and last of these currencies issued before the Shōwa era. Grading services also refer to these notes as part of the Occupation of Siberia series for an encapsulation title. This series follows the pattern of the lowest denominations being the easiest to obtain, as they are valued in the tens to hundreds of thousands of yen. The surviving notes for the highest denominations of 5 and 10 yen are now very rare, with values in the hundreds of thousands to millions of yen. An example of a 10 yen note sold for US$28,680 at an auction held in 2017.

== See also ==
- Banknotes of the Japanese yen
- Scrip of Edo period Japan
