= Climate of Japan =

A Köppen climate classification map of Japan

Most regions of Japan, such as Honshu, Shikoku, and Kyushu, belong to the temperate zone with humid subtropical climate (Köppen climate classification Cfa) characterized by four distinct seasons. However, its climate varies from cold humid continental climate (Köppen climate classification Dfb) in the north such as northern Hokkaido, to warm tropical rainforest climate (Köppen climate classification Af) in the south such as the Yaeyama Islands and Minami-Tori-shima.

== Climate zones of Japan ==
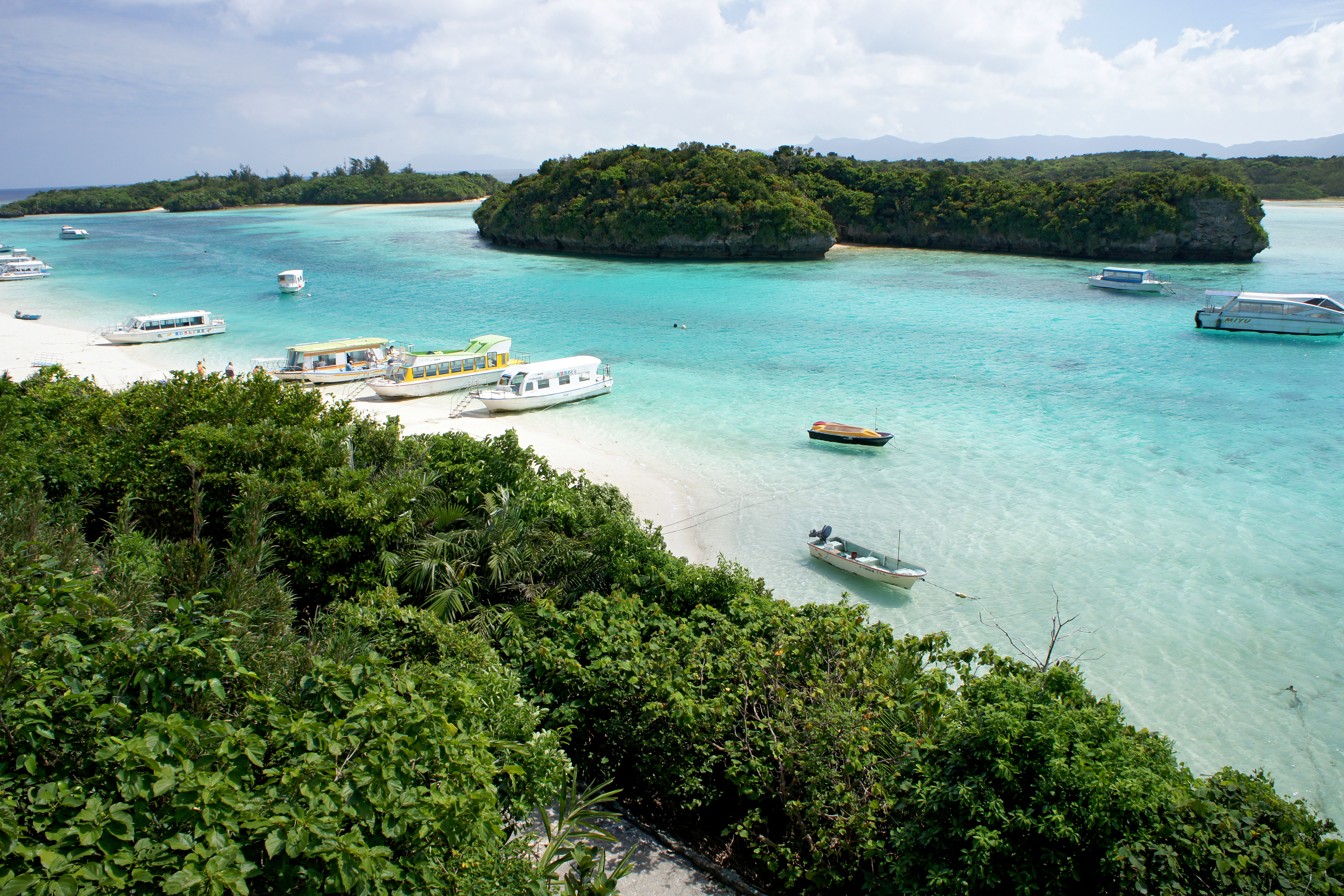
Kabira Bay on Ishigaki Island, Okinawa Prefecture in March

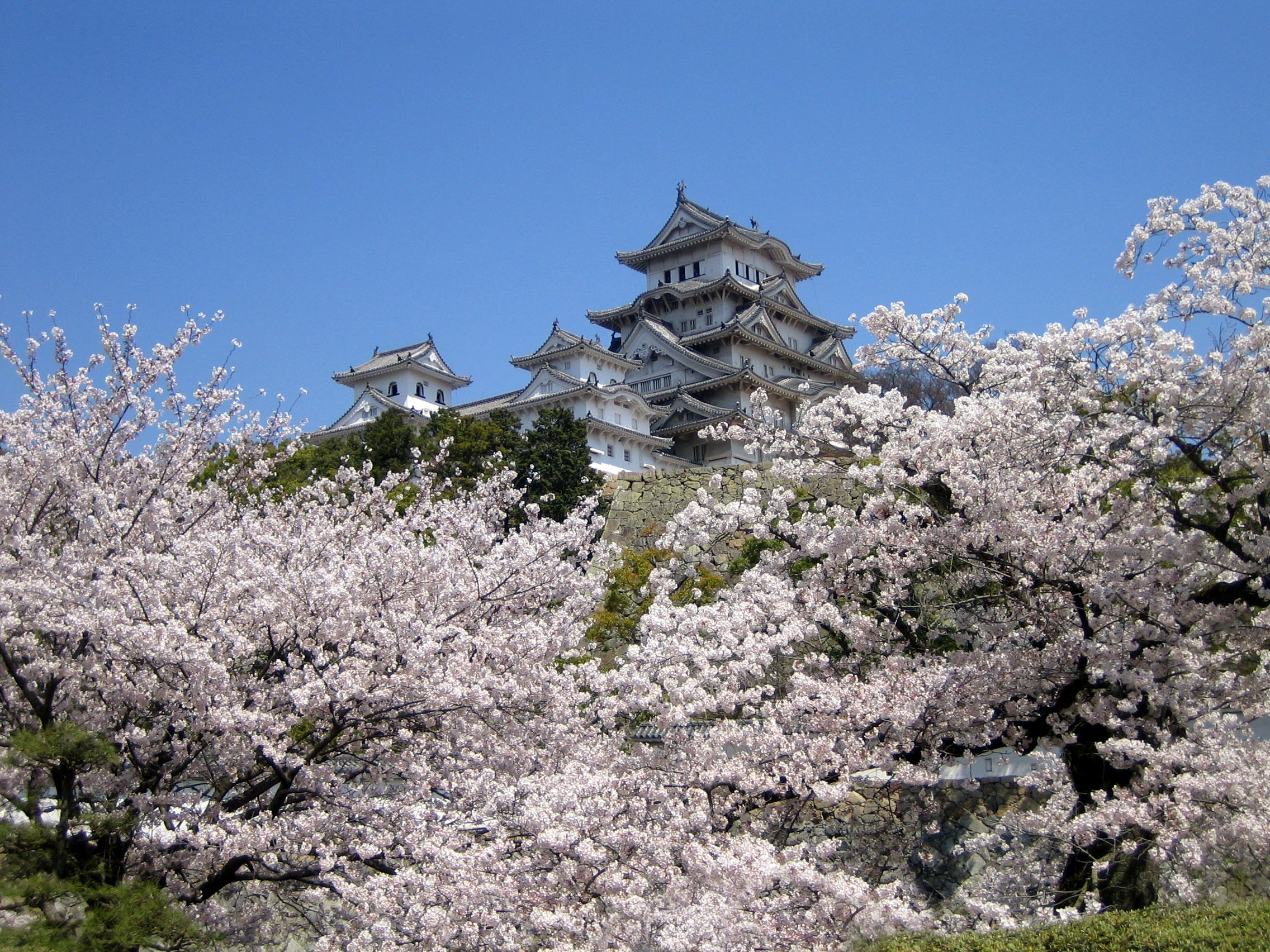
Sakura blossoms with Himeji Castle in Hyōgo Prefecture in April

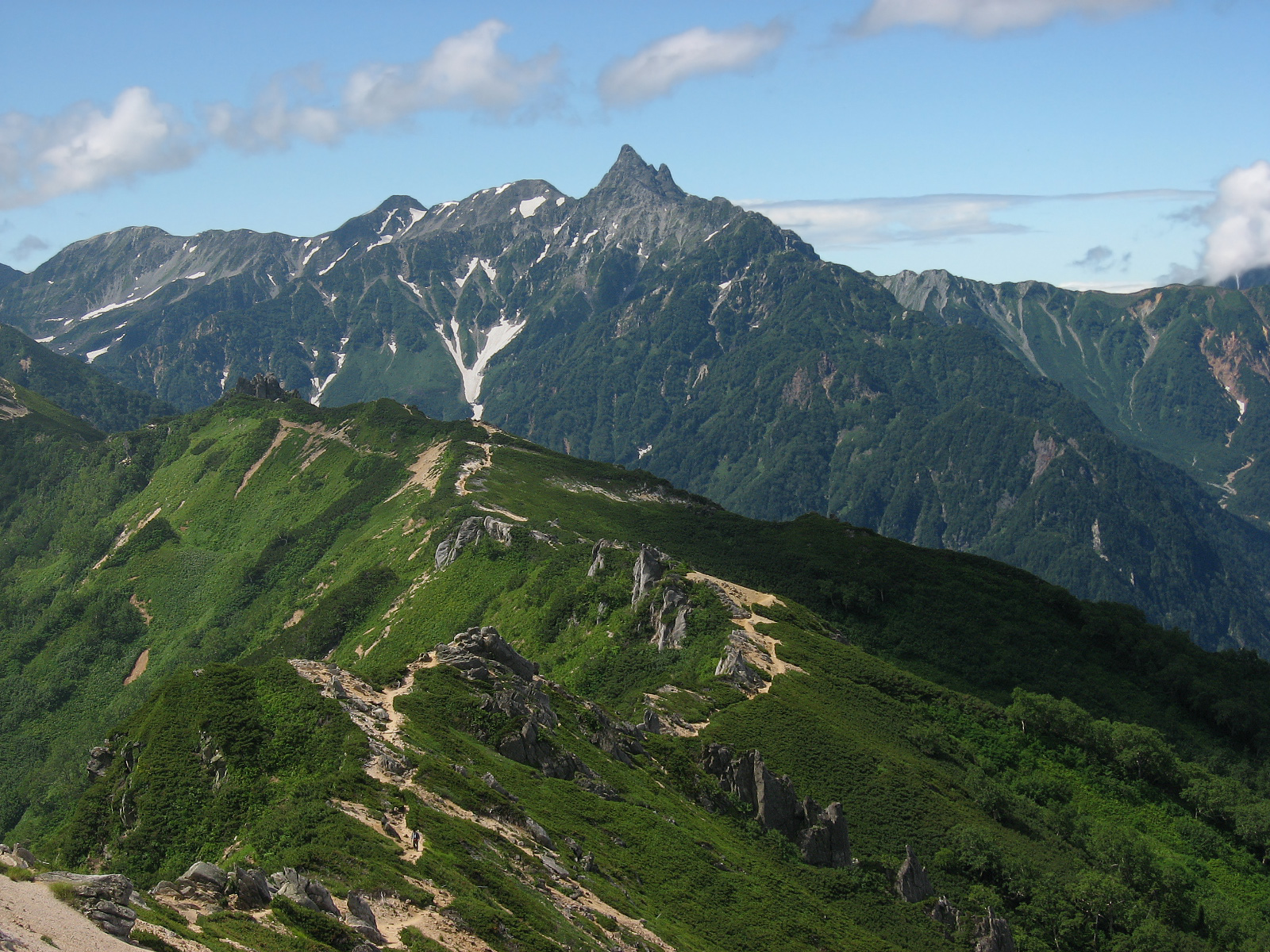
Mount Yari, Nagano Prefecture in August

Japan's varied geographical features divide it into six principal climatic zones.

- Hokkaido belongs to the humid continental climate, with long, very cold winters and warm, cool summers. Precipitation is sparse; however, winter brings large snowfalls of hundreds of inches in areas such as Sapporo and Asahikawa.
- In the Sea of Japan, the northwest seasonal wind in winter gives heavy snowfall, which south of Tōhoku mostly melts before the beginning of spring. In summer, it is a little less rainy than the Pacific area but sometimes experiences extreme high temperatures because of the foehn wind phenomenon.
- Central Highland: a typical inland climate gives large temperature variations between summers and winters and between days and nights. Precipitation is lower than on the coast because of rain shadow effects.
- Seto Inland Sea: the mountains in the Chūgoku and Shikoku regions block the seasonal winds and bring mild climate and many fine days throughout the year.
- Pacific Ocean: the climate varies greatly between the north and the south, but generally winters are significantly milder and sunnier than those of the side that faces the Sea of Japan. Summers are hot because of the southeast seasonal wind. Precipitation is very heavy in the south and heavy in the summer in the north. The climate of the Ogasawara Islands ranges from a humid subtropical climate (Köppen climate classification Cfa) to tropical savanna climate (Köppen climate classification Aw) with temperatures being warm to hot all year round.
- The climate of the Ryukyu Islands ranges from a humid subtropical climate (Köppen climate classification Cfa) in the north to a tropical rainforest climate (Köppen climate classification Af) in the south with warm winters and hot summers. Precipitation is very high and is especially affected by the rainy season and typhoons.

== Precipitation of Japan ==
Japan is generally a rainy country with high humidity. Because of its wide range of latitude, seasonal winds and different types of ocean currents,{} Japan has a variety of climates, with a latitude range of the inhabited islands from 24°N – 46°N, which is comparable to the range between Nova Scotia and The Bahamas in the east coast of North America. Tokyo is between 35°N – 36°N, which is comparable to that of Tehran, Charlotte, or Las Vegas.

As Mount Fuji and the Japanese coastal Alps provide a rain shadow, Nagano and Yamanashi Prefectures receive the least precipitation in Honshu, though it still exceeds 900 millimetres (35 in) annually. A similar effect is found in Hokkaido, where Okhotsk Subprefecture receives as little as 750 millimetres (30 in) per year. All other prefectures have coasts on the Pacific Ocean, Sea of Japan, and Seto Inland Sea, or have a body of salt water connected to them. Two prefectures—Hokkaido and Okinawa—are composed entirely of islands.

== Seasons in Japan ==
=== Summer ===
The climate from June to September is marked by hot, wet weather brought by tropical airflows from the Pacific Ocean and Southeast Asia. These air flows are full of moisture and deposit substantial amounts of rain when they reach land. There is a marked rainy season, beginning in early June and continuing for about a month. It is followed by hot, sticky weather. Five or six typhoons pass over or near Japan every year from early August to early October, sometimes resulting in significant damage. Annual precipitation averages between 1,000 and 2,500 mm (40 and 100 in) except for the areas such as Kii Peninsula and Yakushima Island which is Japan's wettest place with the annual precipitation is one of the world's highest at 4,000 to 10,000 mm.

Maximum precipitation, like the rest of East Asia, occurs in the summer months except on the Sea of Japan coast where strong northerly winds produce a maximum in late autumn and early winter. Except for a few sheltered inland valleys during December and January, precipitation in Japan is above 25 millimetres (1 in) of rainfall equivalent in all months of the year, and in the wettest coastal areas it is above 100 millimetres (4 in) per month throughout the year.

Mid-June to mid-July is generally the rainy season in Honshu, Shikoku, and Kyushu, excluding Hokkaidō since the seasonal rain front or tsuyu zensen (梅雨前線) dissipates in northern Honshu before reaching Hokkaido. In Okinawa, the rainy season starts early in May and continues until mid-June. Unlike the rainy season in mainland Japan, it rains neither every day nor all day long during the rainy season in Okinawa. Between July and October, typhoons, grown from tropical depressions generated near the equator, can attack Japan with furious rainstorms.

=== Winter ===
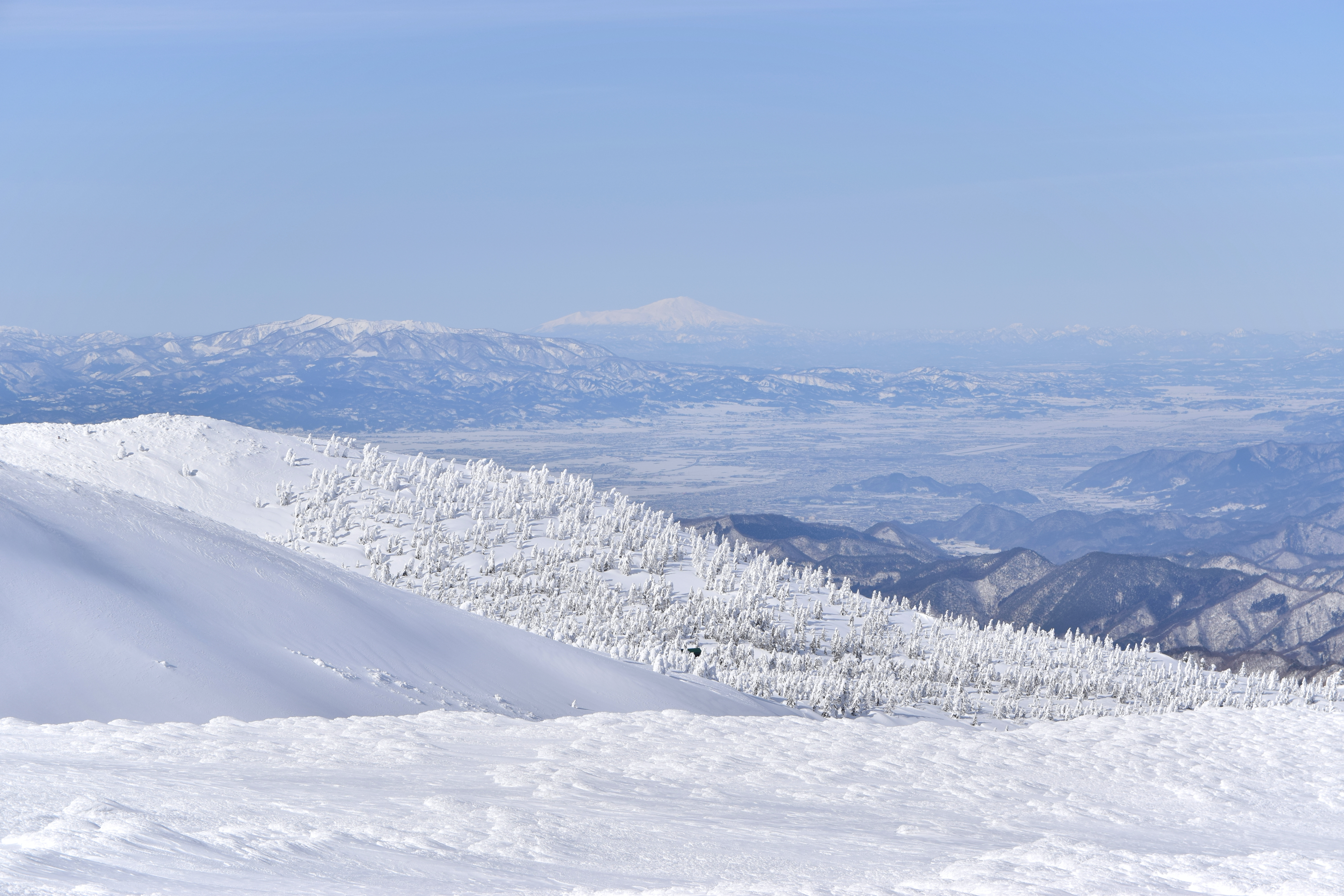
Winter with frozen coniferous trees near Mt. Kumano in the Mount Zaō range in Miyagi Prefecture

In winter, the Siberian High develops over the Eurasian land mass and the Aleutian Low develops over the northern Pacific Ocean. The result is a flow of cold air southeastward across Japan that brings freezing temperatures and heavy snowfalls to the central mountain ranges facing the Sea of Japan, but clear skies to areas fronting on the Pacific.

The warmest winter temperatures are found in the Nanpō and Bonin Islands, which enjoy a tropical climate due to the combination of latitude, distance from the Asian continent, and warming effect of winds from the Kuroshio, as well as the Volcano Islands (at the latitude of the southernmost of the Ryukyu Islands, 24° N). The coolest summer temperatures are found on the northeastern coast of Hokkaidō in Kushiro and Nemuro Subprefectures.

As cold, dry northwesterly winds from Siberia cross the relatively warm Sea of Japan, they absorb heat and water vapour from the sea surface. This moisture contributes to the formation of snow clouds, which bring frequent and sometimes heavy snowfall to the Sea of Japan side of Japan, particularly in Hokkaido and the mountainous regions of northern and central Honshu.

Snowfall is particularly heavy where the moisture-laden air is forced to rise over Japan's mountain ranges, cooling as it gains altitude and releasing precipitation as snow. This process, known as orographic lift, contributes to the large snowfall totals recorded in mountainous areas along the Sea of Japan coast. The mountains also create a pronounced contrast between Japan's two sides, with much of the winter precipitation falling on the windward slopes while the Pacific side generally experiences clearer and drier weather.

== Sunshine ==
Sunshine, in accordance with Japan's uniformly heavy rainfall, is generally modest in quantity, though no part of Japan receives the consistently gloomy fogs that envelop the Sichuan Basin or Taipei. Amounts range from about six hours per day on the Inland Sea coast and sheltered parts of the Pacific Coast and Kantō Plain to four hours per day on the Sea of Japan coast of Hokkaidō. In December there is a very pronounced sunshine gradient between the Sea of Japan and the Pacific coasts, as the former side can receive less than 30 hours and the Pacific side as much as 180 hours. In summer, however, sunshine hours are lowest on exposed parts of the Pacific coast where fogs from the Oyashio current create persistent cloud cover similar to that found on the Kuril Islands and Sakhalin.

== Extreme temperature records ==
The highest recorded temperature in Japan was 41.8 °C (107.2 °F) on 5 August 2025. The high humidity and the maritime influence make temperatures in the 40s rare, with summers dominated by a more stable subtropical monsoon pattern through most of Japan. The lowest was −41.0 °C (−41.8 °F) in Asahikawa on 25 January 1902. However an unofficial −41.5 °C was taken in Bifuka on 27 January 1931. Mount Fuji broke the Japanese record lows for each month except January, February, March, and December. Record lows for any month were taken as recently as 1967.

Minami-Tori-shima has a tropical savanna climate (Köppen climate classification Aw) and the highest average temperature in Japan of 25 degrees Celsius.

== Extreme records data ==
Climate data for Japan
Month	Jan	Feb	Mar	Apr	May	Jun	Jul	Aug	Sep	Oct	Nov	Dec	Year
Record high °C (°F)	29.7 (85.5)	29.1 (84.4)	30.4 (86.7)	33.7 (92.7)	39.5 (103.1)	40.2 (104.4)	41.2 (106.2)	41.8 (107.2)	40.4 (104.7)	36.0 (96.8)	34.2 (93.6)	31.6 (88.9)	41.8 (107.2)
Record low °C (°F)	−41.0 (−41.8)	−38.3 (−36.9)	−35.2 (−31.4)	−27.8 (−18.0)	−18.9 (−2.0)	−13.1 (8.4)	−6.9 (19.6)	−4.3 (24.3)	−10.8 (12.6)	−19.5 (−3.1)	−28.1 (−18.6)	−34.2 (−29.6)	−41.0 (−41.8)
Source: Japan Meteorological Agency and

Climate data for Tokyo (1991–2020 normals, extremes 1875–present) (Köppen Cfa)
Month	Jan	Feb	Mar	Apr	May	Jun	Jul	Aug	Sep	Oct	Nov	Dec	Year
Record high °C (°F)	22.6 (72.7)	24.9 (76.8)	25.3 (77.5)	29.2 (84.6)	32.6 (90.7)	36.4 (97.5)	39.5 (103.1)	39.1 (102.4)	38.1 (100.6)	32.6 (90.7)	27.3 (81.1)	24.8 (76.6)	39.5 (103.1)
Mean daily maximum °C (°F)	9.8 (49.6)	10.9 (51.6)	14.2 (57.6)	19.4 (66.9)	23.6 (74.5)	26.1 (79.0)	29.9 (85.8)	31.3 (88.3)	27.5 (81.5)	22.0 (71.6)	16.7 (62.1)	12.0 (53.6)	20.3 (68.5)
Daily mean °C (°F)	5.4 (41.7)	6.1 (43.0)	9.4 (48.9)	14.3 (57.7)	18.8 (65.8)	21.9 (71.4)	25.7 (78.3)	26.9 (80.4)	23.3 (73.9)	18.0 (64.4)	12.5 (54.5)	7.7 (45.9)	15.8 (60.4)
Mean daily minimum °C (°F)	1.2 (34.2)	2.1 (35.8)	5.0 (41.0)	9.8 (49.6)	14.6 (58.3)	18.5 (65.3)	22.4 (72.3)	23.5 (74.3)	20.3 (68.5)	14.8 (58.6)	8.8 (47.8)	3.8 (38.8)	12.1 (53.8)
Record low °C (°F)	−9.2 (15.4)	−7.9 (17.8)	−5.6 (21.9)	−3.1 (26.4)	2.2 (36.0)	8.5 (47.3)	13.0 (55.4)	15.4 (59.7)	10.5 (50.9)	−0.5 (31.1)	−3.1 (26.4)	−6.8 (19.8)	−9.2 (15.4)
Average precipitation mm (inches)	59.7 (2.35)	56.5 (2.22)	116.0 (4.57)	133.7 (5.26)	139.7 (5.50)	167.8 (6.61)	156.2 (6.15)	154.7 (6.09)	224.9 (8.85)	234.8 (9.24)	96.3 (3.79)	57.9 (2.28)	1,598.2 (62.92)
Average snowfall cm (inches)	4 (1.6)	4 (1.6)	0 (0)	0 (0)	0 (0)	0 (0)	0 (0)	0 (0)	0 (0)	0 (0)	0 (0)	0 (0)	8 (3.1)
Average precipitation days (≥ 0.5 mm)	5.3	6.1	10.3	10.9	11.1	12.8	12.0	9.4	12.3	11.8	8.2	5.8	116.0
Average relative humidity (%)	51	52	57	62	68	75	76	74	75	71	64	56	65
Average dew point °C (°F)	−5 (23)	−4 (25)	1 (34)	8 (46)	13 (55)	18 (64)	22 (72)	23 (73)	19 (66)	12 (54)	6 (43)	−1 (30)	9 (49)
Mean monthly sunshine hours	192.6	170.4	175.3	178.8	179.6	124.2	151.4	174.2	126.7	129.4	149.8	174.4	1,926.7
Average ultraviolet index	2	3	5	7	9	10	10	10	8	5	3	2	6
Source 1: Japan Meteorological Agency
Source 2: Weather Atlas (UV), Time and Date (dewpoints, 1985-2015)

Monthly temperature ranges
Record high temperatures					Record low temperatures			
Month	°C	°F	Location	Date	°C	°F	Location	Date
January	29.7	85.5	Minami-Tori-shima	7 January 1954; 9 January 2021	−41.0	−41.8	Asahikawa, Hokkaido	25 January 1902
February	29.1	84.4	Ishigaki, Okinawa	16 February 1898	−38.3	−36.9	Asahikawa, Hokkaido	11 February 1902
March	30.4	86.7	Naze, Kagoshima	26 March 1999	−35.2	−31.4	Obihiro, Hokkaido	3 March 1895
April	33.7	92.7	Yonago	28 April 2005	−27.8	−18.0	Mount Fuji	3 April 1965
May	39.5	103.1	Saroma	26 May 2019	−18.9	−2.0	Mount Fuji	3 May 1934
June	40.2	104.4	Isesaki	25 June 2022	−13.1	8.4	Mount Fuji	2 June 1981
July	41.2	106.2	Tamba, Hyōgo	30 July 2025	−6.9	19.6	Mount Fuji	4 July 1966
August	41.8	107.2	Isesaki, Gunma	5 August 2025	−4.3	24.3	Mount Fuji	25 August 1972
September	40.4	104.7	Sanjō, Niigata	3 September 2020	−10.8	12.6	Mount Fuji	23 September 1976
October	36.0	96.8	Sanjō, Niigata	6 October 2018	−19.5	−3.2	Mount Fuji	30 October 1984
November	34.2	93.6	Minami-Tori-shima	4 November 1953	−28.1	−18.6	Mount Fuji	30 November 1970
December	31.6	88.9	Minami-Tori-shima	5 December 1952	−34.2	−29.6	Obihiro, Hokkaido	30 December 1907

Seasonal temperature ranges
Record high temperatures					Record low temperatures			
Season	°C	°F	Location	Date	°C	°F	Location	Date
Winter	31.6	88.9	Minami-Tori-shima	5 December 1952	−41.0	−41.8	Asahikawa, Hokkaido	25 January 1902
Spring	39.5	103.1	Saroma, Hokkaido	26 May 2019	−35.2	−31.4	Obihiro, Hokkaido	3 March 1895
Summer	41.8	107.2	Isesaki, Gunma	5 August 2025	−13.1	8.4	Mount Fuji	2 June 1981
Autumn	40.4	104.7	Sanjō, Niigata	3 September 2020	−28.1	−18.6	Mount Fuji	30 November 1970

== See also ==
- Climate of China
- East Asian Monsoon
