= National Printing Bureau =

Japanese government agency, produces banknotes

Coordinates: 35.6688°N 139.7451°E

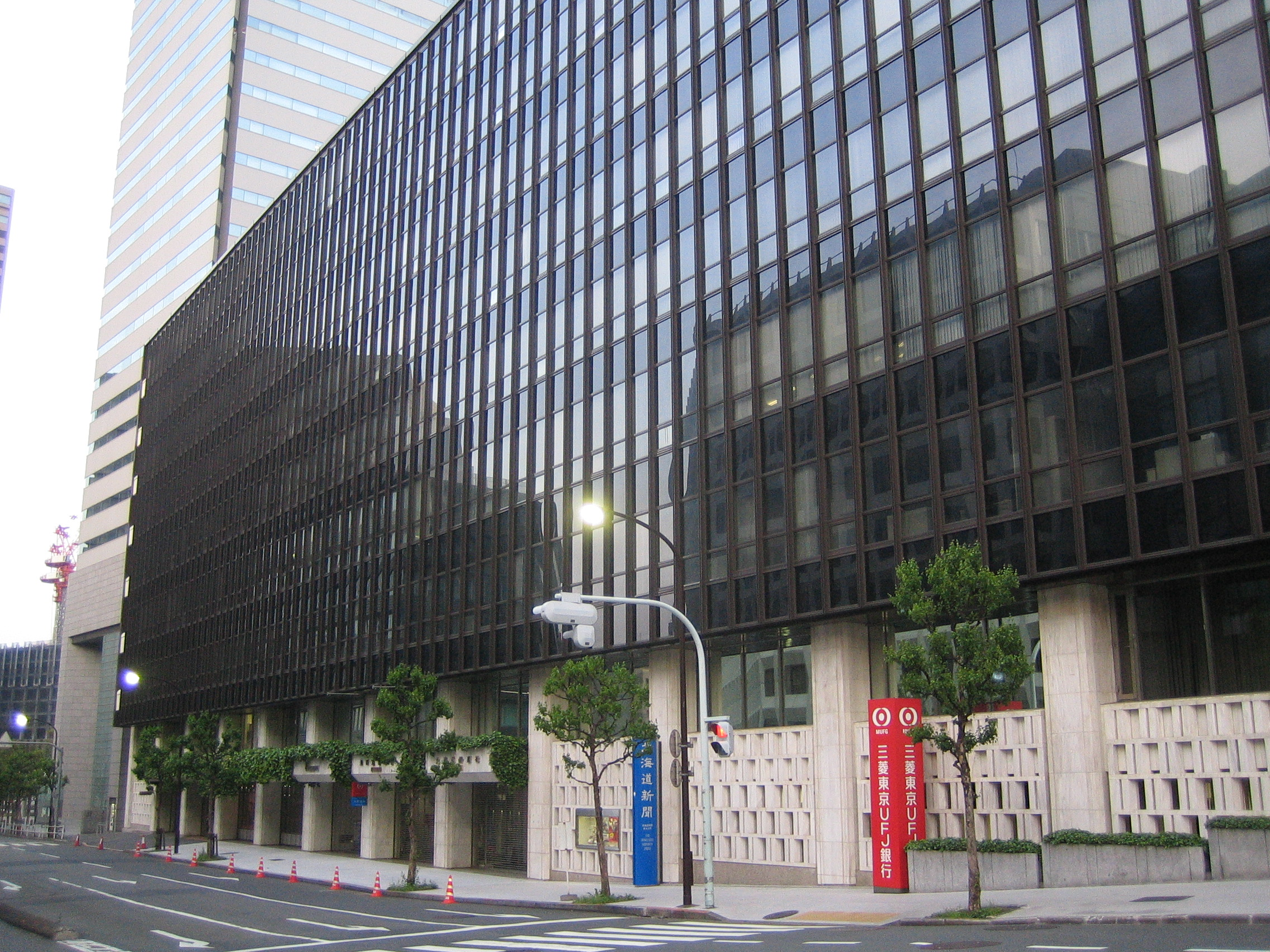
- Head office, in the Kyodo Tsushin Kaikan
- Formation: July 1871; 154 years ago as Paper Money Office; April 1, 2003; 23 years ago as National Printing Bureau
- Type: Incorporated Administrative Agency
- Legal status: Active
- Purpose: To contribute to the stability of the monetary system by manufacturing banknotes
- Region served: Japan
- Official language: Japanese; English (secondary)
- President: Takehito Matsumura
- Staff: 4,196 (as of January 1, 2019)
- Website: npb.go.jp

National Printing Bureau (独立行政法人国立印刷局, Dokuritsu gyōsei hōjin Kokuritsu Insatsu-kyoku) (NPB) is a Japanese governmental agency in charge of the production of Japanese paper money, Japanese yen. It also produces various other products, such as postage stamps and the official governmental gazette.

== History ==
The Paper Money Office was created on July 27, 1871 under the administration of the Ministry of Finance, and was soon renamed in August the Paper Money Bureau. At the time, banknote printing was outsourced to the United States and Germany, as Japan did not have the required facilities for domestic production. The bureau managed the private banks and managed the issue and exchange of banknotes.

In January 1872, production of paper money was handed over to the Paper Money Bureau, and it acquired papermaking and printing duties. These included the production of banknotes, securities, postage stamps, and typographic printing. The first domestically produced Japanese money, a 1-yen banknote, was created on October 15, 1877.

The Paper Money Bureau was merged with the Official Gazette Bureau on January 1, 1898, and thus acquired the duty of printing the Official Gazette, starting July 2, 1898. The Bureau became an incorporated administrative agency (Independent Administrative Institution) in April 2003.

== Organization ==
The NPB includes a Head Office, Research Institute, Government Publications Service Center, and several production plants.

=== Head office ===
The head office includes strategic planning, evaluation and auditing, security products, information products, research and development, general affairs, human resources, and finance and accounting departments.

=== Plants ===
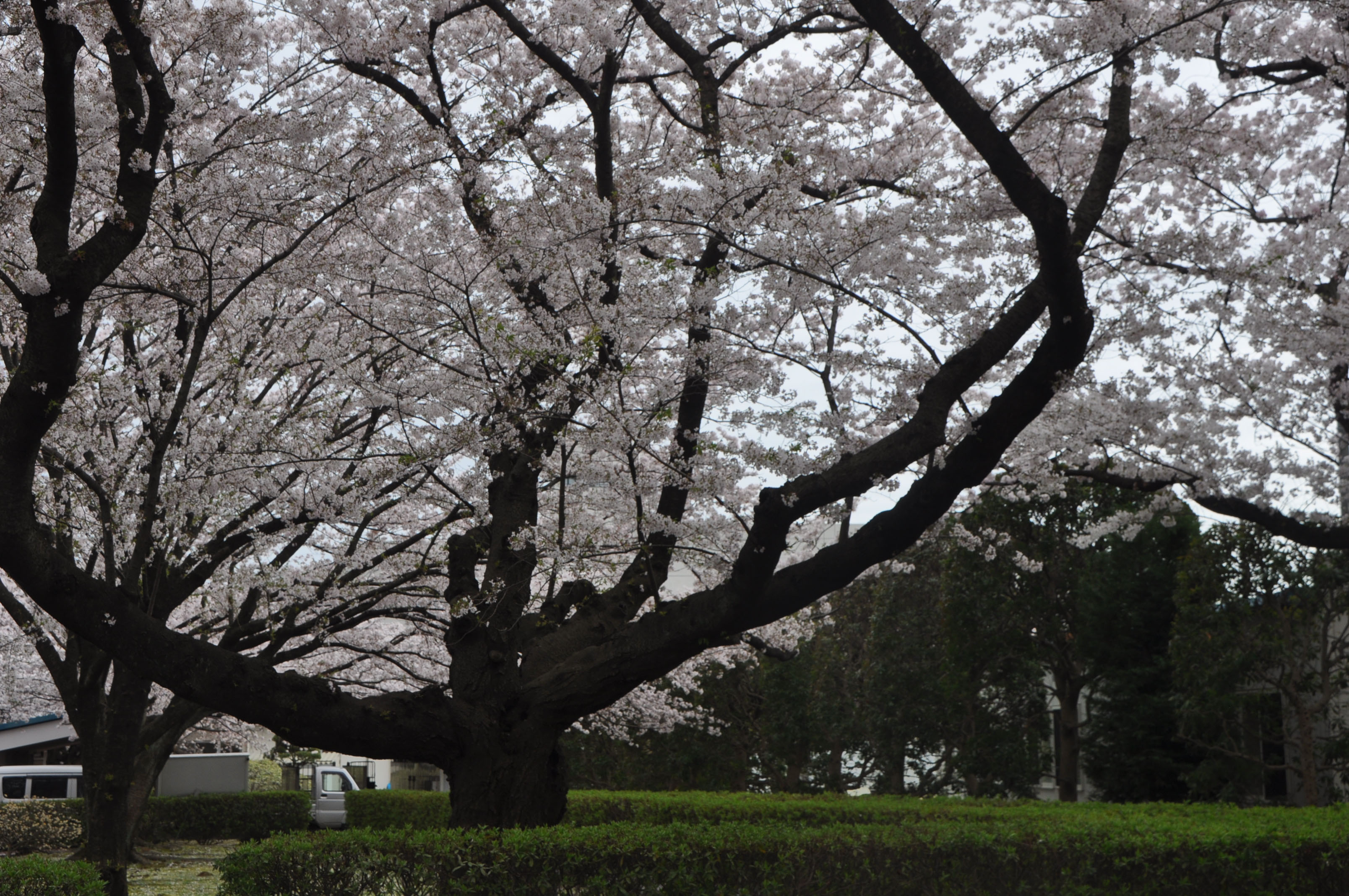
Cherry Blossoms at National Printing Bureau's Odawara Plant (2015)

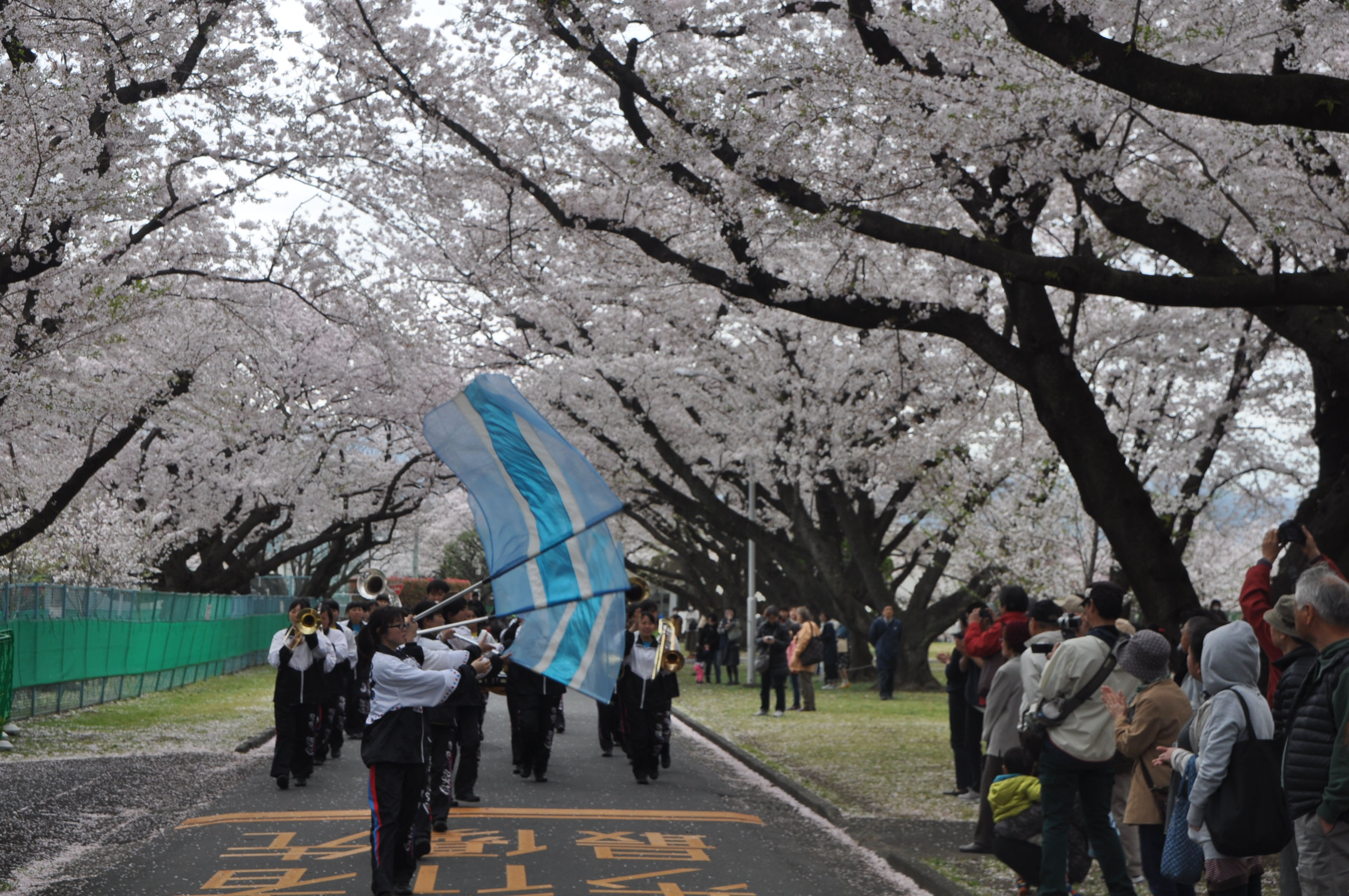
Cherry Blossoms Open House for Hanami at National Printing Bureau's Odawara Plant (2015)

The NPB has several production plants. Toranomon is responsible for publishing the Official Gazette and other government publications. At Takinogawa banknotes, public bonds, and certificate stamps are made, and at Oji postage stamps are printed. Plants at Odawara, Shizuoka, and Hikone also produce banknotes, while Odawara makes paper as well, along with Okayama.

The Odawara Plant, where about 500 Someiyoshino and other cherry trees are planted, holds on a weekend in early April, every year, an open house to let the general public enjoy viewing cherry blossoms.

== Environmental activities ==
The Bureau's environmental philosophy is "Conduct business activities in harmony with the environment." It is attempting to acquire ISO 14001 certification. Five of its plants have already done so: Takinogawa in 2002, Odawara in 2004, Hikone in 2006, Okayama in 2007, and Shizuoka in 2009. The Bureau prepares and publishes an environmental report on its website yearly.

Five areas of focus are:

- Environmental Compliance: Compliance with environmental laws and regulations
- Resource and Energy Saving: Reduction in the usage of resources and energy, and in waste production
- Product Design and Production with Low Environmental Load: Engineering products for minimal environmental impact in all phases of the product lifecycle
- Green Procurement
- Environmental Conservation Enlightenment: Promotion of awareness through employee education programs
