= 10 sen note =

Japanese currency denomination (1872–1948)

- Country: Japan
- Value: 1/10 Japanese yen
- Years of printing: 1872–1947 (Note: Non consecutive)

Obverse
- Design: Various designs depending on the series.

Reverse
- Design: Various designs depending on the series.

The 10 sen note (十銭紙幣) was a denomination of Japanese yen issued in four different series from 1872 to 1947 for use in commerce. Meiji Tsūhō notes are the first modern banknotes issued after Japanese officials studied western culture. There circulated alongside ten sen coins until their withdrawal in 1887. The subsequent series were influenced by World War I and World War II; fractional ten sen notes were issued due to a coin shortage caused by the first war. They were suspended in the early 1920s and later demonetized in 1948. The final two series were issued by the Bank of Japan, not the treasury. The initial series was released as ten sen coins could no longer be produced, and the 'A' series was introduced post-war to combat inflation. Both were demonetized by the end of 1953, following a law that favored the yen over subsidiary notes. Ten sen notes are now collected and traded based on their condition.

== Government currency ==
=== Meiji Tsūhō (1872) ===
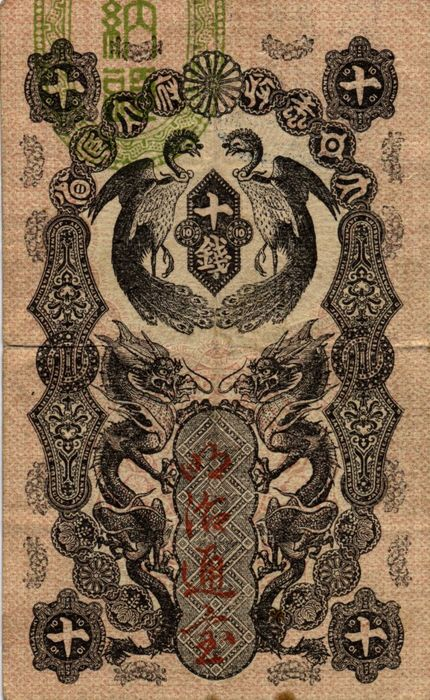
Meiji Tsūhō note (obverse)

The first ten sen notes adopted and released by the Japanese government are part of a series known as Meiji Tsūhō (明治通宝). These notes were the first Japanese currency ever to be printed using western printing at "Dondorf and Naumann", which was located in Frankfurt. Meiji Tsuho notes were designed by Edoardo Chiossone sometime in 1870 while he was working for Dondorf Naumann on behalf of The National Bank in the Kingdom of Italy. The process of making Chiossone's proposed design a reality started with the establishment of the "Imperial Printing Bureau of Japan" in 1871 (4th year of Meiji). In order to produce the currency the Japanese government reached out to Dondorf and Naumann to gain access to Western technology. Chiossone had a falling out with Italian Bank as his relationship with them had hit a breaking point. When the company suggested Chiossone for the role as engraver, he quickly accepted the offer. The production of money was handed over to the Imperial Printing Bureau in January 1872 when banknotes began to arrive from Germany. All of these arrivals were purposely left incomplete due to security reasons, as the words "Meiji Tsuho" and the mark of the Minister of Finance were added by the Imperial Printing Bureau. Woodblock printing was eventually employed to save hundreds of people the work of handwriting the characters "Meiji Tsuho" on each individual note. Ten sen notes in particular were released in April 1872 (year 5), along with 20 sen, 50 sen, and 1 yen notes. These notes measure 87 mm x 53 mm in size, and feature an elaborate design that was difficult to forge at the time as counterfeiting was previously rampant with clan notes. Eventually enough Western technology was brought over to Japan as the Japanese government produced some one yen Meiji Tsūhō notes domestically. The elaborate design worked against counterfeiters for an unknown period of time before they found a way around it. Unstamped notes sent to Japan from Germany were legally obtained by these thieves. Normally Japanese officials would add stamps to the notes finalizing the process, where in this case the counterfeiters added their own stamps. The Japanese government responded by re-issuing subsidiary currency through a new series in 1882. This new currency only included twenty and fifty sen notes which were hurried through the process. Meiji Tsūhō ten sen notes were eventually suspended from circulation either in March or June 1887 (year 20) leaving no medium of exchange. It wasn't until February 28, 1890 that a law was passed to allow the exchange and withdrawal of the notes. This was fixed at a 3 year period that lapsed on February 27, 1893.

=== Taishō fractional notes (1917–1921) ===
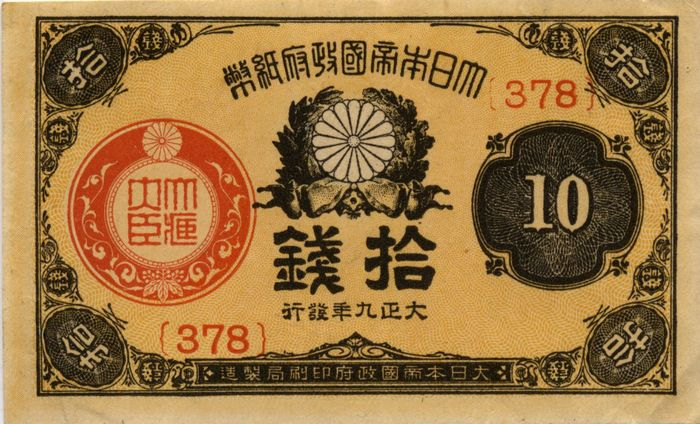
10 sen note obverse (1920)

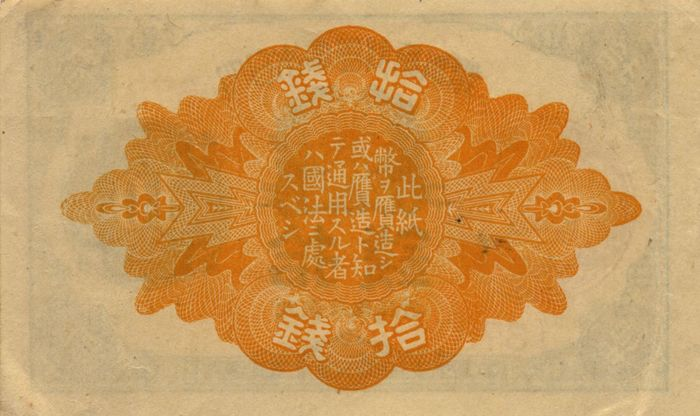
10 sen note reverse (1920)

During the reign of Emperor Taishō, the Japanese government initially issued silver coinage as had been done previously under Meiji. World War I started on July 28, 1914 eventually bringing Japan a booming economy due to a large trade surplus. The negative effects from this event included an increased demand for subsidiary coins which led to a coin shortage. To remedy the situation an imperial ordinance was promulgated on October 29, 1917 issuing fractional currency in the amount of thirty million yen. Actual issuance occurred in the following month with the notes being legal tender up to ten yen. The series as a whole is known as Taishō fractional notes (大正小額政府紙幣), which were issued at the time by the treasury rather than the Bank of Japan as the series was considered an emergency issue. Taishō era notes measure 86 mm x 54 mm in size and have a black and orange hue. The obverse side of the notes feature the Finance Minister's seal and chrysanthemum flower emblem, while on the reverse is decorated in a colored pattern. There is a central feature on the reverse side which mentions counterfeit penalties (1 year imprisonment or 200,000 yen fine) enforced by law.

It was initially agreed that the notes would be bound by a restriction stating that they could only be issued until one year after the end of the war. This date came and went as World War I ended in November 1918 (year 7) and the new year began. It was ultimately decided to allow the issuance to continue for a while longer as there was still a shortage in coinage. Ten sen coins were produced in copper-nickel for the first time in 1920 replacing silver as an alloy. Issuance of Taishō ten sen notes continued until their suspension on April 1, 1921 with exceptions made for people who wanted to exchange "soiled or damaged" notes. Production increased for ten sen coins which peaked in 1922 and 1923 (year 11 and 12) to encourage the public to redeem the old ten sen notes. This practice lasted into the Shōwa era until at least 1932 (Shōwa year 7) in exchange for new coins. Rapid inflation caused by World War II eventually rendered Taishō ten sen notes worthless and obsolete. The notes held on to their legal tender status until August 31, 1948 when they were abolished. Their coinage counterparts were eventually demonetized at the end of 1953 when the Japanese government passed a law abolishing subsidiary coinage in favor of the yen. Currencies of less than one yen were rarely used by this time anyway due to excessive post-war inflation.

== Bank of Japan currency ==
=== First issue series (1944) ===
First issue ten sen notes (い10銭券) were printed as a direct result of World War II. Previously currency consisted of ten sen coins which were minted in tin provided from Japanese occupied Southeast Asia. These coins were discontinued towards the end of 1944 due to allied air superiority and control over the seas, making further tin procurement nearly impossible. Ten sen first series notes were released shortly afterwards starting on November 1, 1944 (Shōwa year 19). The Bank of Japan was responsible for issuing the notes having been reorganized two years earlier. Ten sen first issue notes feature the "Peace Tower" in Heiwadai Park on the obverse, while the reverse is decorated in a color crest. The notes measure 51mm x 106mm in size and have a black on purple underprint hue. Ten sen first issue notes were eventually demonetized at the end of 1953 when the Japanese government passed a law abolishing this series of subsidiary currency in favor of the yen. Like their other counterparts, currencies of less than one yen were rarely used by this time due to excessive post-war inflation.

=== A series (1947) ===
The last "10 sen" notes were issued on September 5, 1947 as part of the A series (A10銭券). These notes feature doves on the obverse, while the reverse shows the National Diet Building. The notes measure 100mm x 52mm in size and have a Black on blue underprint/light red-brown hue. In order to curb post-war inflation, the Bank of Japan invalidated all banknotes worth over a yen and issued new notes. Those in the "A series" with the exception of the 100 yen note were all poorly made due to post-war turmoil. Ten sen notes of the "A series" were printed by two different private sector companies which led to "big differences" and counterfeiting. This final series was eventually demonetized at the end of 1953 when the Japanese government passed a law abolishing subsidiary notes in favor of the yen. As with others listed here, currencies of less than one yen were rarely used by this time due to excessive post-war inflation.

=== Designs ===
Series (Note: These notes are not dated)	Obverse	Reverse
1944 (昭和19) ("First issue series")		
1947 (昭和22) ("A series")		

== Collecting ==
The value of any given banknote is determined by survivability rate and condition as collectors in general prefer original notes with bright rich coloring. In contrast to this are notes with ink stains, missing pieces, and evidence of repairs which can all impact the value of any given note. Ten sen notes issued for commerce in this case are more valuable by age. The oldest notes include the Meiji Tsūhō series issued from 1872 to 1887. Over one-hundred million of these ten sen notes were produced during their fifteen year use in commerce. The abundance of notes issued has made collecting ten sen Meiji Tsūhō the easiest when compared to other denominations. "Expensive" purchases can be expected for quality as the amount of surviving banknotes remain in mostly worn grades. These notes can be obtained in average condition for 2500+ yen with prices ranging in the 10,000s of yen for examples in high grades. "Many" contemporary counterfeit notes exist on the market which feature replicated stamps so professional grading is recommended. The last series issued for commerce by the Japanese treasury were Taishō fractional notes. Those in the ten sen denomination were issued from 1917 (Taishō year 6) to 1921 (Taishō year 10) and are valued highest with the oldest issue. As with the previous series these were issued in large amounts making those in higher grades more valuable. Average condition notes can be collected for less than 1,000 yen, but prices soar with pristine 1917 (year 6) examples. The final two series issued by the Bank of Japan are now easy and inexpensive to collect as they were issued in large amounts. Exceptions exist for "specimen" notes and those with errors which are highly valued.

== See also ==
- Banknotes of the Japanese yen
- Bank of Japan
- Dai-Ichi Ginko Korean notes - similar in appearance to Meiji Tsūhō notes.
