= 20 sen coin =

Former Japanese coin

Twenty Sen
- Japan
- Value: 1/5 Japanese Yen
- Edge: Reeded
- Shape: Circular
- Composition: 80% Silver; 20% Copper
- Years of minting: 1870–1911

Obverse
- Design: Various, depending on year.

Reverse
- Design: Various, depending on year.

The 20 sen coin (二十銭銀貨) was a Japanese coin worth one fifth of a Japanese yen, as 100 sen equalled 1 yen. These coins were all minted in silver during the Meiji era from 1870 to 1911.

== History ==
=== Meiji coinage (1870–1911) ===
Twenty sen coins were first struck towards the end of 1870 (year 3 of Meiji) from a newly established mint at Osaka. Initially, this process was done by engineers from the United Kingdom as Japan did not have the technology or raw materials to manufacture new coins. Authorization was given to strike 20 sen coins in .800 silver, weighs 72.2 grains (4.68g), and has a 23.62mm diameter (0.93 in). (Note: Modern sourcing places the diameter at 24mm (0.94 in) and the weight at 5 grams.) The first design used is nicknamed "rising sun dragon" (旭日竜, Asahi Ryu), which had its features engraved by a commission of Japanese artists. The obverse side features a dragon with an open mouth, while on the reverse there is a paulownia decoration with a sunburst in the center, and the chrysanthemum seal up on top. While dated 1870 (year 3), these first year twenty sen coins were not released into circulation until the following year (1871). During this time, the coins along with twelve other denominations were adopted by the Meiji government in an act signed on June 27, 1871. This newly adopted coinage gave Japan a western style decimal system based on units of yen, which were broken down into subsidiary currency of sen, and rin. Twenty sen coins were legal tender only up to the amount of 10 yen which was fixed by government regulations.

An issue soon arose when the weight of silver twenty sen coins per face value became too light in regard to the higher valued silver 1 yen coin. As a remedy, an amendment to the new currency act (Daijo-kan Declaration No. 341 (新貨幣量目寸法改正)) was adopted in November 1872 (year 5) which intended to increase the weight of the twenty sen coin. This action was never carried out, and the currency act was amended again in the following year. Changes in weight, diameter, and design features of the twenty sen coin was implemented in February 1873 (year 6) by Daijo-kan Declaration No. 46. The weight issue was resolved by adjusting the coin from 72.2 to 83.2 grains (5.4g) to avoid any public mistrust on the silver content. Twenty sen coins were also reduced slightly in diameter from 24mm to 22.42mm. The second used design has a "western style" medallic orientation, which is nicknamed "dragon silver 20 sen" (竜二十銭銀貨) as the sunburst on the reverse was replaced by a wreath. Arabic script is used for the first time with "20 SEN" on the obverse under the dragon. Architect Edward Reed mentions that twenty sen coins continued to be minted until at least June 30, 1878. Its theorized that the Satsuma Rebellion could have had an impact as their production was subsequently halted. Only proof strikes were made for coins dated 1880 (year 13) for exclusive use in presentation sets.

Japan experienced a sharp drop in prices as the economy contracted over the next few years in response to high inflation caused by the Satsuma Rebellion. The Bank of Japan was established in 1882 (year 15) to remedy the situation, and eventually twenty sen coins dated 1885 (year 18) were minted again. For reasons unknown there are no twenty sen coins dated 1889 or 1890 (year 22 and 23). Coincidentally, during this time a special fund was created to redeem all government notes for silver. The Japanese government promulgated the "currency law" (Meiji 30 Law No. 16) in 1897 which replaced the previous "new currency act". This law abolished the silver yen at which subsidiary silver coins were previously fixed at, and officially switched Japan from a silver standard to a gold standard. No changes were made to twenty sen coins as they were re-established to their previous weight, diameter, and design. Production continued as the price of silver bullion remained steady throughout the rest of the century. The situation changed in 1903 (year 36) when the sharply rising price of silver bullion threatened to exceed the face value of the twenty sen coin. An amendment to the "currency law" was promulgated in March 1906 which lowered the diameter and weight of twenty sen coins from 22.42mm to 20.3mm, and from 5.4g to 4.1 grams.

The third and final design used on these smaller and lighter coins is nicknamed "rising sun 20 sen" (旭日20銭銀貨, Asahi Nijusen), as a sunburst design was restored for the reverse. A wreath which had been previously used on the reverse side was adopted for the obverse as the dragon design was abandoned. This was due to the aftermath of the First Sino-Japanese War which lasted from 1894 to 1895. The dragon symbol was no longer viewed positively by the Japanese as the Qing dynasty (in practice) honored it. No additional changes were made afterwards as the coins continued to be produced for circulation until 1911 (year 44).

=== Taishō proposals (1918–1921) ===
During the reign of Emperor Taishō, coinage in general was impacted by World War I which broke out in 1914 (year 3 of Taishō). While this brought Japan a booming economy due to a large trade surplus, the negative effects included a coin shortage as subsidiary coins were in high demand. Twenty sen coins in particular were additionally impacted by a high demand for silver bullion, causing prices to rise above the face value of the coin. As a response the Japanese government tried to temporary ban the export of silver without success, and later had to issue twenty sen emergency banknotes in November 1917. The "currency law" was revised in May 1918 (Law No. 42) to lower the silver content in twenty sen coins from 80% to 72% silver (the copper content was raised from 20% to 28%). It stipulated that newly struck twenty sen coins were to have a reduction in diameter from 20.3mm to 16.7mm, and in weight from 4.1 to 3 grams. While proposals were struck from 1918 to 1921, none of the presentation pieces ever made it beyond the pattern stage for approval in general circulation. These pattern coins are now known as Yatagarasu sen (八咫烏銭, eight-span crow sen) after the design featured on them. (Note: There is one 1918 (year 7) dated example which is distinctively different from the others featuring a wreath/sunburst design combination.) Twenty sen banknotes were last issued in 1919 and were allowed to circulate until their suspension on April 1, 1921. Efforts to re-establish the twenty sen coin were abandoned by this time, as silver bullion rose above the face value of the coin again. Twenty sen coins were eventually demonetized at the end of 1953 when the Japanese government passed a law abolishing subsidiary coinage in favor of the yen. Currencies of less than one yen were rarely used after World War II anyway due to excessive post-war inflation.

== Weight and size ==
Minted	Diameter	Mass
1870–1871	24.0mm	5.0g
1873–1905	22.4mm	5.4g
1906–1911	20.3mm	4.1g

== Circulation figures ==
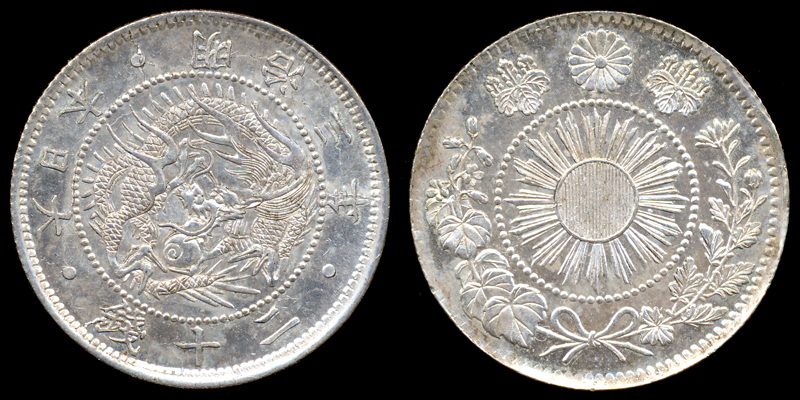
20 sen coin from 1870 (year 3) Design 1 - (1870–1871)

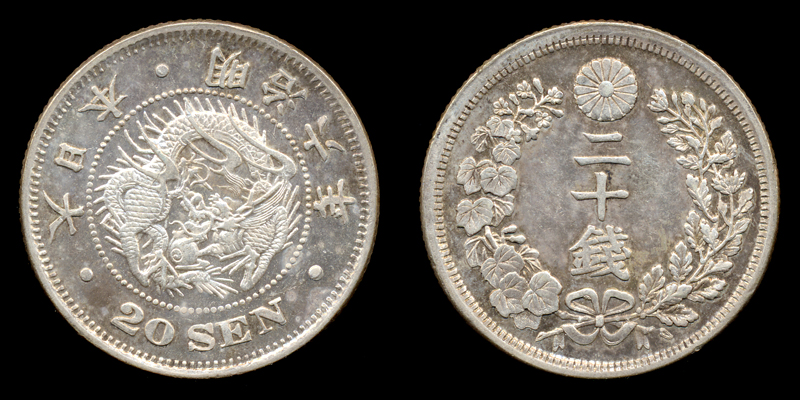
20 sen coin from 1873 (year 6) Design 2 - (1873–1905)

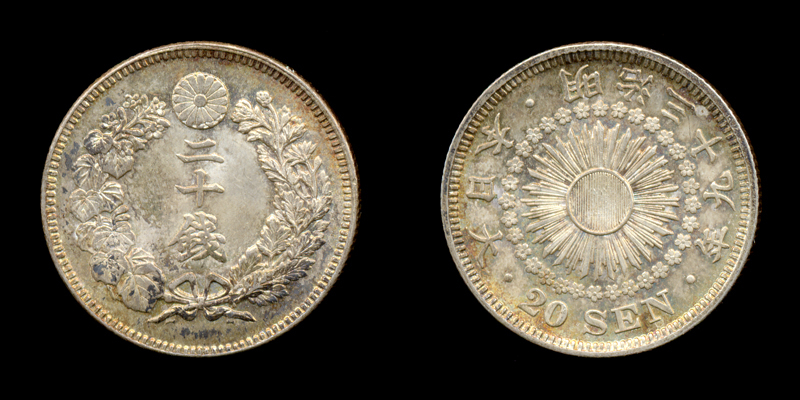
20 sen coin from 1906 (year 39) Design 3 - (1906–1911)

Meiji

The following are circulation figures for the twenty sen coin, all of which were minted between the 3rd, and 44th year of Meiji's reign. The dates all begin with the Japanese symbol 明治 (Meiji), followed by the year of his reign the coin was minted. Each coin is read clockwise from right to left, so in the example used below "一十二" would read as "year 21" or 1888.

- "Year" ← "Number representing year of reign" ← "Emperor's name" (Ex: 年 ← 一十二 ← 治明)

Year of reign	Japanese date	Gregorian date	Mintage
3rd	三	1870 (Note: Two varieties were made in 1870 in regards to the depth of the dragon's scales (shallow and deep), their mintage is combined.)	4,313,015
4th	四	1871 (Note: Coins minted in 1871 have a scarce variety where the lower stroke in 銭 ("Sen") on the obverse is incomplete)	4,313,015
6th	六	1873 (Note: Two different types were made this year, their mintage is combined.)	6,214,284
7th	七	1874	3,024,242
8th	八	1875 (Note: Two varieties were made for 1875 and 1876 (year 8 and 9) dated coins, as they either feature "long" or "short" ribbons on the reverse. Their mintages are combined.)	612,736
9th	九	1876	9,200,892
10th	十	1877	5,199,731
13th	三十	1880	96 (Note: Not intended for circulation.)
18th	八十	1885	4,205,723
20th	十二	1887	4,794,755
21st	一十二	1888	703,920
24th	四十二	1891	2,500,000
25th	五十二	1892	3,054,693
26th	六十二	1893	3,445,307
27th	七十二	1894	4,500,000
28th	八十二	1895	7,000,000
29th	九十二	1896	2,599,340
30th	十三	1897	7,516,448
31st	一十三	1898	17,984,212
32nd	二十三	1899	15,000,000
33rd	三十三	1900	800,000
34th	四十三	1901	500,000
37th	七十三	1904	5,250,000
38th	八十三	1905	8,444,930
39th	九十三	1906	6,550,070
40th	十四	1907	20,000,000
41st	一十四	1908	15,000,000
42nd	二十四	1909	8,824,702
43rd	三十四	1910	21,175,298
44th	四十四	1911	500,000

== Collecting ==
The value of any given coin is determined by survivability rate and condition as collectors in general prefer uncleaned appealing coins. The first coins minted use the "Asahi Ryu" or rising sun dragon design which only lasted two years (1870–1871). The latter of these two dated coins (year 4) has two varieties which include the character 銭 (sen) with a missing stroke. As these coins are scarce they are valued significantly more than those with the whole character present. The scales of the dragon design are another factor of rarity as those with clear (deep) scales on the dragon's design are also worth more than obscure (shallow) ones.

The second design lasted much longer in comparison as it was featured on 20 sen coins from 1873 to 1905 (year 6 to 38). Coins dated 1873 (year 6) once again have the character "明" in Meiji's name separated as the first variety, or have a line connecting both the left and right features as the second variety. There are also coins that are missing a top stroke on the left feature creating an "open" appearance versus those with a completed stroke. Those from the second "connected" variety, and examples with a missing top stroke on the left feature are worth more than their counterparts for this one year occurrence. Twenty sen coins dated 1875 and 1876 (year 8 and 9) either have "long" ribbons or "short" ribbons at the bottom of the wreath design. The "long" ribbons can be deafferented from the "short" design as the ribbons look flatter with more noticeable V-shaped tails. Twenty sen coins dated 1875 (year 8) are already considered a rarity due to their low mintage. In terms of added value though, "Type 1" long ribbons are more valuable on 1875 dated coins, while "Type 2" short ribbons are valued more for 1876. With a mintage of just 96 coins, those with the year 1880 (year 13) are not considered to be generally collectible. These are traded in 5 digit dollar (USD) amounts when they are sold at auction.

The production of twenty sen coins dated 1885 to 1905 (year 18 to 38) are more widely available to collectors aside from the dates 1888, 1900, and 1901 (year 21, 33 and 34). These are valued in the tens of thousands of yen in average condition, while common dates have a value in the low thousands of yen in the same grades. Twenty sen coins with the third and final design used from 1906 to 1910 (year 39 to 43) were generally made in large amounts. Most of these coins are in higher grades as their distribution and circulating period was short. There is a single rarity here in the last date of the series (1911 aka year 44) as the mintage for that year was low. Twenty sen trial or pattern strikes made under Emperor Taishō are listed elsewhere, these are all very rare and highly valued.

== See also ==
- Newfoundland twenty cents
- Philippine twenty-centavo coin
- Twenty-cent piece (United States coin)
