= 1 yen note =

Former denomination of Japanese yen paper currency

- Country: Japan
- Value: 1 Japanese yen
- Security features: Watermarks (Bank of Japan series only)
- Years of printing: 1872–1958 (Note: October 1, 1958 is a de jure "suspension" date given by the Bank of Japan. It is cited in their respective sections that each series of one yen note issued by the Bank of Japan was "discontinued" or "withdrawn" before this time.)

Obverse
- Design: Various designs depending on the series.

Reverse
- Design: Various designs depending on the series.

The 1 yen note (1円券) was a denomination of Japanese yen in seven different series from 1872 to 1946 for use in commerce. These circulated with the 1 yen coin until 1914, and briefly again before the notes were suspended in 1958. Notes from the Japanese government, known as "government notes," were the first to be issued through a company in Germany. Because they were being counterfeited, they were replaced by a new series which included the first portrait on a Japanese banknote. Almost concurrently, the government established a series of national banks modeled after the system in the United States. These national banks were private entities that also released their own notes which were later convertible into gold and silver. All three of these series came to an end due to massive inflation from the Satsuma Rebellion in 1877. National bank notes were re-issued as fiat currency before the national banks themselves were abolished. Both national bank and government one yen notes were gradually redeemed for Bank of Japan note starting in 1885. This redemption process lasted until all three series were abolished in 1899.

In 1882, the Bank of Japan was established to deal with the inflation problem. This was remedied by the gradual reduction of notes in circulation for notes issued by the centralized bank. From the time of the first issuance in 1885 to their suspension in 1958, one yen notes from four different series were issued by the bank. Their demise came from the aftermath of World War II due to massive inflation which devalued the yen. The last notes issued were poorly made and outsourced to the private sector for printing and production. All four series were suspended (de jure) by the Bank of Japan on October 1, 1958, in favor of the one yen aluminum coin. While one yen notes issued by the Bank of Japan remain legal tender today, they are worth much more in the collector's market.

== Government and National Bank Notes ==
=== Meiji Tsuho (1872-1879) ===
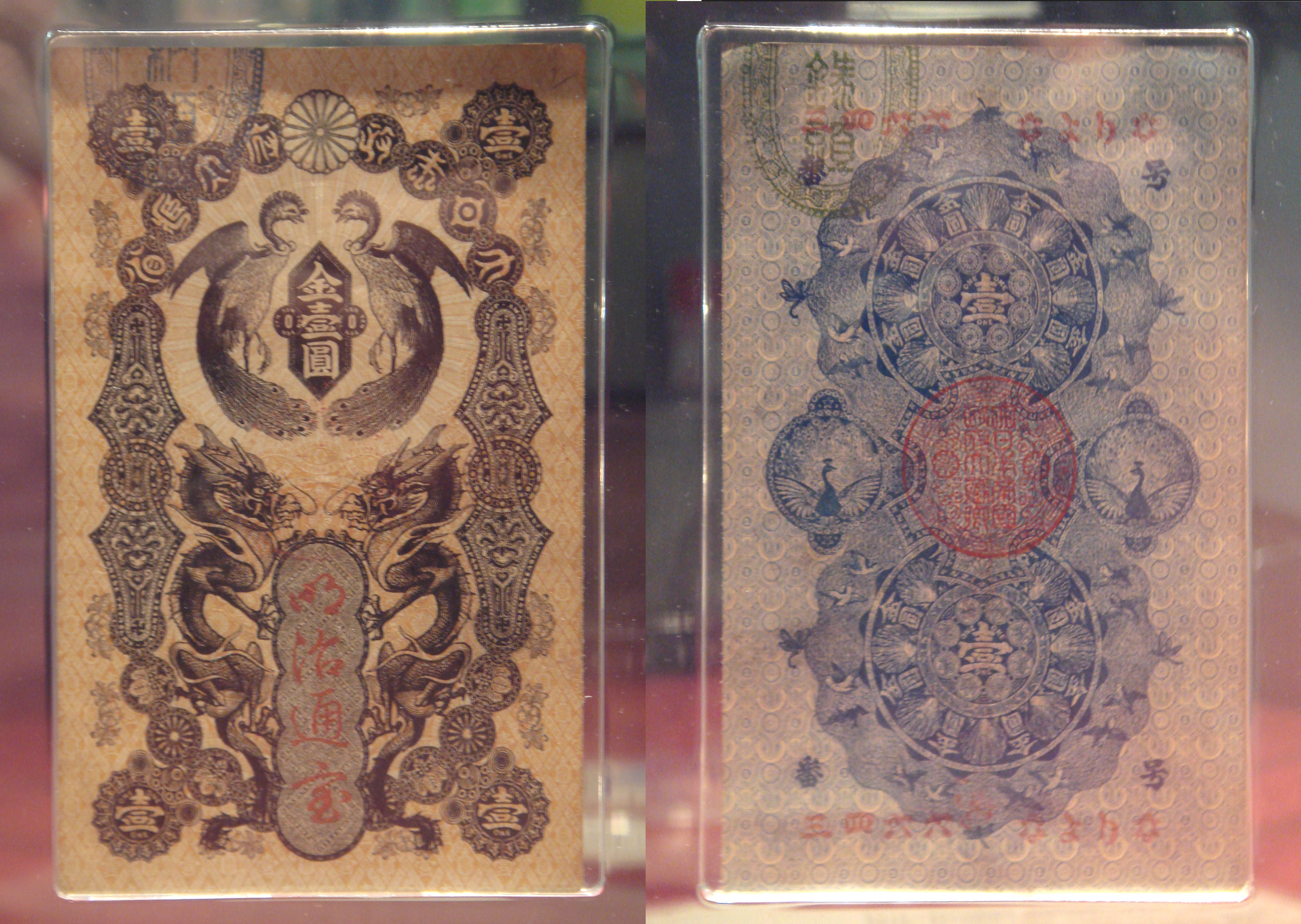
Meiji Tsuho one yen note

The first one yen notes adopted and released by the Japanese government were part of a series known as Meiji Tsūhō (明治通宝). These notes were the first Japanese currency ever to be printed using western printing at Dondorf and Naumann, which was located in Frankfurt. Meiji Tsuho notes were designed by Edoardo Chiossone sometime in 1870 while he was working for Dondorf Naumann on behalf of the National Bank of the Kingdom of Italy. The process of making Chiossone's proposed design a reality started with the establishment of the "Imperial Printing Bureau of Japan" in 1871 (4th year of Meiji). In order to produce the currency the Japanese government reached out to Dondorf and Naumann to gain access to Western technology. Chiossone had a falling out with Italian Bank as his relationship with them had hit a breaking point. When the company suggested Chiossone for the role as engraver, he quickly accepted the offer. The production of money was handed over to the Imperial Printing Bureau in January 1872 when banknotes began to arrive from Germany. All of these arrivals were purposely left incomplete due to security reasons, as the words "Meiji Tsuho" and the mark of the Minister of Finance were added by the Imperial Printing Bureau. Woodblock printing was eventually employed to save hundreds of people the work of handwriting the characters "Meiji Tsuho" on each individual note. One yen notes in particular were released in April 1872 (year 5), with subsidiary notes of 10, 20, and 50 sen. These notes measure 113mm x 71mm in size, and featured an elaborate design that was difficult to forge at the time as counterfeiting was previously rampant with clan notes. Eventually enough Western technology was brought over to Japan as the Japanese government produced some one yen Meiji Tsūhō notes domestically.

The elaborate design worked against counterfeiters for an unknown period of time before they found a way around it. Unstamped notes sent to Japan from Germany were legally obtained by these thieves. Normally Japanese officials would add stamps to the notes finalizing the process, where in this case the counterfeiters added their own stamps. Another major issue was the Satsuma Rebellion in February 1877, which helped lead to massive inflation due to the amount of inconvertible notes issued for payment. The Japanese government responded by stopping the issuance of government notes in 1879 as a hopeful remedy to the situation. During this time legal tender Meiji Tsuho one yen notes had issues with paper quality, and were circulating with counterfeits. These problems led the Japanese government to issue redesigned banknotes in 1881 to replace Meiji Tsuho notes. Additional measures were subsequently put into place which included the establishment of a centralized bank known as the Bank of Japan. All of the remaining Meiji Tsuho notes in circulation that weren't already redeemed were to be retired in favor of either silver coinage or newly printed Bank of Japan notes. This period of exchange lapsed when Meiji Tsuho notes were abolished on December 9, 1899.

=== National Bank Notes (1873-1880) ===
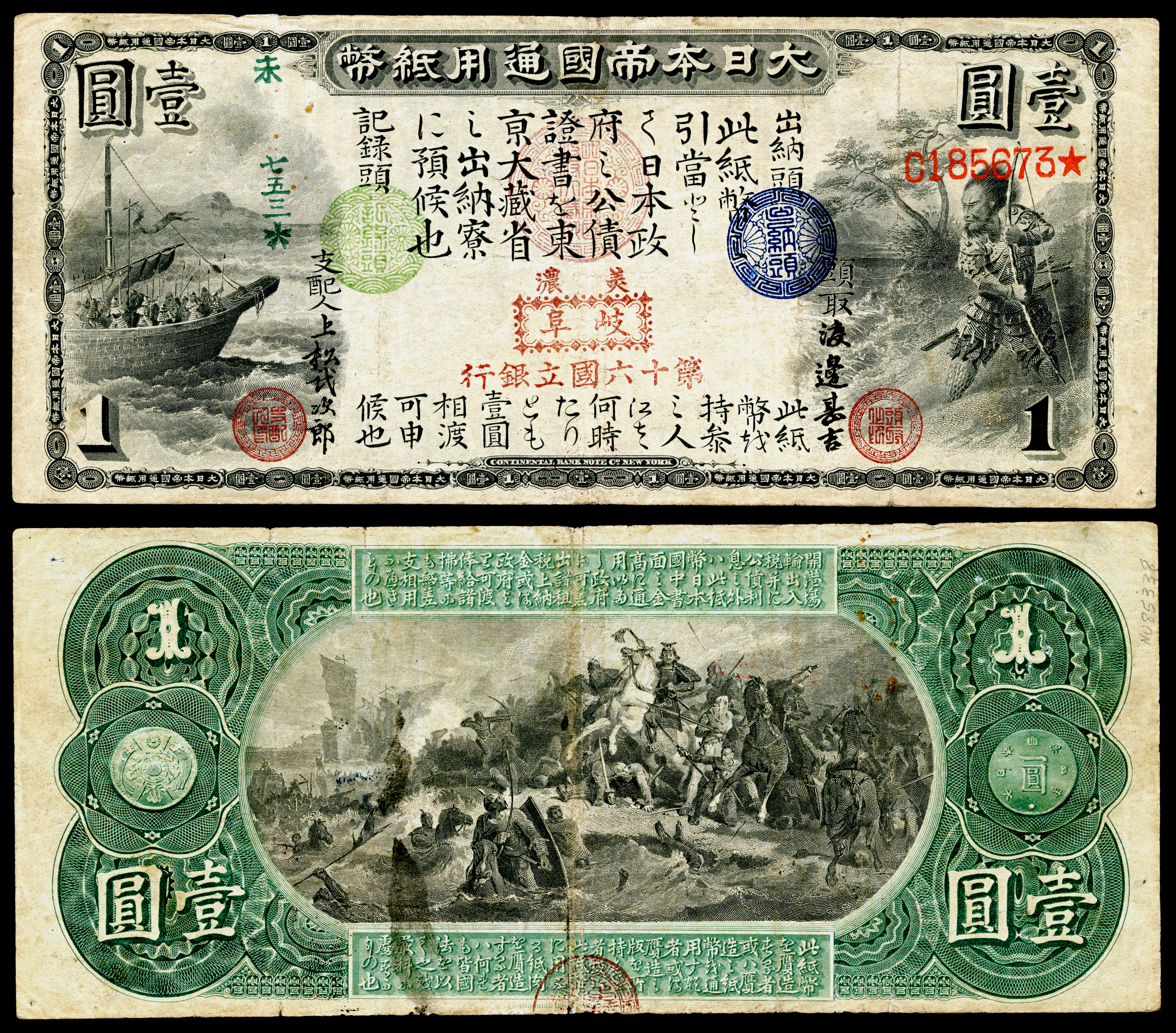
Old national bank note (one yen)

The idea for national bank notes (国立銀行紙幣) in Japan came from Itō Hirobumi when he was studying the United States in 1871. During this time the Meiji government was working to establish a gold-backed monetary system based on Hirobumi's recommendation. The Japanese government accepted Hirobumi's proposal for national bank notes in 1872 by establishing the "National Bank Act" which organized a decentralized "U.S.-style" system of national banks. Each of these banks was chartered by the state to issue notes exchangeable for gold from reserves held by the banks. Permission was eventually given to these private banks allowing national bank notes to be issued in August 1873. The first bank notes issued are also referred to as old national bank notes (旧国立銀行券). One yen national bank notes in particular measure 80 mm x 190 mm in size, and are modeled after their counterparts in the United States. The obverse features samurai Nonoka Okumura (上毛野田道), a warship, and bank seals, while the reverse depicts a Mongol invasion. These circulated as convertible notes for roughly three years before the rising price of gold became an issue. An amendment to the National Bank Act was adopted in August 1876 making the notes inconvertible. Under this amendment there was no limit on the amount of paper money that could be issued. This action also allowed private banks to redeem national bank notes for government issued inconvertible Meiji Tsuho notes rather than for gold. Negative effects from this amendment in the form of inflation were greatly amplified by the Satsuma Rebellion in February 1877. While the rebellion was quickly resolved, the Japanese government had to print a large amount of fiat notes as payment.

National fiat banknotes are also referred to as new national bank notes (新国立銀行券) as they differ from their older counterparts in place of origin. These notes were produced domestically rather than the more difficult task of outsourcing them to the United States for printing. One yen fiat notes measure 74mm x 156mm in size, and are commonly known as sailor one-yen (水兵1円) due to the design. This obverse design depicts two sailors along with seals from the corresponding bank of issuance. The reverse side meanwhile features the Japanese god of fishermen and luck (Ebisu). In July 1877 then prime minister Ōkuma Shigenobu realized that keeping Japan on a gold standard was pointless given the low price of silver. The silver one yen coin was thus brought into domestic commerce on May 27, 1878 switching Japan to a de facto silver standard. This did little good for fiat currency as it continued to lose its value against silver coinage. The issuance of national fiat banknotes was ultimately suspended in 1880 by then prime minister Matsukata Masayoshi. During this time Matsukata introduced a policy of fiscal restraint that resulted in what has come to be called the "Matsukata Deflation". The most significant of these policies established a centralized banking system through the "Bank of Japan Regulation" on June 27, 1882 by proclamation No. 32. In order to decrease inflation all of the old notes were to be collected and exchanged by notes from the central bank. The first step of this process came with an amendment to the regulation in May 1883, which provided the redemption and retirement of national bank notes. As the amount of paper currency in circulation decreased, the amount of silver reserves increased. This drove up the value of paper currency until it was about equal to that of silver coins by the end of 1885. The National Bank Act was amended again in March 1896, providing for the dissolution of the national banks on the expiration of their charters. This amendment also prohibited national bank notes from circulating after December 31, 1899. The ongoing redemption process took additional time as national bank notes were not fully removed from circulation until 1904.

=== Modified "Jingū" Banknotes (1881-1886) ===
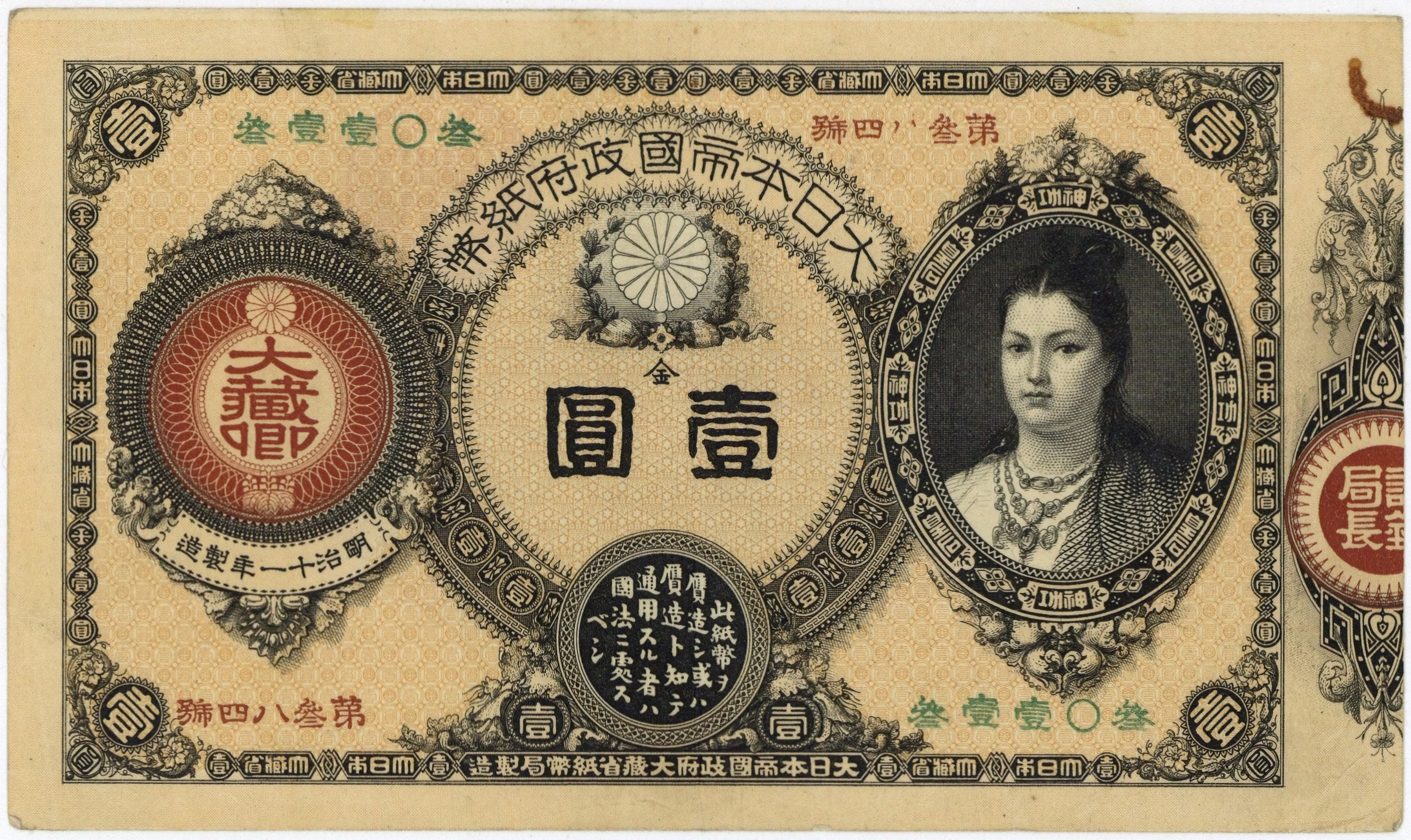
One yen "Jingū" note

Previous Meiji Tsūhō one yen notes were printed using western technology which had its disadvantages in terms of quality. Over time these fragile notes became discolored easily due to the climate of Japan. Counterfeiting was another issue as these thieves eventually found a way around the elaborate Meiji Tsūhō design. The Japanese government took action by releasing a new series referred to as modified banknotes (改造紙幣). Notes for this particular denomination measure 77mm x 131mm in size, and are commonly referred to as Empress Jingu 1-yen notes (神功皇后1円札) because of their design. These notes feature an artist's representation of Empress Jingū that was commissioned by Italian engraver Edoardo Chiossone. This design is notable for being the first portrait on a Japanese banknote, and the only female depicted in the history of Japanese paper currency. Also present on the obverse are counterfeit penalties which were later expanded in the Meiji era. The reverse side meanwhile features inscriptions from the Ministry of Finance, and displays the Treasurer's seal. One yen modified banknotes were released in February 1881 (year 14 of Meiji), and were intended to be exchanged for old Meiji Tsuho notes. During this time inflation hit an all time high due to the amount of non convertible paper currency in circulation (see section above). Measures were put into place which included the establishment of a centralized bank known as the Bank of Japan in 1882. All of the paper money in circulation was to be retired in favor of either silver coinage or newly printed Bank of Japan notes. One yen modified banknotes notes were redeemed for silver starting in January 1886 as production decreased for the series. The Japanese government adopted the gold standard on March 26, 1897 which switched over the redemption of government banknotes from silver to gold. This was followed by a deadline set in June 1898 to prohibit circulation of government notes by the end of the century. Modified one yen "Jingū" banknotes were abolished by the set deadline on December 31, 1899.

== Bank of Japan Notes ==
=== Daikokuten Notes (1885-1958) ===
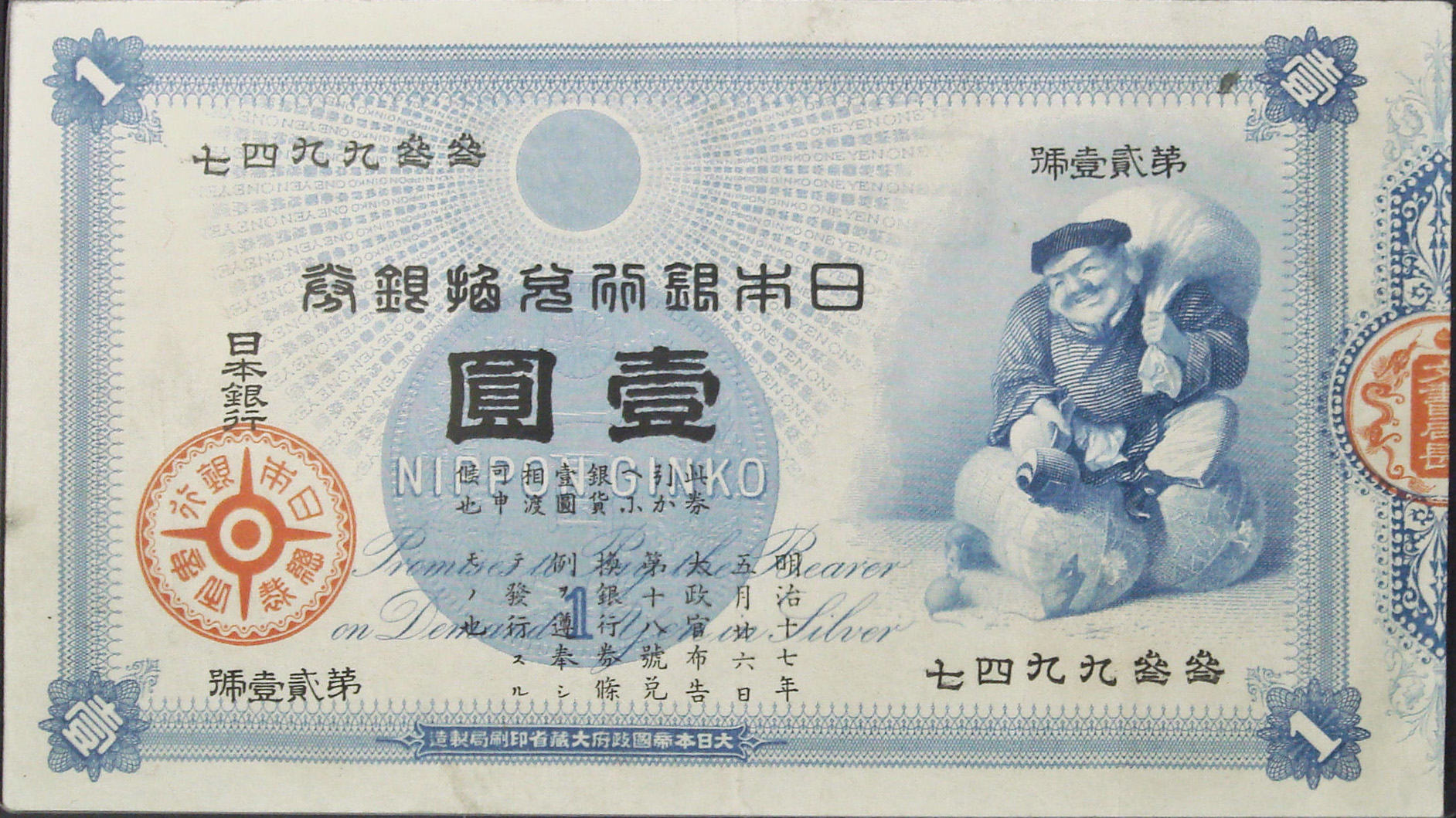
1 yen "Daikokuten" note

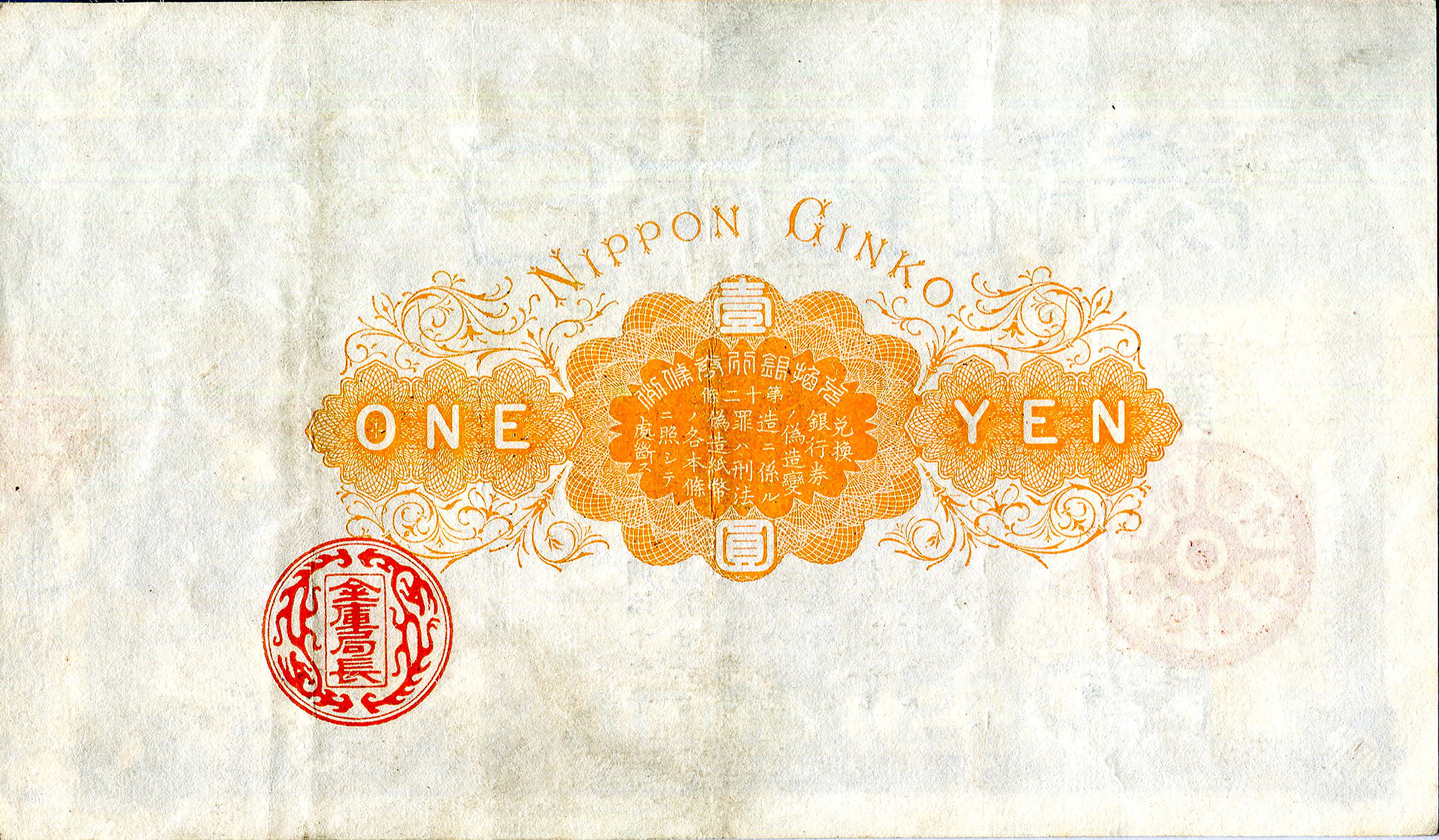
Reverse side showing a colored pattern

During the early 1880s, then prime minister Matsukata Masayoshi was dealing with a serious inflation problem caused by an abundance of circulating devalued currency. On June 27, 1882 Masayoshi suspended the issuance of inconvertible National Bank, and government issued notes to remedy the situation. He then established a new centralized banking system through the "Bank of Japan Regulation" which gave 10 million yen for a new central bank. The Bank of Japan hence commenced operations on October 10, 1882 with the authority to print banknotes that could be exchanged for the old Government and National Bank Notes. The first step towards this process was an amendment made to the regulation in May 1883 which provided the redemption and retirement of national bank notes. New banknotes could not be issued during this time as there was an imbalance between existing coins and notes in regards to silver. It took another year before the redemption of old paper currency stabilized the price of silver alloy.

The Japanese government established a convertible bank note system by Dajo-kwan Notification No. 18 in May 1884. Concurrently, the amount of old paper currency in circulation decreased allowing the amount of silver reserves to grow. This drove up the value of paper currency until it was about equal to that of silver coins by the end of 1885. There is a disagreement among sources on the exact release date of the new Bank of Japan 1 yen notes. Older sources give a date somewhere in "May 1885" with one source specifically pointing to May 9, 1885. Newer sources on the other hand such as the Bank of Japan website officially give a release date of September 8, 1885. In either case Japan was placed on a silver standard with laws enacted to issue silver for the notes starting in January 1886.

1 yen notes from this series are commonly called Daikoku 1 yen (大黒一円札) after the lucky god Daikokuten featured in the design. Officially they are referred to as former convertible banknotes (旧兌換銀行券) in relation to events that occurred since their release. (Note: The Bank of Japan no longer honors the obligation to convert yen into silver.) These 1 yen notes measure 78mm X 135mm in size and were designed by Italian engraver Edoardo Chiossone. Daikokuten is featured on the obverse with the inscription NIPPON GINKO Promises to Pay the Bearer on Demand One Yen in Silver (此券引きかへ尓銀貨壹圓相渡可申候也). The reverse meanwhile features a colored pattern with the value written in English, and counterfeit penalties written in Kanji. Security features include a character watermark that reads "Bank of Japan Note" when held up to a light source.

Design flaws with 1 yen Daikoku notes caused the series to only be printed and produced for a brief time. One of these defects involved the addition of "konjac powder" to increase the strength of the bill. This powder wound up attracting rats and insects which would easily damage the bills by chewing on them. Another issue had to due with the "blue ink" in the watermark that was used to prevent counterfeiting. The ink used was mixed with white lead as a pigment which caused the notes to turn black when they reacted with hydrogen sulfide in hot spring areas. When the Japanese government adopted an official gold standard in 1897, the silver yen was abolished. 1 yen Daikoku notes were gradually withdrawn afterwards in exchange for subsidiary silver currency. The notes though were not suspended from issuance (de jure) until October 1, 1958 (year 33 of Shōwa). These notes are still legal tender today making them the oldest valid currency in Japan. They remain unused in circulation as their collector's value far exceeds their face value.

=== Modified Convertible Banknotes (1889-1958) ===
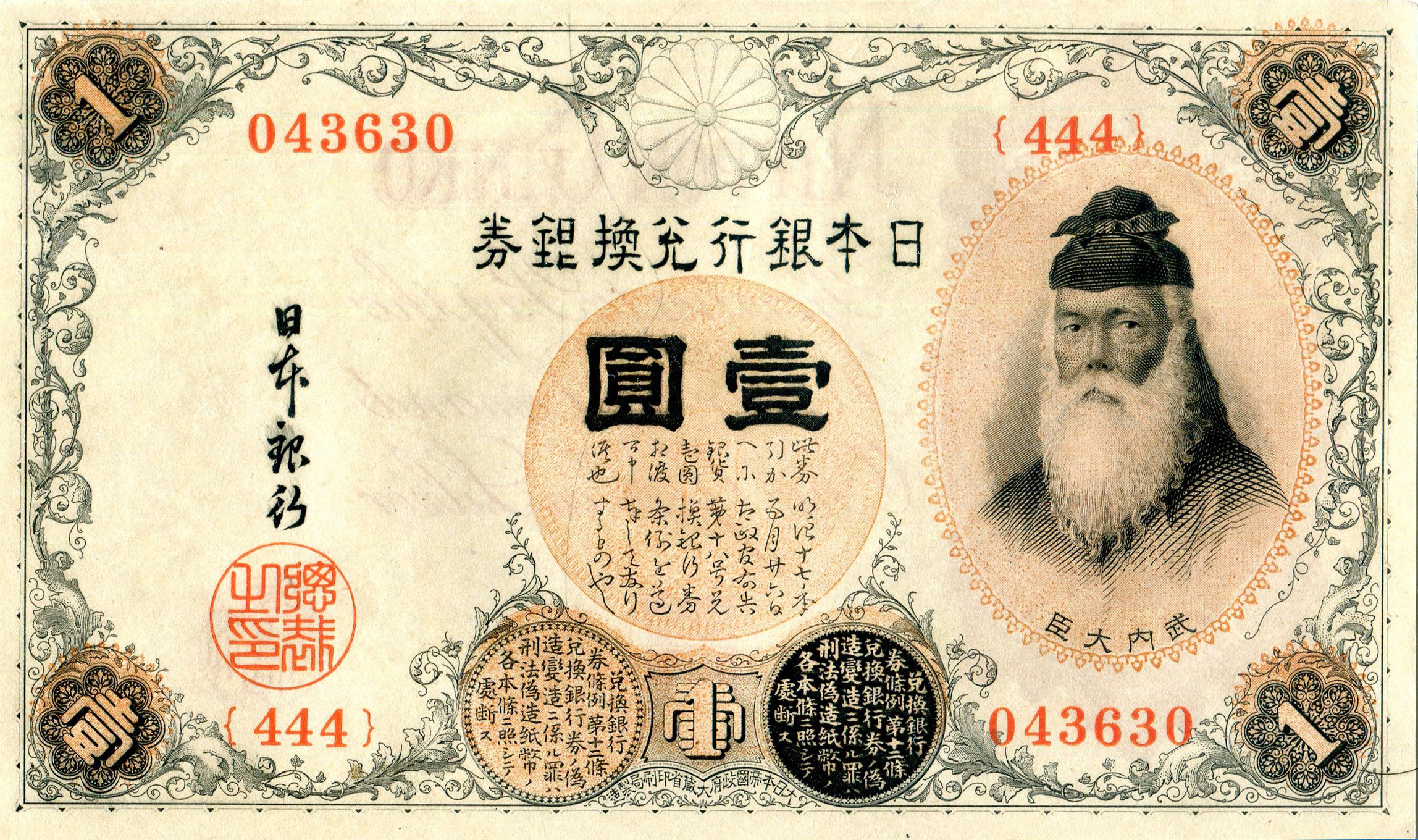
"Arabic one yen" note from 1916 (obverse) (Note: Note the Arabic serial numbers and the "{444}" block number.)

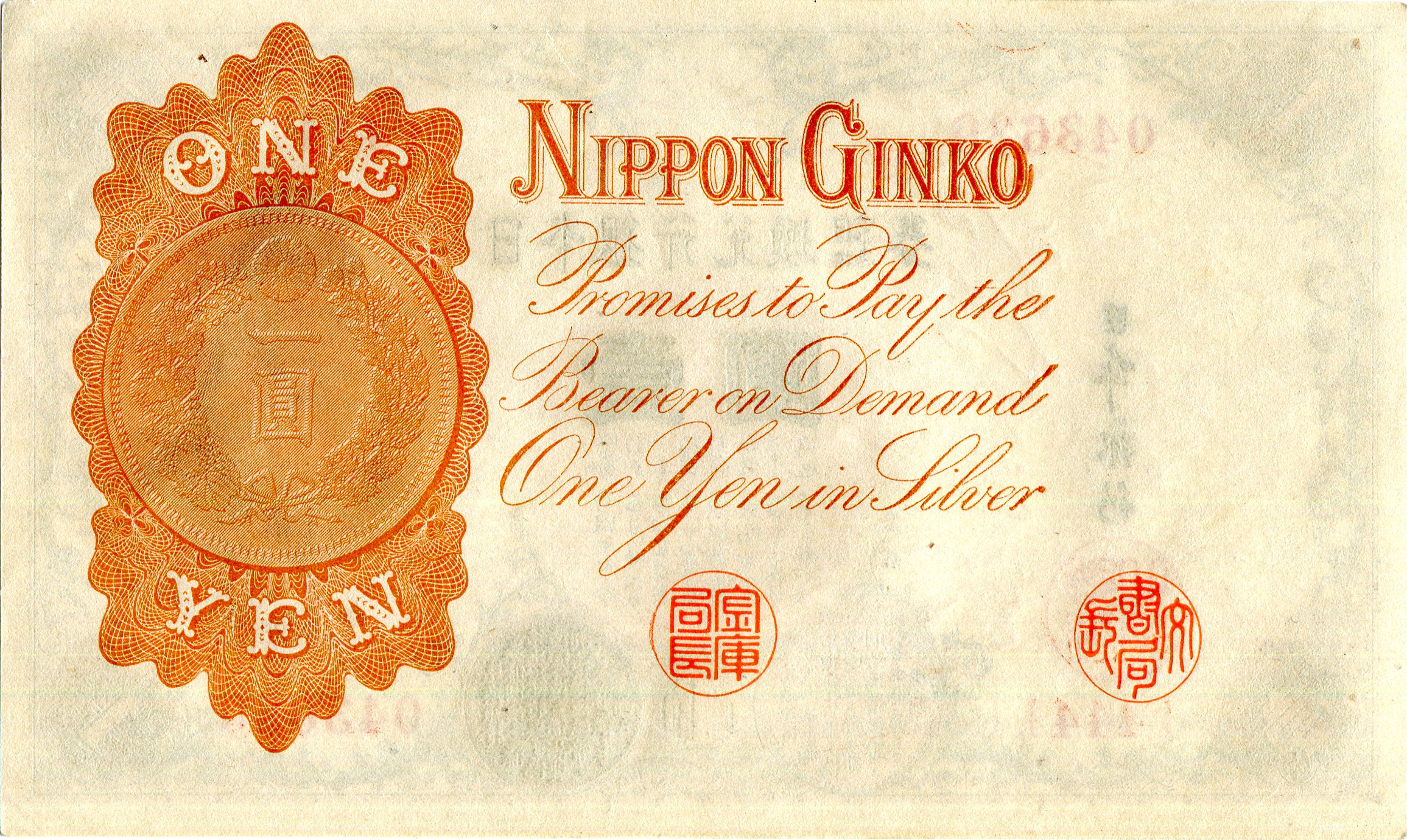
Reverse side showing a one yen silver coin

On May 1, 1889 (22nd year of Meiji) the Bank of Japan printed new one yen silver certificates to replace the old "Daikokuten" notes. This action had to be undertaken to address design flaws which caused the latter series to be eaten and discolored. Modified one yen notes are now officially referred to as former convertible banknotes (旧兌換銀行券) in relation to events that occurred since their release. This series is broken up into two different varieties called Kanji one yen (漢数字1円) and Arabic one yen (アラビア数字一円) aka Taishō one yen banknotes (大正兌換銀行券1円). Kanji one yen notes were the first variety to be released as the serial numbers are written in kanji. Notes from this series all measure 85mm X 145mm in size, and feature legendary Japanese hero-statesman Takenouchi no Sukune on the obverse. With this legendary figure are inscriptions in three circles that reference the convertible wording, the Dajo-kwan Notification of 1884 (year 17 of Meiji), and counterfeit penalties. The reverse side of the notes meanwhile feature a contemporary one yen silver coin with the convertible wording written in English. Security features include paulownia watermarks, and the words "Silver Standard One Yen Bill" when held up to a light source. Originally these notes were intended to be silver certificates that could be converted through a bank transaction into a one yen silver coin. Problems arose when foreign countries left the silver standard leading to a large increase in worldwide silver production. As the price of silver dropped the value of the silver yen went along with it causing inflation. The Japanese government was now eager to drop the silver standard in favor of something more sustainable.

An opportunity for change came in the aftermath of the First Sino-Japanese War as the Japanese government received a large compensation. This compensation was used to mint gold coins as the government switched from a silver standard to a gold standard. Japan officially switched to this adopted gold standard on October 1, 1897 (year 30) and all of the silver one yen coins were demonetized. Kanji one yen notes were gradually withdrawn afterwards in exchange for subsidiary silver currency. The second variety of notes were issued during Emperor Taishō's reign due to effects caused by World War I. More banknotes were needed during this time as a booming economy caused the demand for Japanese products to increase. Arabic or Taishō one yen notes were issued on August 15, 1916 (year 5 of Taishō) with no changes other than the Arabic printed serial numbers. These notes were convertible to silver only in practice as no silver was present in the bank's note reserve. The effects of the war caused a silver subsidiary coin shortage which prompted the issuance of fractional currency in denominations of 10, 20, and 50 sen notes. One yen silver coins were "practically nonexistent" by this time as larger sums in yen were negotiated by banknotes. It was recorded on November 17, 1917 that one yen notes in particular were hoarded due to the scarcity of subsidiary coinage. At some point in time these notes were not de facto issued anymore as they were replaced by a new series in 1943. Modified convertible one yen banknotes were ultimately suspended from issuance (de jure) on October 1, 1958 (year 33 of Shōwa). While these notes are still legal tender today, they remain unused in circulation as their collector's value far exceeds their face value.

=== First issue series (1943-1958) ===
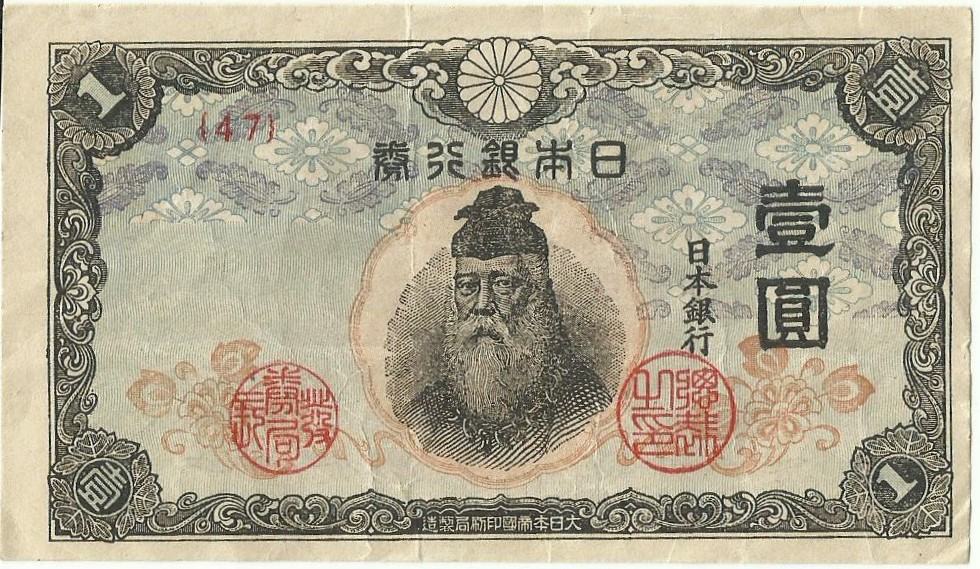
First issue series obverse (type 2: 1944)

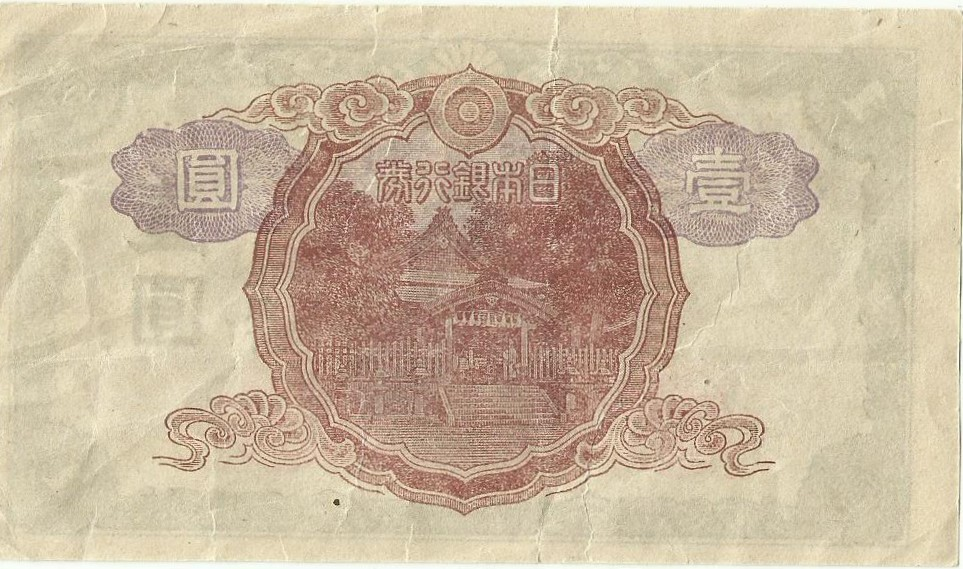
Reverse showing Ube shrine

The "Bank of Japan Act" was promulgated on February 24, 1942 allowing the Bank of Japan to be re-organized to reflect the reality of World War II. This act empowered the Bank of Japan to release nonconvertible notes in denominations of 1, 5, 10, and eventually 100 yen as fiat currency. These notes are part of the First issue series (い号券), which is a collective term for notes issued after the Bank of Japan was re-organized. One yen notes from this series measure 81 mm x 142 mm in size, and are also called Chuo Takenouchi one yen (中央武内1円) after their design. This design features Japanese hero-statesman Takenouchi no Sukune on the obverse, and Ube shrine on the reverse. Chuo Takenouchi one yen notes were released into circulation on December 15, 1943 (18th year of Shōwa). These notes were manufactured in poor condition due to budget cuts made in preparation for the war. Changes to production included a shift from mitsumata paper material to pulp as mitsumata required more time and labor to manufacture. Other changes involved the simplification of printing, raw materials, and design patterns as personnel and materials were in short supply. Security features were added in the form of paulownia watermarks when held up to a light source. Overall, the issuance of fiat currency was strongly criticized by the public as the Japanese government abandoned its promise to convert paper money to gold.

As the war intensified the Japanese government tried drastically to reduce costs by simplifying the notes even more. This effort created a second variety as the serial numbers were omitted on November 20, 1944 (year 19) to save labor in printing. Notes from the second variety are virtually identical to the ones issued in 1943 other than a missing serial number. Non visible changes involved the printing of the symbols with the bank seals for efficiency with a simplified watermark. The overall amount of Bank of Japan notes in circulation after the war became an issue due to rampant inflation. In order to control the situation a process known as new yen switching (新円切替) was implemented by the Shidehara Cabinet. By March 9, 1946 it was reported by the International Monetary Fund that all notes issued by the Bank of Japan had been surrendered for a one to one conversion into new yen notes. Chuo Takenouchi one yen notes remained legal tender as they were not invalidated with the other denominations. In either case the re-introduction of the one yen coin in 1948 (year 23) was the beginning of the end for the one yen note. This series was eventually suspended from issuance (de jure) on October 1, 1958 (year 33) when the amount of coins in circulation became sustainable. While these notes are still legal tender today, they remain unused in circulation as their collector's value exceeds their face value.

=== A series (1946-1958) ===
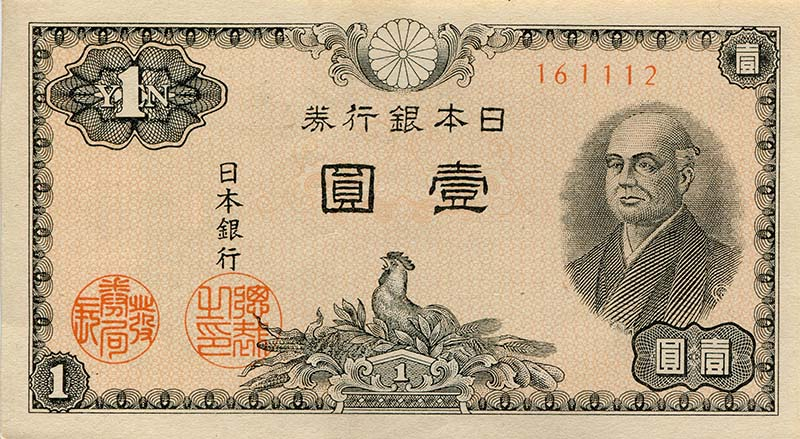
"A series" obverse showing Ninomiya Sontoku

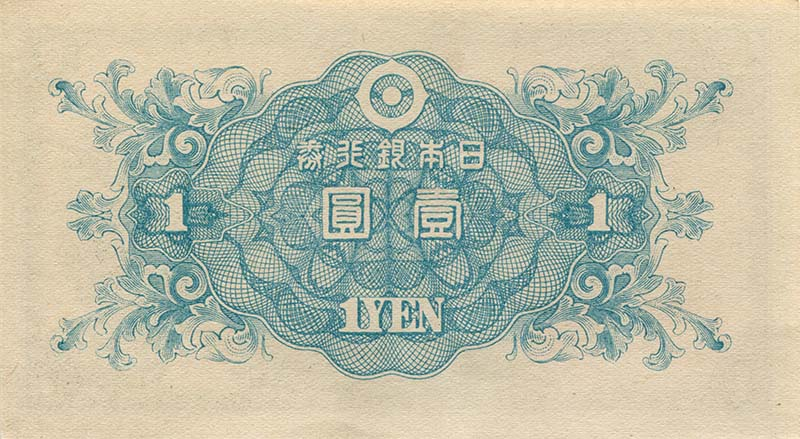
"A series" reverse with a colored pattern

Notes from the "A series" (A号券) were the last denomination of "one yen" to be issued as paper currency in Japan. When World War II ended the amount of banknotes issued compared to before the war had more than tripled. This was due to factors such as wartime compensation, payment of retirement allowances to veterans, and refunds due to forced deposits and savings made during the war. All of these things had a negative effect on the Japanese economy due to rampant inflation and the devaluation of the yen. In order to control the situation a process known as new yen switching (新円切替) was implemented by the Shidehara Cabinet. The "A series" acted as renewal currency when banknotes were issued in denominations of 1, 5, 10, and 100 yen throughout 1946 (21st year of Shōwa). One yen notes are also referred to as "Ninomiya 1-yen banknotes" (買取価格が高い二宮1円) as the obverse features agricultural leader Ninomiya Sontoku. The reverse side meanwhile uses a colored pattern ripple design with "1 Yen" written in English. This design had to be approved by the Supreme Commander for the Allied Powers (GHQ) before it was implemented for use. These notes were issued both by the Bank of Japan and the Japanese government in name only, as production and printing was outsourced to the private sector.

By March 9, 1946 it was reported by the International Monetary Fund that all notes issued by the Bank of Japan had been surrendered for a one to one conversion into new yen notes. One yen notes from the "A series" measure 68mm x 124mm in size and were poorly made due to post-war conditions. When the notes were released into circulation on March 19, 1946 they were prone to counterfeiting as there were no protective watermarks. To make matters worse, there were quality differences depending on where the notes were printed and produced which helped forgery to spread. The notes were not in circulation for long before Japanese coinage was reformed in 1948 (year 23) with the issue of a brass one-yen coin. Inflation was gradually stabilized by a monetary tightening policy called "Dodge Line", which was announced on March 7, 1949. One yen notes from the "A series" were eventually discontinued in 1956 (year 31) as aluminum one yen coins were now circulating. They were finally suspended from issuance (de jure) on October 1, 1958 (year 33) when the amount of coins in circulation became sustainable. While one yen notes from the "A series" are still legal tender today, they remain unused in circulation as their collector's value exceeds their face value.

== Watermarks ==
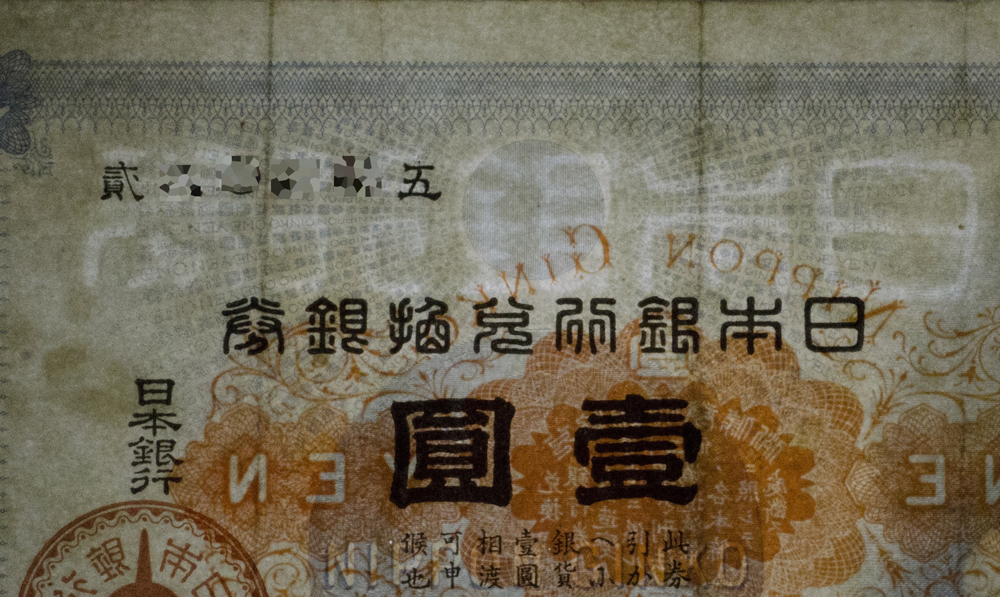
Daikoku one yen bill with watermark reading: "Bank of Japan note" (read from right to left)

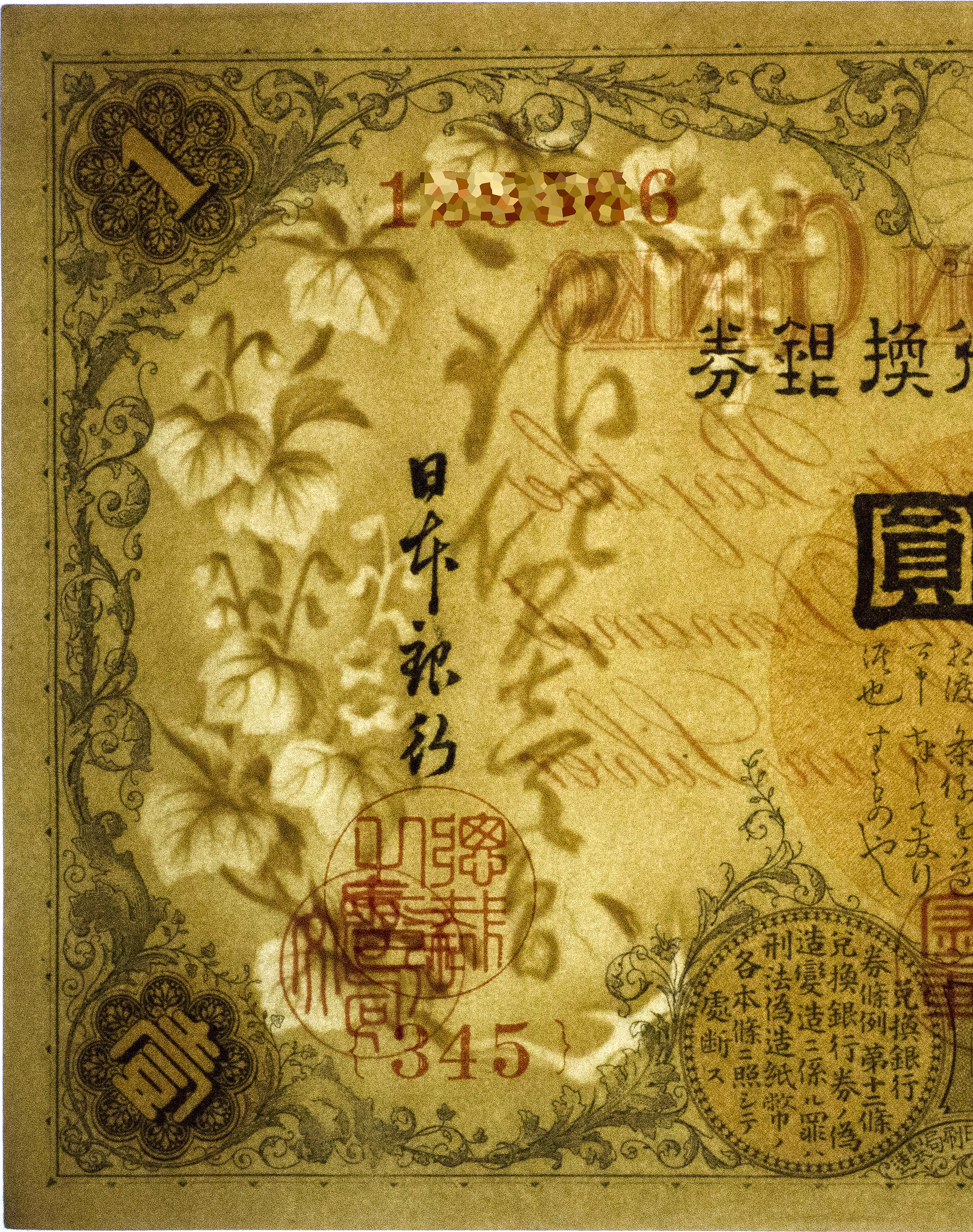
Remodeled one yen bill showing Paulownia and "Silver Standard One Yen Bill" watermarks

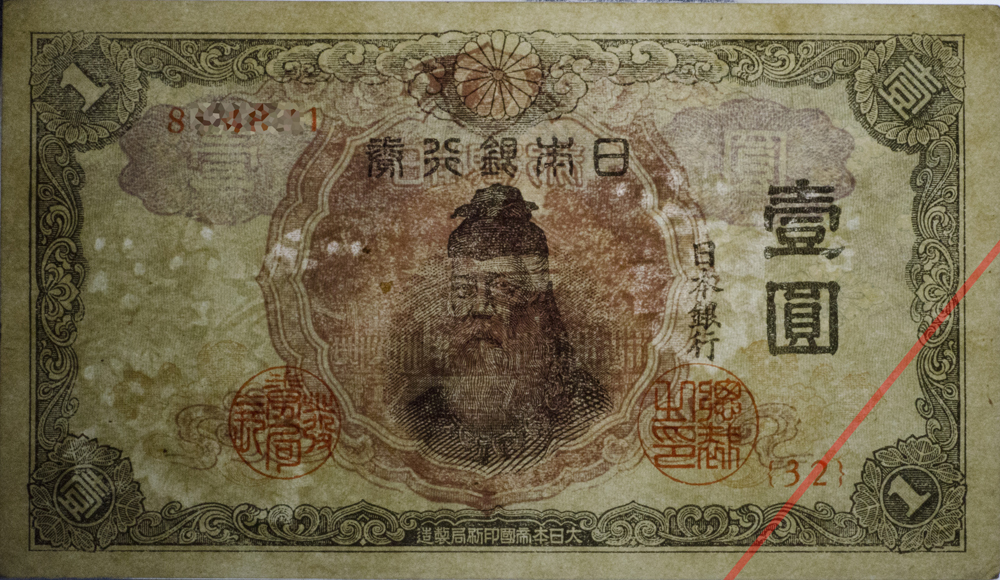
First issue series showing Paulownia watermarks

== Collecting ==
The value of any given banknote is determined by survivability rate and condition as collectors in general prefer original notes with bright rich coloring. In contrast to this are notes with ink stains, missing pieces, and evidence of repairs which can all impact their value. Exceptions to this include extremely rare banknotes where there are few surviving examples (ex: National Gold Bank Note). The oldest one yen notes include the Meiji Tsūhō series which were first issued in 1872 and later abolished in 1899. These were mostly made in Germany with a print run of 39,814,943 notes from in Frankfurt, and 5,394,916 notes made in Japan during their fifteen year use in commerce. This combined figure is the third highest print run after the smaller denomination Meiji Tsūhō 10 and 20 sen notes. Notes from the one yen denomination are thus easier to obtain as they were made in relatively large amounts. Many of the surviving examples are in better conditions due to a portion being made domestically. These notes can be obtained in average condition for 6,000+ yen (~$60+ USD), with prices reaching 100,000 yen (~$1,000 USD) for examples in top conditions. Professional grading is recommended for this series as "many" counterfeit notes exist on the market. The next series are National Bank Notes issued from 1873 to 1880 in two different varieties. Both of these "old" and "new" national one yen banknote varieties are now rare due to events surrounding the aftermath of the Satsuma Rebellion in 1877. In order to pay for this event a large amount of banknotes were printed and released into circulation as a way to ease the economic situation. This wound up having a negative effect in the form of rampant inflation which caused National banknotes to be actively collected by officials. These are now popular banknotes among collectors which are rarely seen on the marketplace. When they are up for the sale, one yen national bank notes sell in the hundreds of thousands of yen ($1,000s USD) in average condition. It is recommended that ungraded notes be checked for authenticity given their rarity. The final government series include one yen Modified "Jingū" Banknotes issued from 1881 to 1886. These are also popular as they are Japan's first portrait-filled banknote. "Jingū" one yen notes are scarcely valued in the tens to hundreds of thousands of yen ($100s-$1000s USD) depending on condition as they were not issued for a long period of time.

Daikokuten one yen notes were part of the first series to be issued by the newly formed Bank of Japan in 1885. These were not in circulation for long as they suffered from design defects which later prompted the issuance of replacement notes. As these were the first notes released by the bank of Japan they now boast a considerable premier element. The value of "Daikokuten" one yen notes range from the tens of thousands of yen in average condition ($100s USD), to hundreds of thousands of yen in top conditions. Replacement modified convertible banknotes were issued from 1889 to 1917 in two different varieties by serial number appearance. One yen notes from the first series are called Kanji one yen (漢数字1円), and are often sold on the market in average condition. These notes become rare when found in uncirculated grades with values in the hundreds of thousands of yen ($1,000s USD). The second variety is referred to as Taishō one yen banknotes (大正兌換銀行券1円), and are valued by their block numbers (ex: "{254}"). Notes with low block numbers are valued the most when compared to those with "{200}" and higher. The next series is known as the "First issue" which was released during World War II in two different varieties. These notes are inexpensive and are commonly collected with the exception of "SPECIMEN" notes. Finally, notes from the last "A series" are valued according to their serial number in a matter similar to 50 sen "B series" notes. The most valuable notes have serial numbers ending in "13", "32", "42" and "44". Notes issued on behalf of the Bank of Japan have "1" as the first serial digit, while government issued notes use the first digit "2". All of these notes are now considered to be collector's items. As such, spending one yen banknotes issued by the Bank of Japan is not advised due to the financial loss incurred by doing so.

== See also ==
- Bank of Japan
- Banknotes of the Japanese yen
- Silver certificate (United States)
