= 20 sen note =

Denomination of Japanese currency

- Country: Japan
- Value: 1/5 Japanese yen
- Years of printing: 1872–1919 (Note: Non consecutive)

Obverse
- Design: Various designs depending on the series.

Reverse
- Design: Various designs depending on the series.

The 20 sen note (二十銭紙幣) was a denomination of Japanese yen in three different government issued series from 1872 to 1919 for use in commerce. Meiji Tsūhō notes are the first modern banknotes issued after Japanese officials studied western culture. These notes were replaced due to counterfeting by a redesigned series called "Ōkura-kyō" for "sen" denominations. Both of these series were officially abolished in 1899 in favor of notes issued by the Bank of Japan. Government issued notes only returned during the Taishō era in the form of an emergency issue due to a coin shortage. These were only issued between 1917 and 1919 before they were finally abolished in 1948. Twenty sen notes are now bought and sold as collector's items depending on condition.

== History ==
=== Meiji Tsūhō (1872) ===
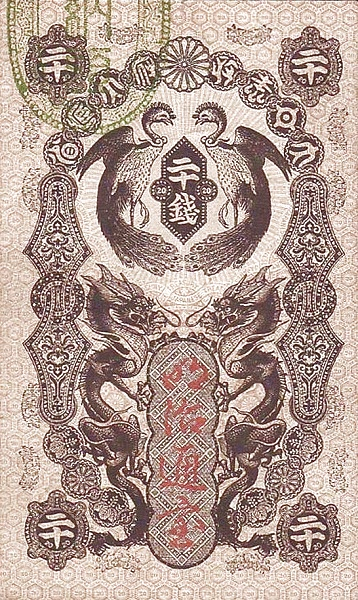
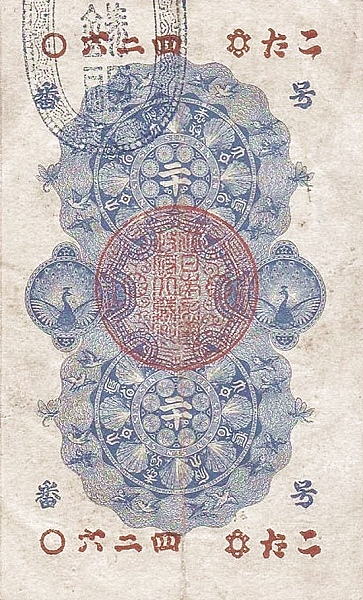
20 Sen "Meiji Tsūhō" note from 1872

The first twenty sen notes adopted and released by the Japanese government are part of a series known as Meiji Tsūhō (明治通宝). Notes from this series are the first Japanese currency ever to be printed using western printing at "Dondorf and Naumann", which was located in Frankfurt. Tomomi Iwakura met with Otto von Bismarck in March 1871 (Meiji 4) as part of the Iwakura Mission to study western culture. The "Paper Money Office" (known today as the National Printing Bureau) was later established in July of that year following the abolition of the han system. This entity was later organized into the "Paper Money Bureau" in January 1872. Incomplete banknotes manufactured by Dondorf Naumann began to arrive from Germany around the same time. These notes were left incomplete for security reasons which required the words "Meiji Tsuho" and the mark of the Minister of Finance to be supplemented and printed at the Paper Money Bureau. Woodblock printing was eventually employed to save hundreds of people the work of handwriting the characters "Meiji Tsuho" on each individual note. These twenty sen notes were eventually released in April, 1872 (year 5) giving Japan a westernized currency system to go with the recently established yen. All of the old former government and clan banknotes were intended for exchange upon the issuance of the new currency. Meiji Tsūhō notes were given an elaborate design that was difficult to forge as counterfeiting was previously rampant with these clan notes. These thieves eventually adapted to these changes by legally obtaining unstamped Meiji Tsūhō notes sent to Japan from Germany. Normally Japanese officials would add stamps to the notes finalizing the process, where in this case the counterfeiters added their own stamps. Counterfeiting and issues with paper quality led the Japanese government to issue redesigned twenty sen banknotes in 1882. The old Meiji Tsūhō twenty sen notes were eventually phased out in exchange for subsidiary silver coinage before being abolished on December 9, 1899.

=== Ōkura-kyō series (1882) ===
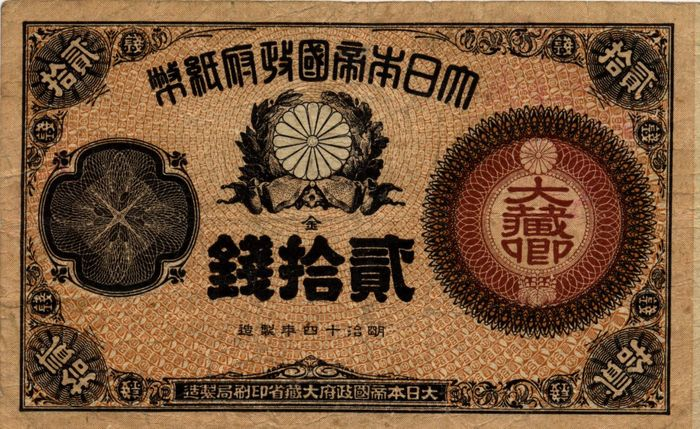
Ōkura-kyō 20 sen obverse

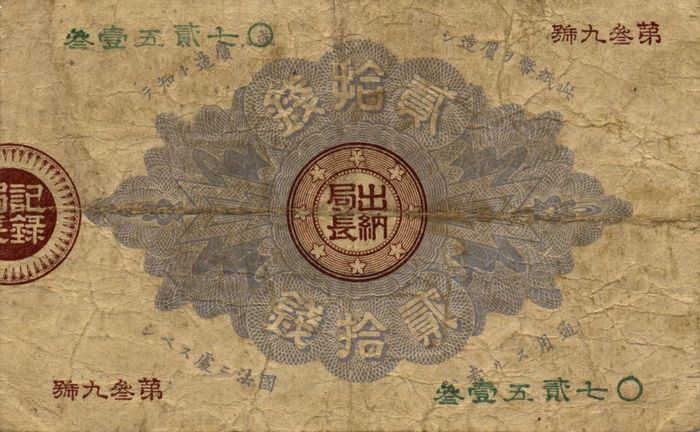
Ōkura-kyō 20 sen reverse

Previous Meiji Tsūhō twenty sen notes were printed using western technology which had its disadvantages in terms of quality. Over time these fragile notes became discolored easily due to the climate of Japan. Counterfeiting was another issue as these thieves eventually found a way around the elaborate Meiji Tsūhō design. This was done by legally purchasing unstamped notes from Germany as mentioned in the section above. Twenty sen notes from this series are referred to as Ōkura-kyō (大蔵卿20銭) aka 改造紙幣20銭, as the seal of the Chief administrator of the Ministry of the Treasury is featured on the obverse design. The reverse side features a serial number and counterfeit penalties which were later expanded in the Meiji era until May 8, 1897 (year 30). These notes were issued in a hurry as they were not originally planned to be a part of this redesigned note series. The redesigned yen denominations feature an artist's representation of Empress Jingū that was commissioned by Italian engraver Edoardo Chiossone. This "portrait" was omitted from twenty sen notes in favor of a simple design that could be completed more quickly to meet scheduling.

The series as a whole was still considered to be "extremely decorative" and received top-class reputation internationally. These notes were made as a countermeasure against counterfeiting by using the best technology available at the time. New paper called "mitsumata" was domestically produced for the notes by the National Printing Bureau. Twenty sen notes were printed with dimensions of 59 mm x 93 mm with a watermark which made them difficult to forge. When these twenty sen notes were issued to the public in December 1882 (year 15) they were widely favored. The "Convertible Bank-notes Law" was adopted in May 1884 which provided the issuance of Bank of Japan notes in denominations of yen. This law allowed Bank of Japan notes to be exchangeable for silver coinage, and was promulgated to gradually convert government issued currency (redesigned series) into silver after 1886. The Japanese government adopted the gold standard on March 26, 1897, which switched over the redemption of government banknotes from silver to gold. It was during this time that the government decided to end the circulation of government issued banknotes by the end of the century. Twenty sen Ōkura-kyō notes were thus abolished on December 31, 1899 (year 32) along with other government banknotes.

=== Taishō fractional notes (1917–1919) ===
Twenty sen coins were last produced in 1911 in the 44th year of Emperor Meiji's reign and he died in the following year. Emperor Taishō was enthroned roughly two years before World War I broke out. This event brought Japan a booming economy through a special demand for goods leading to a large trade surplus. The negative effects from this event included an increased demand for subsidiary coins which led to a coin shortage. Silver bullion to make silver subsidiary coins also rose above their face value which posed a financial challenge to the mint. To remedy the situation an imperial ordinance was promulgated on October 29, 1917, issuing fractional currency in the amount of thirty million yen. Actual issuance occurred in the following month with the notes being legal tender up to ten yen. The series as a whole is known as Taishō fractional notes (大正小額政府紙幣), which were issued at the time by the treasury rather than the Bank of Japan as the series was considered an emergency issue. Taishō era twenty sen notes measure 92 mm x 58 mm in size and have a black and green hue. The obverse side of the notes feature the Finance Minister's seal and chrysanthemum flower emblem, while on the reverse is decorated in a colored pattern. There is a central feature on the reverse side which mentions counterfeit penalties (1 year imprisonment or 200,000 yen fine) enforced by law.

It was initially agreed that the notes would be bound by a restriction stating that they could only be issued until one year after the end of the war. This date came and went as World War I ended in November 1918 (year 7) and the new year began. It was ultimately decided to allow the issuance to continue for a while longer as there was still a shortage in coinage. Twenty sen Taishō notes have the shortest production run as they were only issued until 1919 (8th year of Taishō). These were later suspended with other denominations on April 1, 1921, with exceptions made for people who wanted to exchange "soiled or damaged" notes. Twenty sen coins were abandoned during this time after efforts to re-establish a reduced silver coin failed. Rapid inflation caused by World War II eventually rendered Taishō twenty sen notes worthless and obsolete. The notes held on to their legal tender status until August 31, 1948, when they were abolished. Subsidiary coinage and currency as a whole was eventually demonetized at the end of 1953 when the Japanese government passed a law abolishing it in favor of the yen. Currencies of less than one yen were rarely used by this time anyway due to the excessive post-war inflation.

== Collecting ==
The value of any given banknote is determined by survivability rate and condition as collectors in general prefer original notes with bright rich coloring. In contrast to this are notes with ink stains, missing pieces, and evidence of repairs which can all impact the value of any given note. The oldest twenty sen notes include the Meiji Tsūhō series issued from 1872 to 1887. These were all made in Germany with a print run of 46,100,557 notes during their fifteen-year use in commerce. The amount printed is in the middle when compared to the three different denominations of sen (10 sen, 20 sen, and 50 sen), and "many" were used. "Expensive" purchases can be expected for quality as the amount of surviving banknotes remain in mostly worn grades. These notes can be obtained in average condition for 2500+ yen (~$25+ USD) with prices ranging in the 10,000s of yen ($100+ USD) for examples in high grades. Professional grading is recommended for this series as "many" counterfeit notes exist on the market. The next series are Ōkura-kyō (redesigned) notes issued from 1882 to 1899 in several different denominations. Twenty sen notes in particular were issued in a large amount which makes them the least expensive of the series. Even so, the notes are valued in the high thousands of yen in average condition to the tens of thousand in high grades. The last twenty sen notes issued for commerce were Taishō fractional notes from 1917 (Taishō year 6) to 1919 (Taishō year 8). Average condition notes can be collected for less than 1,000 yen (<$10 USD), but prices soar with pristine 1917 (year 6) examples.

== See also ==
- Banknotes of the Japanese yen
- Bank of Japan
- Dai-Ichi Ginko Korean notes - similar in appearance to Meiji Tsūhō notes.
