= Fabio Rambelli =

Italian academic, author and editor

Fabio Rambelli (born 15 June 1963) is an Italian academic, author and editor. He is a professor in the Department of Religious Studies at the University of California, Santa Barbara (UCSB).

== Early life ==
Rambelli was born in Ravenna, Italy. He earned a BA in Japanese language and culture from the University of Venice. In 1992, he was awarded his PhD in East Asian Studies from the University of Venice and the Italian Ministry of Scientific Research. He also studied at the Oriental Institute in Naples and at the Tokyo University of Foreign Studies.

== Career ==
In 2001, Rambelli was a professor of religious studies, cultural studies, and Japanese religions at Sapporo University in Japan.

His scholarly perspective construes

"late medieval and early modern Shinto as the result of complex processes involving both the localization of Buddhism (as a translocal religion) in Japan and the opening of the Japanese tradition to several Asian intellectual trends (such as Neo-Confucianism and Daoism from China, but also Neo-Brahmanism from India), together with an enhanced awareness of cultural identity and specificities.

At present, Rambelli holds the International Shinto Foundation Chair in Shinto Studies at UCSB.

== Selected works ==
In a statistical overview derived from writings by and about Fabio Rambelli, OCLC/WorldCat encompasses roughly 9 works in 20+ publications in 2 languages and 700+ library holdings.

=== Selected books ===
- イタリア的考え方: 日本人のためのイタリア入門 (1997)
- Reconfiguring Cultural Semiotics: the Construction of Japanese Identity (2000)
- Vegetal Buddhas: Ideological Effects of Japanese Buddhist Doctrines on the Salvation of Inanimate Beings (2001)
- Buddhas and Kami in Japan honji suijaku as a Combinatory Paradigm (2002)
- イタリア的 : 「南」の魅力 (2005)
- 南の思想: 地中海的思考への誘い (2006)
- Buddhist Materiality: a Cultural History of Objects in Japanese Buddhism (2007)

=== Selected articles ===
From the author's CV

- “The Dangerous Kami Called Buddha: Ancient Conflicts Between Buddhism and Local Cults and Medieval Attempts at Resolution,” Pacific World, Third Series, n. 12, Fall 2010, pp. 147–169.
- Rambelli, Fabio (2011). "Sémiotique bouddhiste: Perspectives et questions ouvertes1". Protée. 39 (2): 9–18. doi:10.7202/1007164ar.
- Fabio, Rambelli (2011). "Sada Kaiseki: An Alternative Discourse on Buddhism, Modernity, and Nationalism in the Early Meiji Period". Politics and Religion in Modern Japan. pp. 104–142. doi:10.1057/9780230336681_5. ISBN 978-1-349-31659-5.
- “Uchinaru tabunkashugi” 内なる多文化主義. In Mitarai Shōji 御手洗昭治, Ogasawara Haruno 小笠原はるの, Fabio Rambelli ファビオ・ランベッリ, Tabunka kōryū jidai e no chōsen 多文化交流時代への挑戦. Tokyo: Yumani shobō, 2011, pp. 132–184.
- Rambelli, Fabio (2009). ""Dog-men," Craftspeople or Living Buddhas? The Status of Yamabushi in Pre-modern Japanese Society". Cahiers d'Extrême-Asie. 18: 123–139. doi:10.3406/asie.2009.1334.
- “Shinto and Esoteric Buddhism,” in Esoteric Buddhism and the Tantras in East Asia, ed. by Charles Orzech, Leiden: Brill, 2011, pp. 834–844.
- “Home Buddhas: Historical Processes and Modes of Representation of the Sacred in the Japanese Buddhist Family Altar (butsudan),” Japanese Religion vol. 35/1-2, Spring and Fall 2010, pp. 63–86.
- “The Story of Prince Rama in Japan: Sources and Transformations.” In Ramayana in Focus: Visual and Performing Arts of Asia. Ed. By Gauri Parimoo Krishnan. Singapore: Asian Civilisation Museum, 2010, pp. 28–37.
- Rambelli, Fabio (2006). "Re-positioning the Gods: "Medieval Shintō" and the Origins of Non-Buddhist Discourses on the Kami". Cahiers d'Extrême-Asie. 16: 305–325. doi:10.3406/asie.2006.1261.
- Fabio Rambelli (2009). "Before the First Buddha: Medieval Japanese Cosmogony and the Quest for the Primeval Kami". Monumenta Nipponica. 64 (2): 235–271. doi:10.1353/mni.0.0080. S2CID 162249225.
- Fabio Rambelli and Eric Reinders, “What Does Iconoclasm Create? What Does Preservation Destroy? Reflections on Iconoclasm in East Asia,” in Iconoclasm: Contested Objects, Contested Terms. Ed. Stacy Boldrick and Richard Clay. London: Ashgate, 2007, pp. 15–33
- “Buddhist Republican Thought and Institutions in Japan: Preliminary Considerations,” in Japanese Studies Around the World 2008, Special Issue “Scholars of Buddhism in Japan: Buddhist Studies in the 21st Century.” Kyoto: International Research Center for Japanese Studies, (March 2009), pp. 127–153.
- “Nihon shisoshi ni okeru ‘Indotekinaru mono’ no saihyoka no tame" (Teigen) 日本思想史における「インド的なるもの」の再評価のため, Nihon shisoshigaku 『日本思想史学』vol. 38, September 2006, pp. 55–64
- “‘Just Behave as You Like’: Radical Amida Cults and Popular Religiosity in Premodern Japan,” in Richard K. Payne and Kenneth K. Tanaka, eds., “Approaching the Land of Bliss: Religious Praxis in the Cult of Amitabha.” Honolulu: University of Hawai’i Press, 2004, pp. 169–201
- “The Ritual World of Buddhist ‘Shinto’: The Reikiki and Initiations on Kami-related Matters (jingi kanjo) in Late Medieval and Early-Modern Japan,” Japanese Journal of Religious Studies 29/3-4, Fall 2002, pp. 265-297
- “Secret Buddhas (Hibutsu): The Limits of Buddhist Representation,” Monumenta Nipponica 57/3, Autumn 2002, pp. 271–307
- Rambelli, Fabio (2000). "21. Tantric Buddhism and Chinese Thought in East Asia". Tantra in Practice. pp. 361–380. doi:10.1515/9780691190457-027. ISBN 9780691190457.
- Rambelli, Fabio (1996). "Religion, ideology of domination, and nationalism: Kuroda Toshio on the discourse of shinkoku". Japanese Journal of Religious Studies. 23 (3–4). doi:10.18874/jjrs.23.3-4.1996.387-426.
- Rambelli, Fabio (1994). "True words, silence, and the adamantine dance: On Japanese Mikkyō and the formation of the Shingon discourse". Japanese Journal of Religious Studies. 21 (4). doi:10.18874/jjrs.21.4.1994.373-405.
