= Edoardo Chiossone =

Italian engraver

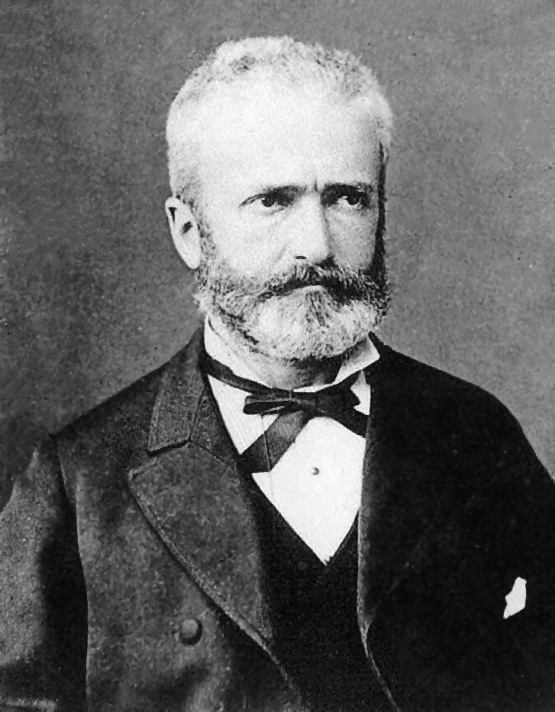
- Chiossone c. 1890s
- Born: January 21, 1833; Arenzano, Province of Genoa
- Died: April 11, 1898 (aged 65); Tokyo, Japan
- Occupations: artist, engraver

Edoardo Chiossone (January 21, 1833 – April 11, 1898) was an Italian engraver and painter, noted for his work as a foreign advisor to Meiji period Japan, and for his collection of Japanese art. He designed the first Japanese bank notes.

== Biography ==
Chiossone was born in Arenzano, Province of Genoa, as the son of a printer. In 1847 he enrolled in the Accademia Ligustica, where he specialized in copper-plate engraving, and graduated in 1855. In 1857 he entered the atelier of Raffaele Granara and made several engravings of famous art works. One of his works was selected for display at the Exposition Universelle (1867) in Paris.

Later in 1867, he started working for the Italian National Bank and was sent to the Dondorf-Naumann company in Frankfurt, Germany to be trained in the making of paper money. While he was there, the company began making bank notes for the Imperial Japanese government; in 1874 he was sent to London to learn new printing techniques. At this point, he was invited to go to Japan, and accepted.

Many of the portraits by Chiossone have been lost, and others only survive in reproduction; they can all be said to have been faithful likenesses. His well-known portrait of the Emperor Meiji is so realistic that it has often been mistaken to be an actual photograph.

=== Chiossone in Japan ===
Chiossone arrived in Japan on January 12, 1875. The government Printing Bureau (Insatsu Kyoku) which was part of the Ministry of Finance (Okurasho) was under the directorship of Tokuno Ryosuke, who was eager to introduce modern machinery and techniques. The practical implementation of this policy was entirely the work of Chiossone, who founded printing companies such as Toppan Insatsu, trained the Japanese in printing techniques, designed official papers, paper currencies and postage stamps, taught the art of making printing ink and printing paper (with a watermark in it), and taught how to make many copies from one plate.

After five months, Chiossone was offered a three-year contract with a monthly salary of 450 yen and a house; this was one of the highest salaries paid to a foreigner, and twice that of fellow Italian Antonio Fontanesi who was hired to teach oil painting. Chiossone's house was outside the foreign enclave in Tsukiji (he lived first in Kanda and then in Kōjimachi, with a retinue of servants). At the end of 1875, he made his first portrait, an engraving of the German physician Philipp Franz von Siebold. He also designed the "koban" postage stamp series which was issued in 1876/92. As there was a taboo against using the emperor's portrait, he had to resort to other images, such as the imperial chrysanthemum.

Other portraits followed in 1876, those of Ōkubo Toshimichi, Saigō Tsugumichi (younger brother of Saigō Takamori, who was Minister of the Navy and Home Minister), and William Chapman Ralston of the Bank of California. The next year the Emperor Meiji, attended by a hundred persons including Prince Arisugawa and Iwakura Tomomi visited the Printing Bureau and Chiossone's working room (destroyed in the 1923 Great Kantō earthquake). That year Chiossone also designed the first modern Japanese bank note, a one-yen note with the figure of Daikoku, the god of wealth. The next year he produced the first bank note containing a human figure, the image of the legendary Empress Jingū.

In 1879, Chiossone went on a trip around Japan with Tokuno Ryosuke to record ancient art works and monuments; 510 photographs were taken and Chiossone made 200 drawings. Tokuno recorded in his diary, published ten years later, that the two of them had had long conversations. The fruits of this trip were illustrated albums produced between 1880 and 1883.

In 1883, Chiossone was asked to make a portrait of Saigō Takamori, who had already been dead for six years; for this purpose he combined the features of Saigō's younger brother and a cousin of his, and this became the standard portrait and the model for famed bronze statue in Ueno Park. Chiossone also made a portrait of Tokuno two months before he died in that year, and designed his tombstone.

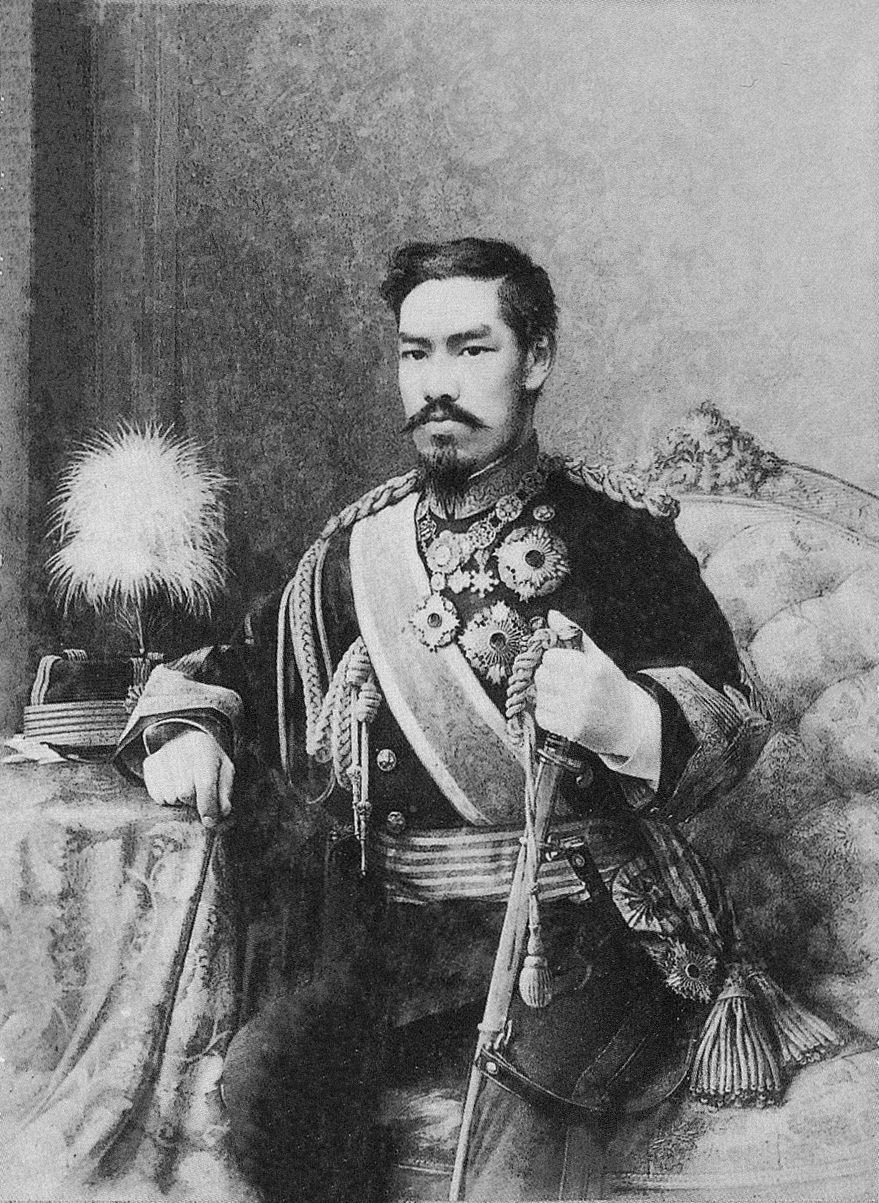
Chiossone's portrait of Emperor Meiji, 1888

In 1888, he received his highest recognition, when he was asked to produce a portrait of the Emperor, to be used as the official state portrait. The only existing portrait at that time was a photograph taken ten years before, and the Emperor refused to be photographed again. So the grand chamberlain Tokudaiji Sanemori arranged for Chiossone to sketch the Emperor at the palace from behind a screen. From his sketches, Chiossone produced two conté drawings of the Emperor, one in military uniform and the other in civilian clothes. These were then photographed and became the official images of the Emperor, and served as the basis of all the familiar representations.

Besides being engaged in painting portraits, which included further portraits of the Empress, the future Emperor Taishō, General Ōyama Iwao, Iwakura Tomomi and Sanjō Sanetomi, Chiossone was constantly kept busy at the Printing Bureau, producing plates for notes, stamps and bonds; in 1888 he produced a 5‑yen bank note with the figure of Sugawara Michizane on it, and, as his last work before retiring, a 100‑yen note with Fujiwara Kamatari (614‑669) on it. In 1891, he retired with 3,000 yen severance pay and an annual pension of 1,200 yen. He also received the Order of the Sacred Treasure, 3rd class.

== Death ==
On April 11, 1898, Chiossone died of heart failure at his home in Kōjimachi, and was buried in Aoyama Cemetery, where his tomb can still be seen in the foreign section. The papers brought out long articles on his death, and the Japan Weekly Mail spoke of his high reputation both for his artistic ability and for his friendly nature.

== Legacy ==
Chiossone was an avid collector of Japanese art, with a wide range including nihonga, ukiyo-e, Buddhist sculptures and liturgical objects, archaeological objects, lacquerware, porcelain, Noh masks, armor and weapons, musical instruments, and clothing for men and women. Per a provision in his will, this collection was sent to the Ligurian Academy of Fine Arts in Genoa after his death, where it was later formed into the Museum of Japanese Art "Edoardo Chiossone", opened to the public by King Victor Emmanuel III of Italy on October 30, 1905.

== See also ==
- Foreign cemeteries in Japan
- Edoardo Chiossone Museum of Oriental Art in Genoa
- Oyatoi gaikokujin
- Antonio Fontanesi
- Vincenzo Ragusa
