= Japanese Proof Set =

Set of Japanese proof coins

The Japanese Proof Set (プルーフセット), commonly known as the Proof Set in the United States, is a set of proof coins sold by the Japan Mint. These sets were first issued in 1987 (Shōwa 62) as "regular proof sets" consisting of denominations of 1, 5, 10, 50, 100, and 500 yen (666 yen total). In addition to "regular", those made since 1997 have also been referred to as "special", as these sets include a decorative case and in some instances a non-legal tender medal. Proof coinage is not intended for circulation as these are targeted towards collectors.

== Regular proof sets ==
=== Shōwa ===
Year of reign	Japanese date	Gregorian date	Sets issued	Case color
62nd	六十二	1987	230,000 (Note: 40,000 sets were sold in FY86, and 190,000 sets were sold in FY87.)	Black
63rd	六十三	1988	200,000	Black

=== Heisei ===
Year of reign	Japanese date	Gregorian date	Sets issued with year plate	Sets issued w/o year plate	Case color
1st	元	1989	200,000	N/A	Black
2nd	二	1990	200,000	N/A	Black
3rd	三	1991	200,000	N/A	Black
4th	四	1992	250,000	N/A	Black
5th	五	1993	250,000	N/A	Dark blue
6th	六	1994	227,000	N/A	Dark blue
7th	七	1995	200,000	N/A	Dark blue
8th	八	1996	189,000	N/A	Dark blue
9th	九	1997	187,000	N/A	Dark blue
10th	十	1998	170,000	N/A	Dark blue
11th	十一	1999	150,000	N/A	Dark blue
12th	十二	2000	126,000	N/A	Dark blue
13th	十三	2001	138,000	N/A	Dark blue
14th	十四	2002	141,000 (Note: 3,000 additional sets were sold at the Tokyo International Anime Fair with different paper cases and year plates to commemorate the 15th anniversary of production.)	N/A	Blue
15th	十五	2003	98,400	6,600	Dark blue
16th	十六	2004	94,900	13,100	Dark blue
17th	十七	2005	76,700	10,000	Dark blue
18th	十八	2006	63,400	8,700	Dark blue
19th	十九	2007	53,200	7,000	Dark blue
20th	二十	2008	55,200	6,000	Dark blue
21st	二十一	2009	48,400	5,600	Dark blue
22nd	二十二	2010	41,687	5,500	Dark blue
23rd	二十三	2011	40,100	5,500	Dark blue
24th	二十四	2012	38,220	5,000	Dark blue
25th	二十五	2013	37,500	5,000	Dark blue
26th	二十六	2014	33,700	4,790	Dark blue
27th	二十七	2015	28,700	5,100	Dark blue
28th	二十八	2016	32,184	4,816	Dark blue
29th	二十九	2017	24,580	4,420	Dark blue
30th	三十	2018	30,000	5,000	Dark blue
31st	三十一	2019	50,000	10,000	Dark blue

=== Reiwa ===
All of the case sets issued during the Reiwa era have been in dark blue. As the 500 yen coin was redesigned in 2021, two varieties of proof sets exist for that given year.

Year of reign	Japanese date	Gregorian date	Sets issued with year plate	Sets issued w/o year plate
1st	元	2019	30,000	5,000
2nd	二	2020	37,400	9,500
3rd (old 500 yen)	三	2021	36,000	7,000
3rd (new 500 yen)	三	2021	36,000	9,000
4th	四	2022	30,000	9,000
5th	五	2023	27,800	7,050
6th	六	2024	26,200	6,600
7th	七	2025	TBA	TBA

== Special proof sets ==
Sets colored in yellow include all 6 denominations of yen with a medal.

=== Heisei (SPS) ===
Year of reign	Japanese date	Gregorian date	Sets issued	Case color	Theme
9th	九	1997	25,000	Blue	Tokyo Bay Aqua-Line opening
10th	十	1998	30,000	Blue	Akashi Kaikyo Bridge opening
11th	十一	1999	70,000	Black	Honoring the 1870 (Meiji year 3) 20 yen gold coin
11th	十一	1999	50,000	Blue	Shin–Onomichi, Tatara and Kurushima Kaikyō Bridge opening
12th	十二	2000	100,000	Black	Honoring the 1874 (Meiji 7) 1 yen silver coin
13th	十三	2001	100,000	Black	Honoring the 1875 (Meiji 8) trade dollar
14th	十四	2002	95,000	Blue (Note: These cases are also called "transparent".)	First issue of the "TECHNO" series
15th	十五	2003	90,000	Pink	50th anniversary of Astro Boy
15th	十五	2003	70,000	Red	75th anniversary of Steamboat Willie
15th	十五	2003	5,000	Red	400th anniversary of the Edo period
15th	十五	2003	5,000	Blue	Japan Mint Collection in Omotesandō
16th	十六	2004	50,000	Pink	30th anniversary of Hello Kitty
16th	十六	2004	60,000	Blue	70th anniversary of the Greater Japan Tokyo Baseball Club
16th	十六	2004	60,000	Red	Second issue of the "TECHNO" series
16th	十六	2004	5,000	Green	40th anniversary of the 1964 Tokyo Olympics
17th	十七	2005	60,000	Light blue	35th anniversary of Doraemon
17th	十七	2005	34,000	Blue	50th anniversary of the modern aluminum 1 yen coin
17th	十七	2005	30,000	Blue	50th anniversary of the Pencil Rocket
17th	十七	2005	47,300	Green	Third issue of the "TECHNO" series
18th	十八	2006	35,000	Pink	Cherry blossoms
18th	十八	2006	49,900	Blue	50th anniversary of Yūjirō Ishihara (first film debut)
18th	十八	2006	46,000	Red	Australia-Japan Year of Exchange (Note: These sets include a commemorative coin from the country mentioned.)
18th	十八	2006	40,000	White	Honoring the 1932 (Shōwa year 7) "phantom" 20 yen gold coin
18th	十八	2006	4,000	Dark blue	Mint Tokyo Fair: 2006 - The Dawn of Modern Japan: The Birth of the Yen
19th	十九	2007	35,000	Pink	Cherry blossoms
19th	十九	2007	40,100	Black	140th death anniversary of Sakamoto Ryōma
19th	十九	2007	33,500	Blue	2007 World Championships in Athletics
19th	十九	2007	3,000	Dark blue	Mint Tokyo Fair: 2007 - 50th anniversary of the 100 yen coin
19th	十九	2007	30,000	Blue	Japan-New Zealand Friendship
20th	二十	2008	27,000	Pink	Cherry blossoms
20th	二十	2008	44,000	Blue	150th anniversary of French-Japanese relations
20th	二十	2008	33,000	Black	1,300th anniversary of the Wadokaichin
20th	二十	2008	3,000	Dark blue	Mint Tokyo Fair: 2008 - Japanese Scenery
21st	二十一	2009	25,000	Pink	Cherry blossoms
21st	二十一	2009	25,000	Blue	80th Anniversary of Canada-Japan diplomatic relations
21st	二十一	2009	25,000	Blue	400th Anniversary of Japan-Netherlands Trade
21st	二十一	2009	3,000	Dark blue	Mint Tokyo Fair: 2009
22nd	二十二	2010	20,000	Pink	Cherry blossoms
22nd	二十二	2010	20,000	Blue	Japan in Turkey (coins produced by the Turkish Mint)
22nd	二十二	2010	2,813	Dark blue	Mint Tokyo Fair: 2010
22nd	二十二	2010	20,000	Blue	"A Dog of Flanders" Japan-Belgium
22nd	二十二	2010	20,000	Black	Fourth issue of the "TECHNO" series
23rd	二十三	2011	19,400	Pink	Cherry blossoms
23rd	二十三	2011	20,000	Black	Fifth issue of the "TECHNO" series
23rd	二十三	2011	20,000	Blue	"WWF 50th Anniversary" Japan-United Kingdom
23rd	二十三	2011	3,000	Black	Mint Tokyo Fair: 2011
24th	二十四	2012	20,000	Pink	Cherry blossoms
24th	二十四	2012	22,000	Purple	30th anniversary of the cupronickel 500 yen coin
24th	二十四	2012	15,000	Blue	60th Anniversary of Japan-Sri Lanka diplomatic relations
24th	二十四	2012	2,780	Black	Mint Tokyo Fair: 2012
25th	二十五	2013	20,000	Pink	Cherry blossoms
25th	二十五	2013	18,000	Blue	400th Anniversary of Japan-Spain relations
25th	二十五	2013	19,185	Ocher	In memory of Sen and Rin subsidiary coins
25th	二十五	2013	2,315	Dark blue	Mint Tokyo Fair: 2013
26th	二十六	2014	16,300	Pink	Cherry blossoms
26th	二十六	2014	20,000	Red	50th anniversary of the 1964 Tokyo Olympics
26th	二十六	2014	20,000	Purple	100th anniversary of Takarazuka Revue
26th	二十六	2014	2,210	Dark blue	Mint Tokyo Fair: 2014
27th	二十七	2015	16,200	Pink	Cherry blossoms
27th	二十七	2015	20,000	Yellow	60th anniversary of the modern aluminum 1 yen coin
27th	二十七	2015	19,613	Green	50th anniversary of Kimba the White Lion (TV series)
27th	二十七	2015	2.387	Maroon	Mint Tokyo Fair: 2015
28th	二十八	2016	18,000	Pink	Cherry blossoms
28th	二十八	2016	20,000	Red	50th anniversary of Ultraman
28th	二十八	2016	15,000	Maroon	300th anniversary of the Kyōhō Reforms
28th	二十八	2016	15,000	Dark blue	Japan Mint's Saitama assay office
29th	二十九	2017	20,200	Pink	50th anniversary of Licca-chan
29th	二十九	2017	13,800	Light blue	150th anniversary of the Opening of the Ports of Kobe and Osaka
29th	二十九	2017	14,000	Blue	50th anniversary of the modern cupronickel 50 & 100 yen coin
29th	二十九	2017	15,000	Purple	150th Anniversary of the Restoration of Imperial Rule
29th	二十九	2017	16,000	Pink	Cherry blossoms
30th	三十	2018	15,000	Pink	Cherry blossoms
30th	三十	2018	25,000	Black	50th anniversary of GeGeGe no Kitarō (anime series)
30th	三十	2018	12,000	Teal	150th Anniversary of the naming of Hokkaido
30th	三十	2018	12,000	Red	60th Anniversary of Tokyo Tower
31st	三十一	2019	15,000	Pink	Cherry blossoms

=== Reiwa (SPS) ===
Year of reign	Japanese date	Gregorian date	Sets issued	Case color	Theme
1st	元	2019	15,000	Leather	50th anniversary of Otoko wa Tsurai yo.
2nd	二	2020	18,100	Pink	Cherry blossoms.
2nd	二	2020	20,000	Purple	Neon Genesis Evangelion.
2nd	二	2020	20,000	Dark Green	100th anniversary of the protection of National treasures.
3rd	三	2021	17,000	Pink	Cherry blossoms.
3rd	三	2021	20,000	Black	50th anniversary of Kamen Rider.
3rd	三	2021	17,000	light orange	100th anniversary of the protection of National treasures.
4th	四	2022	16,000	Pink	Cherry blossoms.
4th	四	2022	35,000	Sky blue	25th anniversary of One Piece
4th	四	2022	14,200	Light blue-green	100th anniversary of the protection of National treasures.
4th	四	2022	18,800	Blue	150th Anniversary of Japanese Customs.
5th	五	2023	12,650	Pink	Cherry blossoms
5th	五	2023	16,000	Light blue	30th Anniversary of Nintama Rantarō.
5th	五	2023	15,000	Light yellow	60th Anniversary of the Kurobe Dam.
5th	五	2023	8,500	Red	25th Anniversary of Ojarumaru (broadcast).
6th	六	2024	12,200	Pink	Cherry blossoms
6th	六	2024	10,000	Red	50th Anniversary of the Akasaka Palace State Guest House
6th	六	2024	29,000	Black	70th Anniversary of Godzilla
7th	七	2025	TBA	TBA	—N/a

== See also ==
- 500 yen coin (commemorative)
