= Japanese Mint Set =

Set of uncirculated Japanese coins

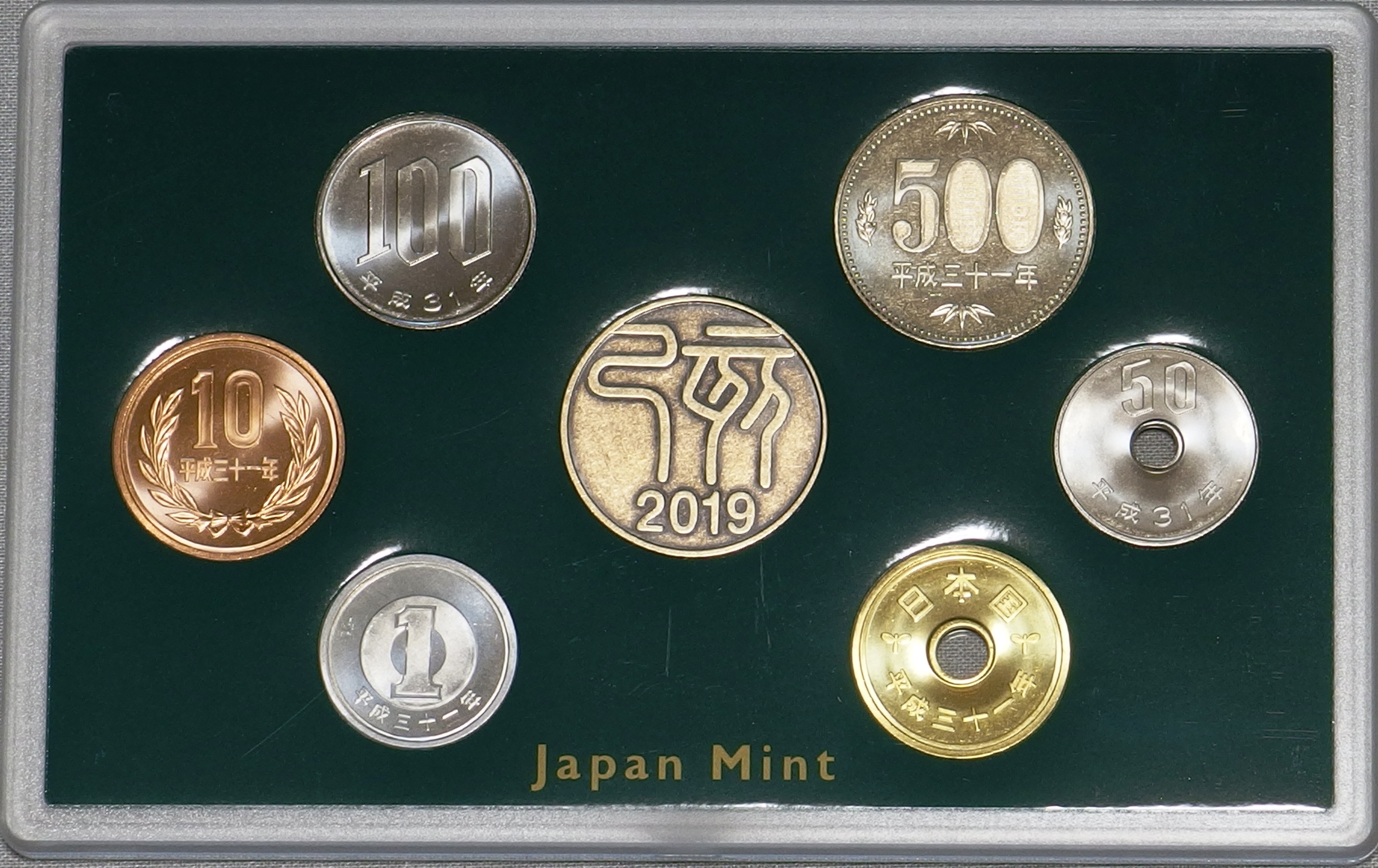
Japanese mint set from 2019

The Japanese Mint Set (ミントセット) formally called Standard Coin Set (通常貨幣セット), is a set of uncirculated coins sold by the Japan Mint. These sets were first issued in 1969 (Shōwa 44) as "standard coin sets" consisting of denominations of 1, 5, 10, 50, and 100 (166 yen total). Some of these early sets included commemorative 100 yen coins before the 500 yen coin was introduced in 1982 (666 yen total). The original name "standard coin set" gradually transitioned to "mint set", as by 1990 the latter name was in common use. Starting in 1998, this new name was made official by the Japan Mint. Each mint set (Note: Since 1975) comes with a "year plate" which is placed in a plastic case and then placed in an outer paper case alongside the coins. As with other specially made mint sets, these coins are targeted towards collectors rather than for circulation.

== Shōwa ==
Year of reign	Japanese date	Gregorian date	Year plate	Sets issued	Case color
44th	四十四	1969	—N/a	6,162	White
45th	四十五	1970	—N/a	26,000 (Note: This set includes a commemorative 100 yen coin)	White
46th	四十六	1971	—N/a	14,653	White
47th	四十七	1972	—N/a	30,000	White
50th	五十	1975	Year only	720,000	White
51st	五十一	1976	Dragon	580,000	White
52nd	五十二	1977	Snake	520,000	Orange
53rd	五十三	1978	Horse	488,000	Navy blue
54th	五十四	1979	Goat	400,000	Red
55th	五十五	1980	Monkey	520,000	Green
56th	五十六	1981	Rooster	568,000	Brown
57th	五十七	1982	Dog	632,000	White
58th	五十八	1983	Pig	502,000	Green
59th	五十九	1984	Rat	520,000	Red
60th	六十	1985	Ox	820,000 (Note: This set includes a commemorative 500 yen coin)	Blue
60th	六十	1985	Paulownia	746,000	Blue
61st	六十一	1986	Tiger	597,000	Red
61st	六十一	1986	Paulownia	642,000	Purple
62nd	六十二	1987	Rabbit	545,000	Red
63rd	六十三	1988	Dragon	647,000	Red

== Heisei ==
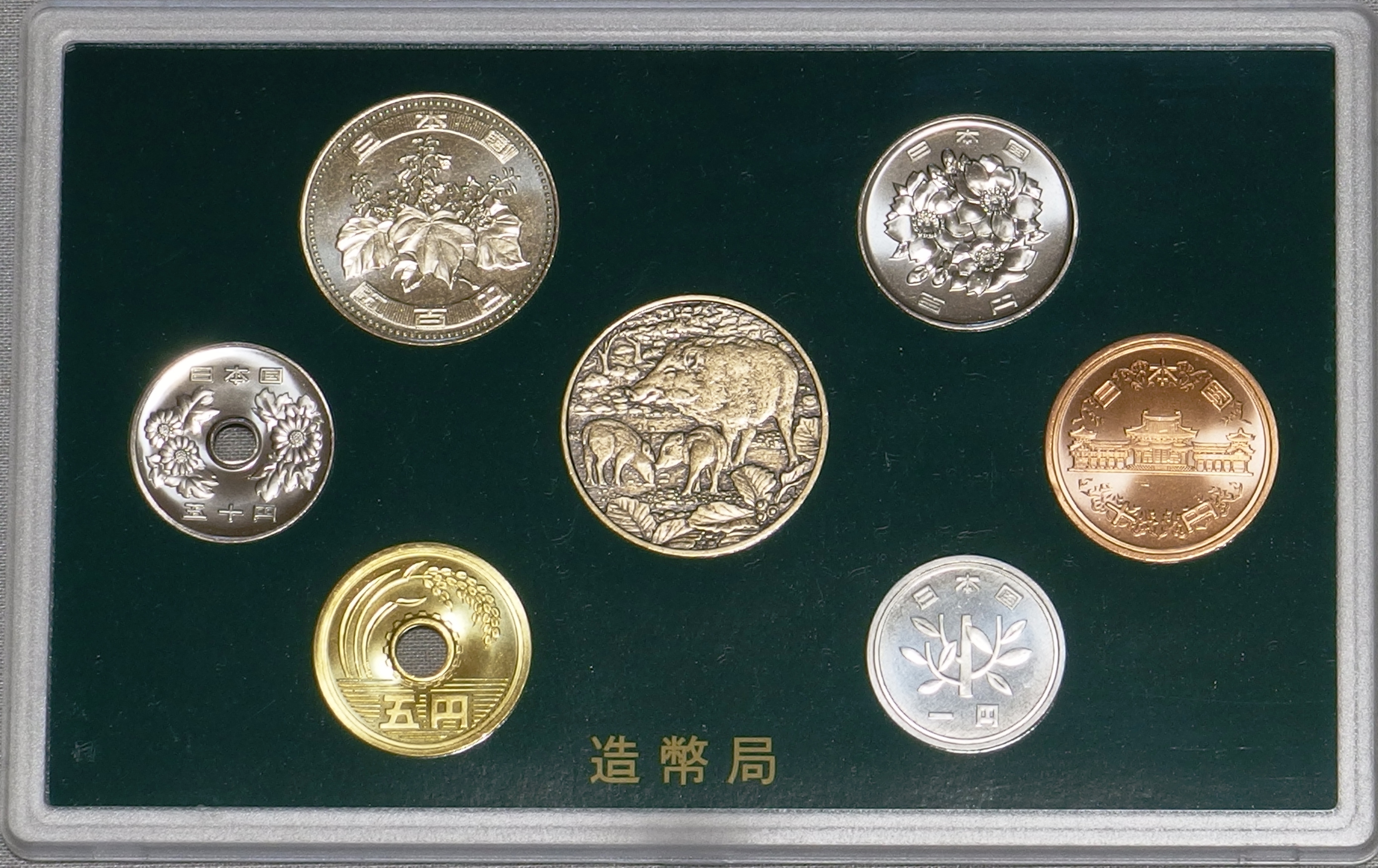
Japanese mint set from 2019 (year of the pig)

Year of reign	Japanese date	Gregorian date	Year plate	Sets issued	Case color
1st	元	1989	Snake	647,000	Red
2nd	二	1990	Horse	600,000	Red
3rd	三	1991	Goat	600,000	Red
4th	四	1992	Paulownia (Note: The year plate also includes a Monkey)	700,000	Blue
5th	五	1993	Paulownia (Note: The year plate also includes a Rooster)	800,000	Purple
6th	六	1994	Dog	570,000	Red
7th	七	1995	Pig	355,000	Red
8th	八	1996	Rat	321,000	Red
9th	九	1997	Ox	331,000	Red
10th	十	1998	Tiger	336,000	Red
11th	十一	1999	Rabbit	290,000	Red
12th	十二	2000	Dragon	340,200	Red
13th	十三	2001	Snake	224,000	Red
14th	十四	2002	Horse	214,800	Red
15th	十五	2003	Goat	200,500	Red
16th	十六	2004	Monkey	189,000	Red
17th	十七	2005	Paulownia	200,000	Dark blue
17th	十七	2005	Rooster	141,000	Red
18th	十八	2006	Dog	189,400	Red
19th	十九	2007	—N/a	180,000	Photograph
19th	十九	2007	Pig	142,680	Red
20th	二十	2008	Rat	154,022	Illustration
20th	二十	2008	—N/a	142,000	Illustration
21st	二十一	2009	Ox	152,637	Illustration
22nd	二十二	2010	Tiger	152,500	Illustration
23rd	二十三	2011	Rabbit	168,291	Dark blue
24th	二十四	2012	Dragon	158,500	Tan
25th	二十五	2013	Snake	150,000	Lime
26th	二十六	2014	Horse	141,191	Orange
27th	二十七	2015	Goat	131,980	Light blue
28th	二十八	2016	Monkey	126,109	Pink
29th	二十九	2017	Rooster	123,324	Red
30th	三十	2018	Dog	132,108	Light purple
31st	三十一	2019	Pig	360,027	Green

== Reiwa ==
Year of reign	Japanese date	Gregorian date	Year plate	Sets issued	Case color
1st	元	2019	Pig	350,013	Pink
2nd	二	2020	Rat	166,760	White
3rd	三	2021	Ox	170,400 (Note: Old 500 yen coin)	White
3rd	三	2021	Ox	128,000 (Note: New 500 yen coin)	White
4th	四	2022	Tiger	148,564	White
5th	五	2023	Rabbit	137,330	White
6th	六	2024	Dragon	130,700	White
7th	七	2025	Snake	TBA	TBA
8th	八	2026	Horse	TBA	TBA
