= 50 yen coin =

Denomination of Japanese yen

Fifty yen
- Japan
- Value: 50 Japanese yen
- Mass: 4 g
- Diameter: 21 mm
- Shape: circular
- Center hole diameter: 4 mm
- Composition: Cupronickel
- Years of minting: 1967–present

Obverse
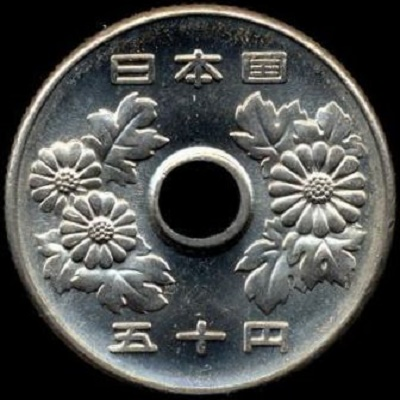
- Design: Chrysanthemum
- Design date: 1967

Reverse
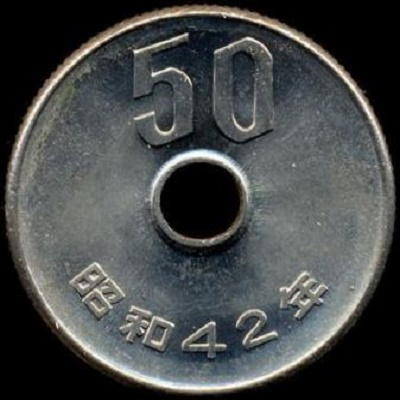
- Design: "50" in Arabic numerals
- Design date: 1967

The 50 yen coin (五十円硬貨, Gojū-en kōka) is a denomination of Japanese yen. These coins were first minted in 1955, and concurrently circulated alongside a banknote denomination of the same amount. 50 yen notes were eventually pulled from circulation shortly before the center of the 50 yen coin was holed. The first yen coins were made of pure nickel and slightly larger than the ones used today. Changes to the 50 yen coin were made in response to events surrounding the 100 yen coin. The public wanted a different looking 50 yen coin while the mint wanted to stay consistent with the material used to make the coins. The current design was first minted in 1967 using Cupronickel rather than pure nickel. The 50 yen coin continues to be minted for commerce, and is a collectible among hobbyists.

== History ==
The first 50 yen coins were released in 1955 featuring a chrysanthemum flower viewed from the side on the reverse, and a stylized ancient weight on the obverse. These unholed coins had a diameter of 25 mm, and were made of pure nickel. For a brief time the final "B series" of the 50 yen note circulated concurrently with the newly issued coins until the notes were pulled from circulation in 1958. Three different designs were used for the 50 yen coin which included adding a hole in the center, and reducing the coin's size. The decision to hole the center of the coin came with a new design in 1959 due to public protest. Problems with the first 50 yen coin centered around its similarity to the 100 yen coin as both coins had similar designs at the time, and neither had perforated edges. This new holed design dropped the stylized weight on the obverse, and shows a chrysanthemum flower viewed from above on the reverse. Coin production then declined in 1960 with only 6,000,000 struck, making it the lowest circulating date during Shōwa's reign.

This second design lasted until 1967, when the metallurgy was changed to cupronickel in response to the replacement of silver on the 100 yen coin that same year. During this time the overall diameter, and weight of the coin was reduced including the central hole. (Note: 50 yen coin changes in 1967 include a reduction in diameter from 25 to 21 mm, and a weight change from 5 grams to 4. The size of the center hole was also reduced from 6 mm in diameter to 4.) The obverse was redesigned to feature 3 small flowers rather than an overhead view of a chrysanthemum flower. Coins continued to be minted for circulation throughout Shōwa's reign with the exception of 1987, when they were confined to mint sets only. According to the Japanese mint, no 50 yen coins were made during Shōwa's last year of reign as the dies needed to make coins for Akihito had already been produced. The mint also stated that they do not produce all 6 coin denominations at once as the need depends on a manufacturing plan. Denominations of 1, 5, 10, and 500 yen had been given priority over 50 and 100 yen coins.

Production of the 50 yen coin started out strong during the first years of the Heisei era with mintage figures in the hundreds of millions. These numbers fell off sharply in the late 2000s in response to the rising use of electronic money. By 2010 to 2013, (year 22 to 25) the 50 yen coin was confined to mint sets rather than for circulation. Mintage figures recovered afterwards except for Akihito's last year of reign that saw a mintage of only 1,118,000 coins. Regular production of 50 yen coins continued until 2022, when they were again confined to mint sets only rather than circulation. The 50 yen coin continues to be produced as the 3rd highest currently circulating coin denomination of yen. These coins also share being one of only two holed denominations along with the 5 yen coin.

== Designs ==
| Image | Minted | Diameter | Weight | Composition | Hole |
|---|---|---|---|---|---|
| | 1955–1958 | 25 mm | 5g | 100% nickel | None |
| | 1959–1966 | 25 mm | 5g | 100% nickel | 6 mm |
| | 1967– | 21 mm | 4g | 75% copper, 25% nickel | 4 mm |

== Circulation figures ==
=== Shōwa ===
The following are circulation dates which cover Emperor Hirohito's reign. The dates below correspond with the 30th to the 64th year (last) of his reign. When these coins were first made they were larger than the present form and used Kanji script to represent the date. The current smaller fifty yen coin dates to 1967 (year 42) when Arabic numerals were used to reflect the emperor's year of reign (date). Coins for this period will all begin with the Japanese symbol 昭和 (Shōwa).

- Japanese coins are read with a left to right format:

"Emperors name" → "Number representing year of reign" → "Year" (Ex: 昭和 → 50 → 年).

| Year of reign | Japanese date | Gregorian date | Mintage (Note: Mintages on the Japan Mint website are in thousands) |
|---|---|---|---|
| 30th | 三十 | 1955 | 63,700,000 |
| 31st | 三十一 | 1956 | 91,300,000 |
| 32nd | 三十二 | 1957 | 39,000,000 |
| 33rd | 三十三 | 1958 | 18,000,000 |
| 34th | 三十四 | 1959 | 23,900,000 |
| 35th | 三十五 | 1960 | 6,000,000 |
| 36th | 三十六 | 1961 | 16,000,000 |
| 37th | 三十七 | 1962 | 50,300,000 |
| 38th | 三十八 | 1963 | 55,000,000 |
| 39th | 三十九 | 1964 | 69,200,000 |
| 40th | 四十 | 1965 | 189,300,000 |
| 41st | 四十一 | 1966 | 171,500,000 |
| 42nd | N/A | 1967 | 238,400,000 |
| 43rd | N/A | 1968 | 200,000,000 |
| 44th | N/A | 1969 | 210,900,000 |
| 45th | N/A | 1970 | 269,800,000 |
| 46th | N/A | 1971 | 80,950,000 |
| 47th | N/A | 1972 | 138,980,000 |
| 48th | N/A | 1973 | 200,970,000 |
| 49th | N/A | 1974 | 470,000,000 |
| 50th | N/A | 1975 | 238,120,000 |
| 51st | N/A | 1976 | 241,880,000 |
| 52nd | N/A | 1977 | 176,000,000 |
| 53rd | N/A | 1978 | 234,000,000 |
| 54th | N/A | 1979 | 110,000,000 |
| 55th | N/A | 1980 | 51,000,000 |
| 56th | N/A | 1981 | 179,000,000 |
| 57th | N/A | 1982 | 30,000,000 |
| 58th | N/A | 1983 | 30,000,000 |
| 59th | N/A | 1984 | 29,850,000 |
| 60th | N/A | 1985 | 10,150,000 |
| 61st | N/A | 1986 | 9,960,000 |
| 62nd | N/A | 1987 | 775,000 (Note: These coins were sold exclusively in mint and proof sets.) |
| 63rd | N/A | 1988 | 109,112,000 |

=== Heisei ===
The following are circulation dates during the reign of Emperor Akihito. who was crowned in 1989. The dates below correspond with the 1st to the 31st year (last) of his reign. First year of reign coins are marked with a 元 symbol (first) as a one year type. Aside from his first year of reign, every fifty yen coin minted during the Heisei period uses Arabic numerals for a date. These coins begin with the Japanese symbol 平成 (Heisei).

- Japanese coins are read with a left to right format:

"Emperors name" → "Number representing year of reign" → "Year" (Ex: 平成 → 13 → 年).

| Year of reign | Gregorian date | Mintage |
|---|---|---|
| 1st (元) | 1989 | 245,000,000 |
| 2nd | 1990 | 274,953,000 |
| 3rd | 1991 | 209,120,000 |
| 4th | 1992 | 49,130,000 |
| 5th | 1993 | 51,240,000 |
| 6th | 1994 | 65,767,000 |
| 7th | 1995 | 111,874,000 |
| 8th | 1996 | 82,213,000 |
| 9th | 1997 | 150,086,000 |
| 10th | 1998 | 100,612,000 |
| 11th | 1999 | 59,120,000 |
| 12th | 2000 | 7,026,000 |
| 13th | 2001 | 8,024,000 |
| 14th | 2002 | 11,667,000 |
| 15th | 2003 | 10,406,000 |
| 16th | 2004 | 9,903,000 |
| 17th | 2005 | 10,029,000 |
| 18th | 2006 | 10,594,000 |
| 19th | 2007 | 9,904,000 |
| 20th | 2008 | 8,811,000 |
| 21st | 2009 | 5,003,000 |
| 22nd | 2010 | 510,000 |
| 23rd | 2011 | 456,000 |
| 24th | 2012 | 659,000 |
| 25th | 2013 | 554,000 |
| 26th | 2014 | 7,538,000 |
| 27th | 2015 | 47,004,000 |
| 28th | 2016 | 46,064,000 |
| 29th | 2017 | 20,927,000 |
| 30th | 2018 | 56,960,000 |
| 31st | 2019 | 1,118,000 |

=== Reiwa ===
The following are circulation dates in the reign of the current Emperor. Naruhito's accession to the Chrysanthemum Throne took place on May 1, 2019 and he was formally enthroned on October 22, 2019. Coins for this period all begin with the Japanese symbol 令和 (Reiwa). The inaugural year coin (2019) was marked 元 (first) and debuted during the summer of that year.

- Japanese coins are read with a left to right format:

"Emperors name" → "Number representing year of reign" → "Year" (Ex: 令和 → 2 → 年).

| Year of reign | Gregorian date | Mintage |
|---|---|---|
| 1st (元) | 2019 | 42,502,000 |
| 2nd | 2020 | 58,428,000 |
| 3rd | 2021 | 9,133,000 |
| 4th | 2022 | 574,000 |
| 5th | 2023 | 463,000 |
| 6th | 2024 | 511,000 |
| 7th | 2025 | 595,000 |
| 8th | 2026 | TBD |

== Collecting ==
All nickel based 50 yen coins minted prior to 1967 are now rarely seen in circulation. Collectors over time eventually took notice of key dates such as 1960 (year 35) as only 6 million of these coins were struck. It was reported by 1972 that a coin collecting boom had caused coin shortages in the country. During this time, coins minted in 1960 were listed for as much as 5,000 yen ($19 USD (Note: Adjusted for inflation the amount exceeded $100 (USD).)) a coin. The old nickel based coins may have also been taken out of circulation in response to the rising price of nickel bullion. Low mintage coins returned again towards the end of end of Emperor Shōwa's reign, with 1987 (year 62) dated coins confined to special proof sets. Coins dated 2010 to 2013 (year 22 to 25) under Emperor Akihito were also minted in very small numbers as they were confined to sets as well rather than for circulation. Some of these more recent coins have found their way into circulation and sell for many times their face value regardless of their condition. During the last year of Akihito's reign only 1,118,000 coins were struck for the 50 yen piece. It was reported that collectors and the public alike kept year 31 (2019) coins of all denominations as "Heisei Memorials". Error coins such as examples missing the center hole are also popular with collectors and trade at high prices.
