= 1 yen coin =

Smallest denomination of the Japanese yen currency

One yen
- Japan
- Value: 1 Japanese yen
- Mass: 1 g
- Diameter: 20 mm
- Edge: Smooth
- Composition: 100% Al (current)
- Years of minting: 1871–present

Obverse
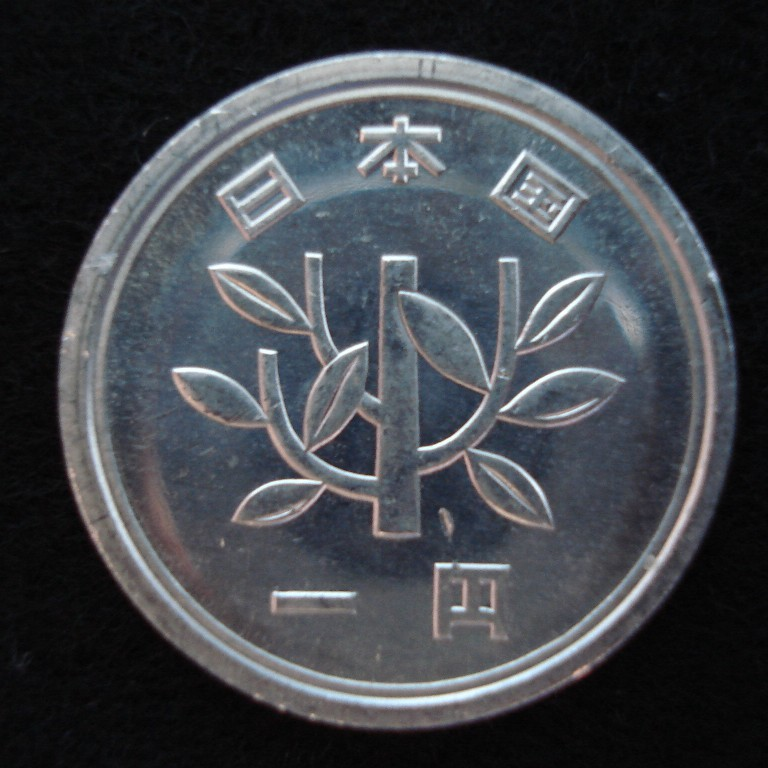
- Design: Young tree with the words "Japan" above and "1 Yen" below
- Design date: 1955

Reverse
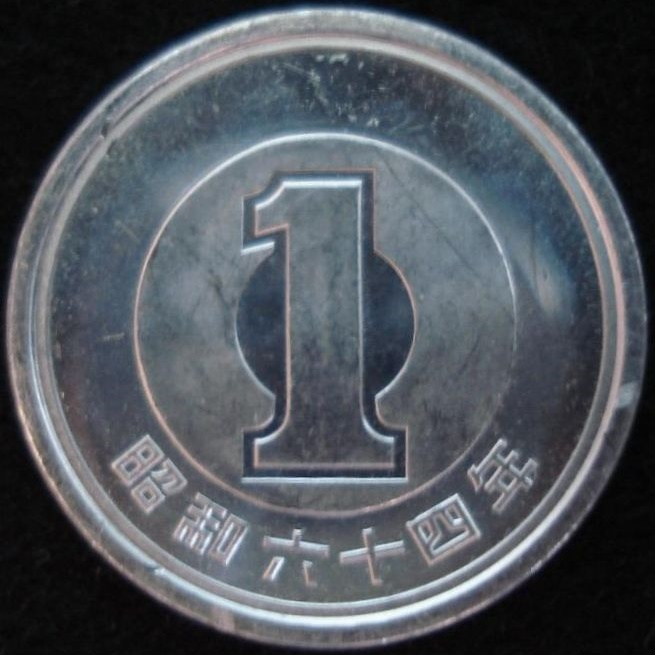
- Design: "1" in a circle with year of issue in kanji Showa era year 64 (1989)
- Design date: 1955

The 1-yen coin (Japanese: 一円硬貨, Hepburn: Ichi-en kōka) is the smallest denomination of the Japanese yen currency. Historically they were initially made of both silver and gold in the early 1870s. Issues facing the Japanese government at the time included wanting to adopt the gold standard, and competing against the Mexican dollar for use in foreign trade. The decision was made to use silver one yen coins exclusively outside of Japan for trade, while gold coins were minted and used in mainland Japan. Gold and silver coins were eventually allowed to co-circulate in mainland Japan from 1878 to 1897 when they were demonetized. Millions of former one yen silver coins were countermarked by the Japanese government for use outside of the mainland. Silver one yen coins continued to be minted until 1914 for backing up currency.

One yen coins were not made again until after World War II in the late 1940s for a brief period of time. The current one yen coin design was first minted in 1955, is made up of pure aluminum, and has a young tree design which has been used since. Between 2011 and 2013 and from 2016 to 2026, production of the coin was confined to mint sets due to lack of demand caused by increased usage of electronic money. Mass production was restarted in July 2026 to replenish the increasingly worn out coins in circulation and self-checkout machines.

== History ==
=== Early yen (1870–1914) ===
The first Japanese one-yen coins were minted between 1871 and 1872 using both silver and gold alloys. This came at a time when a new decimal system was put into place, and a modern mint was established at Osaka. The yen was officially adopted by the Meiji government in an act signed on June 27, 1871. While silver one yen coins are dated 1870, this indicates their mintage date at the San Francisco Mint as the coins were not issued until the following year. Gold one yen coins dated 1871 were not minted until 1872 at the newly formed Osaka mint. No silver one yen coins were struck in 1873 as the year was devoted to turning out gold pieces domestically. The exclusive minting of gold coins during this time was reflective of the Japanese government's wish to switch to the gold standard in order to keep up with countries in North America and Europe. The Japanese government eventually came to the conclusion that issuing silver one yen coins alongside standard gold coins was in the best interest of foreign trade. Silver one yen coinage was resumed in 1874 for use outside of Japan to compete with the silver Mexican dollar.

During the same year gold bullion rose to a slight premium which caused gold coin production as a whole to rapidly fall off. It was reported in the Quarterly Journal of Economics that by 1876 more gold coins were exported to foreign countries than for use domestically. Gold coinage finally came to an end in 1877 as the Japanese government was forced off the gold standard due to the cost of the Satsuma Rebellion. (Note: One yen gold coins were only struck in 1880 as part of presentation sets. These were given as gifts for visiting dignitaries and heads of state.) Japan ultimately chose to go with a bimetallic standard in 1878, which gave the one yen silver coin legal tender status throughout the country. From 1878 to 1897, large amounts of one yen coins were struck as the declining price of silver increased their demand. The fluctuations over the price of silver eventually made trade with Europe and the United States unreliable.

After years of advisement, the Japanese government officially switched back to the gold standard on October 1, 1897 as a solution to the trading problem. Silver one yen coins were thus officially demonetized with granted leeway time until July 31, 1898 for those wanting to trade the coins for gold. The remaining silver coins in circulation were then either melted down to provide bullion for subsidiary coins, or were countermarked "Gin" for use in Japanese-occupied Taiwan, Korea, and Lüshunkou. Silver one yen coins were not stuck again until 1901 when they served as a reserve fund for "Bank of Formosa" notes. Due to the fluctuations in price between silver and gold, this practice came to an end in 1904. The production of silver one yen coins eventually ended in 1914 during the 3rd year of Emperor Taishō's reign.

=== Modern yen (1948–) ===
Japanese coinage was reformed in 1948 with the issue of a brass one-yen coin. 451,170,000 coins were minted until production stopped in 1950. The obverse of these brass coins features a numeral "1" with "Japan" above, and the date below, while the reverse reads "One Yen" with a floral pattern below it. The current aluminum coin was first introduced in 1955 with a floral design. The obverse has a young tree, intended to symbolize the healthy growth of Japan. The reverse side of the coin has a figure "1" in a circle that represents one yen; below the digit is the year of issue which is written in kanji. The one yen coin remains the oldest modern denomination coin with an unchanged design; throughout its minting history during the Showa era the coin was fully halted only once in 1968 due to excessive production. In 1989 a national consumption tax (set at 3%) was put into place resulting in many prices that were not multiples of 5 or 10 yen, causing the Japan Mint to produce one yen coins in huge amounts.

This consumption tax rate was raised in 1997 to 5%, reducing demand for the coin. By the turn of the century other factors such as rising metal costs and increasing usage of electronic money began to come into play. It was reported in 2003 that it cost 13 yen for the mint to produce a rolled plate (Note: Metal is melted down into ingots that are then rolled into plates to the thickness of the desired coin, the blanks are then punched out of the plates.) for one yen coins. The rising price of aluminum had started to generate a commercial loss for the Japan Mint. In 2009, unsuccessful measures that included raising money from the private sector were tried in order to lower the cost. From 2011 to 2013 the Ministry of Finance stopped issuing new one yen coins for circulation. There was a small production run of 500,000 to 700,000 coins in mint sets for coin collectors. Production resumed in 2014 when the consumption tax was raised again to 8%, causing sums to be less rounded. The cost of producing each one yen coin was reported to be 3 yen as early as 2015. In the following year, more cashless transactions caused the ministry to stop issuing new one yen coins for circulation again. No coins were made from 2016 to 2026 apart from those in collectable mint sets. In July 2026, it was reported that the Mint had resumed mass production of 1-yen coins to replace those in current circulation that had worn out. These were the first circulating 1-yen coins to bear the name of the Reiwa era (Reiwa 8).

One-yen coins have also seen non monetary usage; since all 1-yen coins weigh just one gram, they are sometimes used as weights. If placed carefully on the surface of still water, 1-yen coins will not break surface tension and thus can also float.

== Elimination proposal & public opinion ==
On February 25, 2021 CDP leader Kenta Izumi proposed to abolish 1 and 5-yen coins due to the fee involved with depositing them at banks. Izumi's issue was that a fee of 550 yen is incurred at most major banks for deposits involving 101 coins or more. Taro Aso, who was at the time the Minister of Finance pushed back on the notion stating "we have no plans to abolish it immediately" as there is a demand for small value transactions. It was reported in October 2017 that one yen coins remained popular in places like Osaka, where the coins are traditionally used for these types of merchant transactions.

According to correspondent Leo Lewis of the Financial Times, the overall use of cash will not be "broken easily" in Japan. Lewis says that elderly Japanese people have not been eager for innovation, and conditions such as "low street crime, low interest rates and a reduced threshold on inheritance tax" remain in place that increase the appeal of carrying cash.

== Types and specifications ==
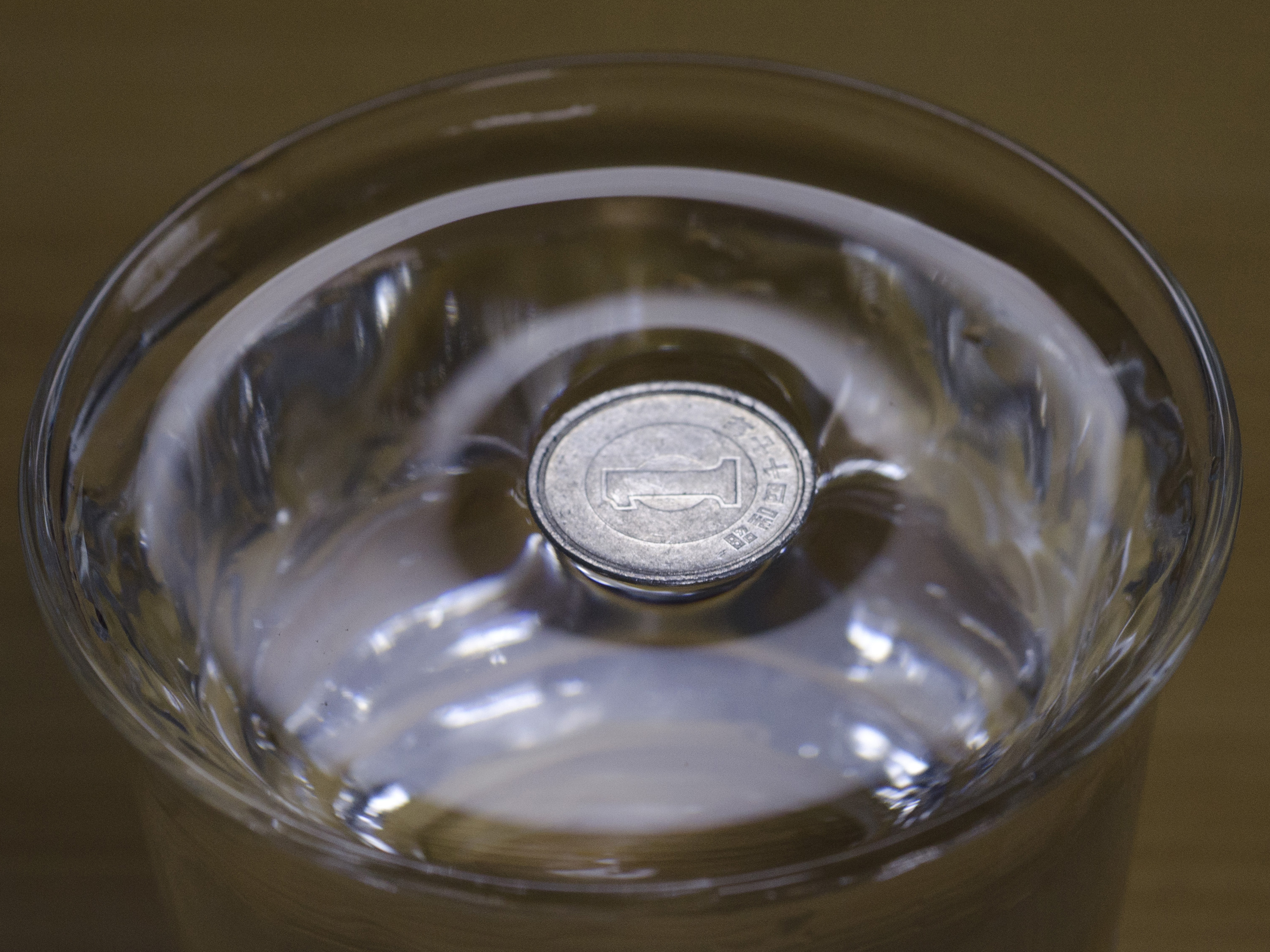
Modern 1-yen aluminum coins weigh exactly 1 gram each and can float on water due to surface tension.

Year(s)	Material	Diameter	Mass
Gold
1871	90% gold, 10% copper	13.5 mm	1.67 g
1874, 1876–1877, 1880, 1892	90% gold, 10% copper	12 mm	1.67 g
Silver
1870–1874	90% silver, 10% copper	38.5 mm	26.96 g
1874–1887	90% silver, 10% copper	38.6 mm	26.96 g
1888–1914	90% silver, 10% copper	38.1 mm	26.96 g
Modern
1948–1950	Brass	19.5 mm	3.2 g
1955–present	100% aluminum	20.0 mm	1.0 g

== Circulation figures ==
=== Meiji ===
The following are circulation figures for the coins minted between the 3rd and the 45th and last year of Emperor Meiji's reign. Coins for this period all begin with the Japanese symbol 明治 (Meiji). One yen trade dollars, minor varieties, and patterns are not included here. Countermarked yen ("Gin") are included in the original mintage totals.

- Inscriptions on Japanese coins from this period are read clockwise from right to left:

"Year" ← Number representing year of reign ← Emperor's name (e.g. 年 ← 五十三 ← 治明)

==== Gold ====
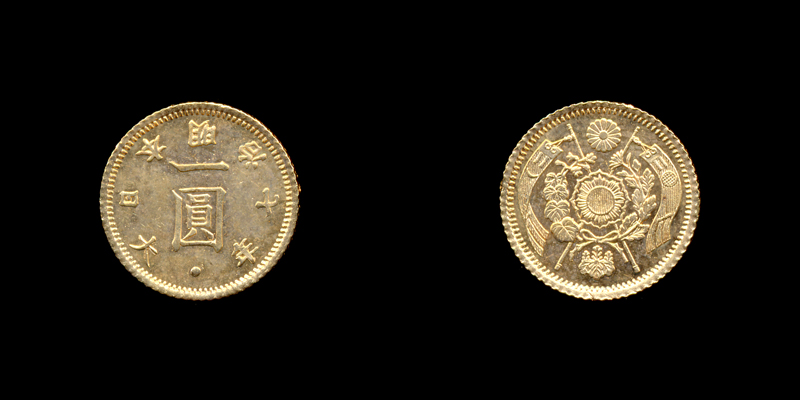
1 yen gold coin from 1874 (year 7) (one design used)

Year of reign	Japanese date	Gregorian date	Mintage
4th	四	1871	1,841,288
7th	七	1874	116,341
9th	九	1876	138
10th	十	1877	7,246
13th	三十	1880	112
25th	五十二	1892	Not circulated (Note: Several unique coins dated 1892 are known to have been produced to display at the World's Columbian Exposition. While there are no known existing examples of one yen gold coins dated 1892 (year 25), they are mentioned by Krause Publications.)

==== Silver ====
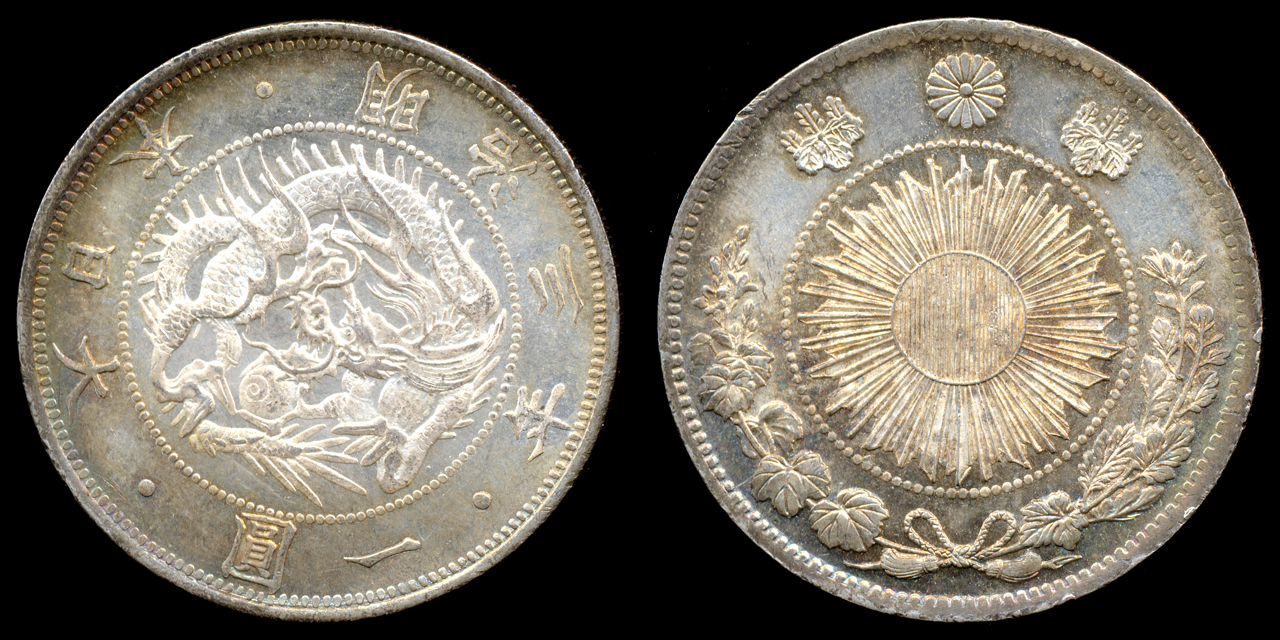
1 yen silver coin from 1870 (year 3) Design 1 - (1870)

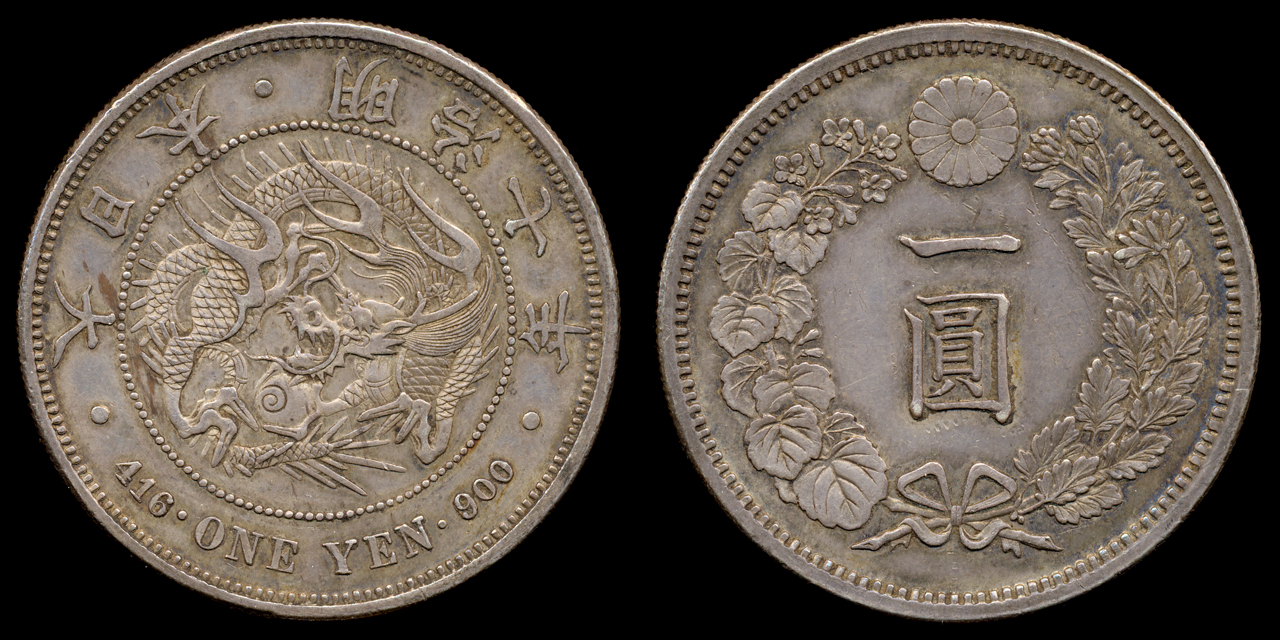
1 yen silver coin from 1874 (year 7) Design 2 - (1874–1914 (Note: The second and final silver coin design was also used during Taishō's reign.))

Year of reign	Japanese date	Gregorian date	Mintage
3rd	三	1870 (All types) (Note: These coins were struck in 1871 using three different major varieties.)	3,685,049
7th	七	1874	942,006
8th	八	1875	139,323
11th	一十	1878	856,378
12th	二十	1879	1,913,318
13th	三十	1880	5,247,432
14th	四十	1881	2,927,409
15th	五十	1882	5,089,064
16th	六十	1883	3,636,678
17th	七十	1884	3,599,192
18th	八十	1885	4,296,620
19th	九十	1886	9,084,262
20th	十二	1887	8,275,787
21st	一十二	1888	9,477,414
22nd	二十二	1889	9,295,348
23rd	三十二	1890	7,292,877
24th	四十二	1891	7,518,021
25th	五十二	1892 (Early variety) (Note: Two different main varieties exist for coins dated 1892, both of which have to do with the dragon design present on the obverse side of the coin. The first is known as the "early variety" where the dragon's flame extends between the fourth and fifth spine.)	11,187,613
25th	五十二	1892 (Late variety) (Note: The second variety is known as the "late variety" where the flame overlaps the third spine of the dragon.)	11,187,613
26th	六十二	1893	10,403,477
27th	七十二	1894	22,118,416
28th	八十二	1895	21,098,754
29th	九十二	1896	11,363,949
30th	十三	1897	2,448,694
34th	四十三	1901	1,256,252
35th	五十三	1902	668,782
36th	六十三	1903	5,131,096
37th	七十三	1904	6,970,843
38th	八十三	1905	5,031,503
39th	九十三	1906	3,471,297
41st	一十四	1908	334,705
45th	五十四	1912	5,000,000

=== Taishō ===
The following is a circulation figure for coins that were minted during the 3rd year of Taishō's reign. Coins from this period all begin with the Japanese symbol 大正 (Taishō). This was the final year one yen coins were minted in silver, and is a one year type.

- Inscriptions on Japanese coins from this period are read clockwise from right to left:

"Year" ← Number representing year of reign ← Emperor's name (Ex: 年 ← 三十 ← 正大)

Year of reign	Japanese date	Gregorian date	Mintage
3rd	三	1914	11,500,000

=== Shōwa ===
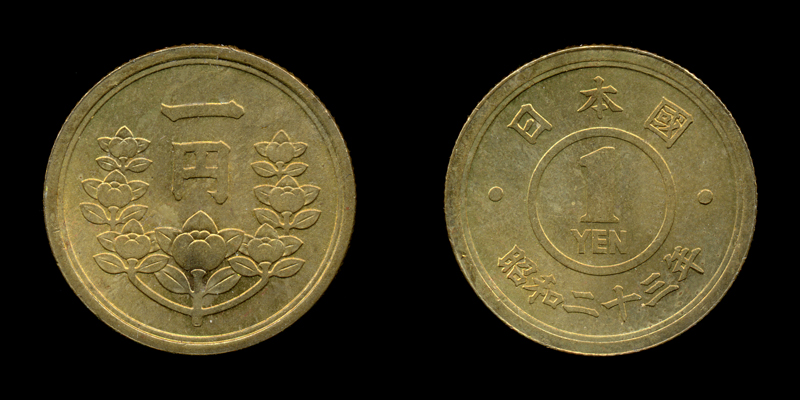
1 yen coin from 1948 (year 23) Design 1 (1948 - 1950)

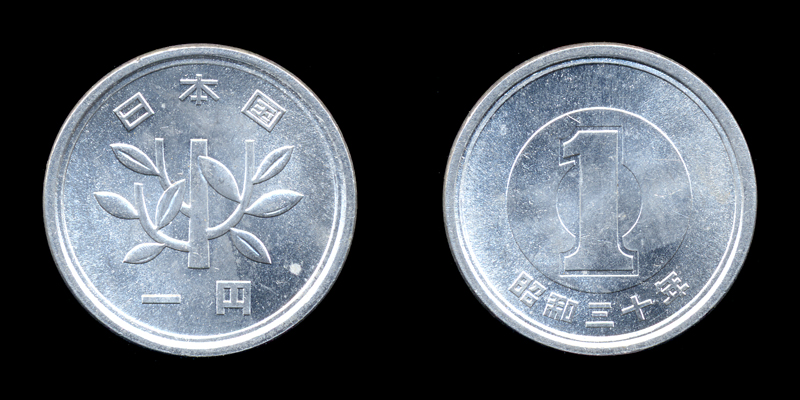
1 yen coin from 1955 (year 30) Design 2 (1955 - 1989)

The following are circulation dates which cover Emperor Showa's (Hirohito's) reign. The dates below correspond to the 23rd to the 64th (last) years of his reign. Inscriptions on coins for this period all begin with the kanji characters 昭和 (Shōwa).

These coins are read from left to right:

Emperor's name → Number representing year of reign → "Year" (Ex: 昭和 → 六十二 → 年).

Year of reign	Japanese date	Gregorian date	Mintage (Note: Mintages on the Japan Mint website are in thousands)
23rd	二十三	1948 (Brass)	451,170,000
24th	二十四	1949 (Brass)	451,170,000
25th	二十五	1950 (Brass)	451,170,000
30th	三十	1955	381,700,000
31st	三十一	1956	500,900,000
32nd	三十二	1957	492,000,000
33rd	三十三	1958	374,900,000
34th	三十四	1959	208,600,000
35th	三十五	1960	300,000,000
36th	三十六	1961	432,400,000
37th	三十七	1962	572,000,000
38th	三十八	1963	788,700,000
39th	三十九	1964	1,665,100,000
40th	四十	1965	1,743,256,000
41st	四十一	1966	807,344,000
42nd	四十二	1967	220,600,000
44th	四十四	1969	184,700,000
45th	四十五	1970	556,400,000
46th	四十六	1971	904,950,000
47th	四十七	1972	1,274,950,000
48th	四十八	1973	1,470,000,000
49th	四十九	1974	1,750,000,000
50th	五十	1975	1,656,150,000
51st	五十一	1976	928,850,000
52nd	五十二	1977	895,000,000
53rd	五十三	1978	864,000,000
54th	五十四	1979	1,015,000,000
55th	五十五	1980	1,145,000,000
56th	五十六	1981	1,206,000,000
57th	五十七	1982	1,017,000,000
58th	五十八	1983	1,086,000,000
59th	五十九	1984	981,850,000
60th	六十	1985	837,150,000
61st	六十一	1986	417,960,000
62nd	六十二	1987	955,775,000
63rd	六十三	1988	1,269,042,000
64th	六十四	1989	116,100,000

=== Heisei ===
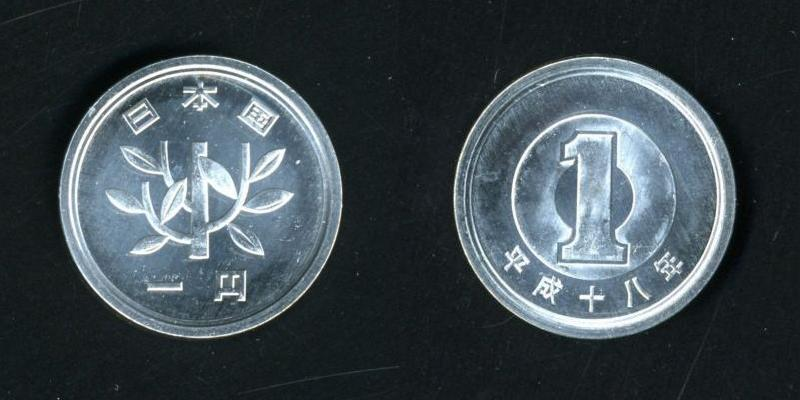
A one-yen coin of the Heisei era, year 18 (2006)

The following are circulation dates during the reign of Emperor Akihito, the Heisei era, who reigned from 1989 until his abdication in April 2019. The first year of his reign is marked with a 元 symbol on the coin as a one year type. Coins for this period all begin with the kanji characters 平成 (Heisei). One-yen coins dated between 2011 and 2013 were only released in mint sets. Mintage was briefly resumed in 2014 only for it to be halted again in 2016. No one yen coins were released for circulation for the remainder of the Heisei era.

These coins are read with from left to right:

Emperor's name → Number representing year of reign → "Year" (e.g. 平成 → 九 → 年).

Year of reign	Japanese date	Gregorian date	Mintage
1st	元	1989	2,366,970,000
2nd	二	1990	2,768,953,000
3rd	三	1991	2,301,120,000
4th	四	1992	1,299,130,000
5th	五	1993	1,261,240,000
6th	六	1994	1,040,767,000
7th	七	1995	1,041,874,000
8th	八	1996	942,213,000
9th	九	1997	783,086,000
10th	十	1998	452,612,000
11th	十一	1999	67,120,000
12th	十二	2000	12,026,000
13th	十三	2001	8,024,000
14th	十四	2002	9,667,000
15th	十五	2003	117,406,000
16th	十六	2004	52,903,000
17th	十七	2005	30,029,000
18th	十八	2006	129,594,000
19th	十九	2007	223,904,000
20th	二十	2008	134,811,000
21st	二十一	2009	48,003,000
22nd	二十二	2010	7,905,000
23rd	二十三	2011	—N/a (Note: These coins were sold exclusively in mint and proof sets. Their respective mintages are mentioned in those two articles.)
24th	二十四	2012	—N/a
25th	二十五	2013	—N/a
26th	二十六	2014	124,013,000
27th	二十七	2015	82,004,000
28th	二十八	2016	—N/a

=== Reiwa ===
The following are dates in the reign of the current Emperor. Naruhito acceded to the Chrysanthemum Throne on May 1, 2019 and he was formally enthroned on October 22, 2019. Coins for this period all begin with the kanji characters 令和 (Reiwa). The inaugural year coin (2019) was marked 元 (first) and debuted during the summer of that year. From 2019 to 2025 one-yen coins were sold exclusively in mint and proof sets.

These coins are read from left to right:

Emperor's name → Number representing year of reign → Year (e.g. 令和 → 元 → 年).

Year of reign	Japanese date	Gregorian date	Mintage
8th	八	2026	TBD

== Collecting ==
The value of any given coin is determined by survivability rate and condition as collectors in general prefer uncleaned appealing coins. One-yen coins are broken down into those struck in a gold alloy, and those struck in a silver alloy. Gold one-yen coins dated 1871 (year 4 of Meiji) are the most abundant as they have a mintage of almost 2 million coins. Two varieties were made this year that feature a "high" or "low" dot. Of these two, 1871 "low dot" coins are valued more compared to their "high dot" counterparts. Outside of this first year of issue, The Numismatist describes one-yen gold coins dated 1874 as "very rare" and the rest (1876 to 1892) as "extremely rare". One-yen gold coins dated 1880 (year 13) were never intended for circulation as they were part of presentation sets. It's now estimated that only 4 to 5 examples survived out of their original mintage of 112, one of which sold at auction in 2011 for $97,750 (USD).

Silver one-yen coins were minted for a longer duration which is almost entirely confined to the Meiji era. Coins dated 1870 (year 3 of Meiji) were struck in 1871 and feature at least 3 varieties when it comes to strokes in the old character for yen (圓). This first year of issue is now "rare" in any grade as many became worn from circulation or were chop-marked by merchants. The next few years of minting from 1874 to 1878 (year 7, 8, and 11) to saw a drop off in mintage numbers. In terms of rarity coins dated 1875 (year 8 of Meiji) are the rarest with just over 130,000 coins struck. These have a catalog value of over $5,000 (USD) in VF (very fine) condition. The legal tender status of one-yen silver coins for domestic use came to an end on July 31, 1898. All of the silver one-yen coins minted from 1871 to 1897 were subsequently kept away by the public, melted down by the Japanese government to provide bullion for subsidiary coins, or were countermarked "Gin" for use in Japanese-occupied Taiwan, Korea, and Lüshunkou. There are a few dates; 1901 (year 34), 1902 (year 35), and 1908 (year 41) which have mintages below a million that are worth a premium.

Counterfeiters have since taken advantage of collectors by targeting one-yen silver coins both rare and common. According to Numismatic Guaranty Corporation, Meiji era one-yen silver coins are "usually well struck with sharp details". Counterfeits on the other hand tend to have "details that are less sharp and more rounded". Dates targeted include 1870 (year 3), which is on NGC's top 25 list of most commonly found counterfeited world coins. Other cases include one in 2015 where a far more common 1891 (Meiji 24) date was deemed fake by ANACS. Counterfeiters do their best to seize upon any opportunity they can to make money. More commonly found dates are included as some collectors may let their guard down around them. Careful buying, and seeking authentication from grading services is recommended.
