= 50 yen note =

Japanese yen note

- Country: Japan
- Value: 50 Japanese yen
- Security features: Watermarks
- Years of printing: 1872–1899 (v. rare); 1951–1958

Obverse
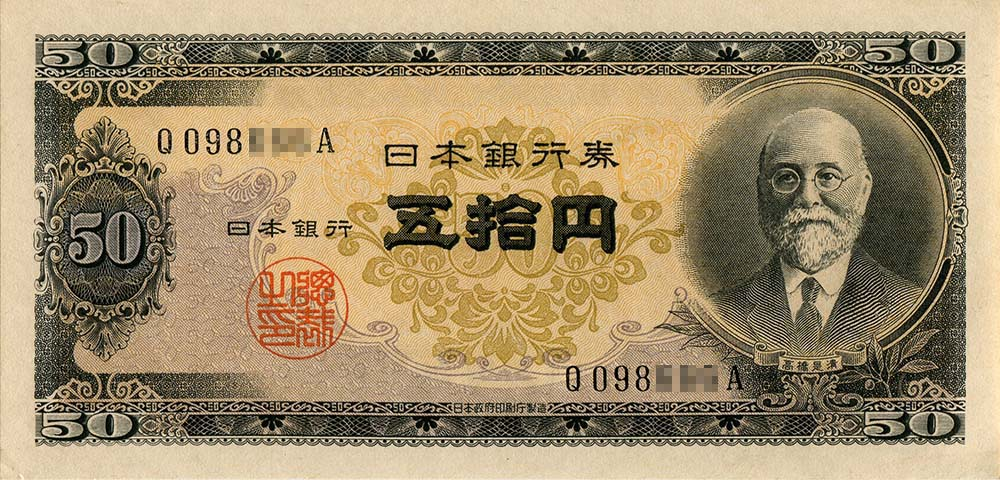
- Design: Portrait of Takahashi Korekiyo
- Design date: 1951

Reverse
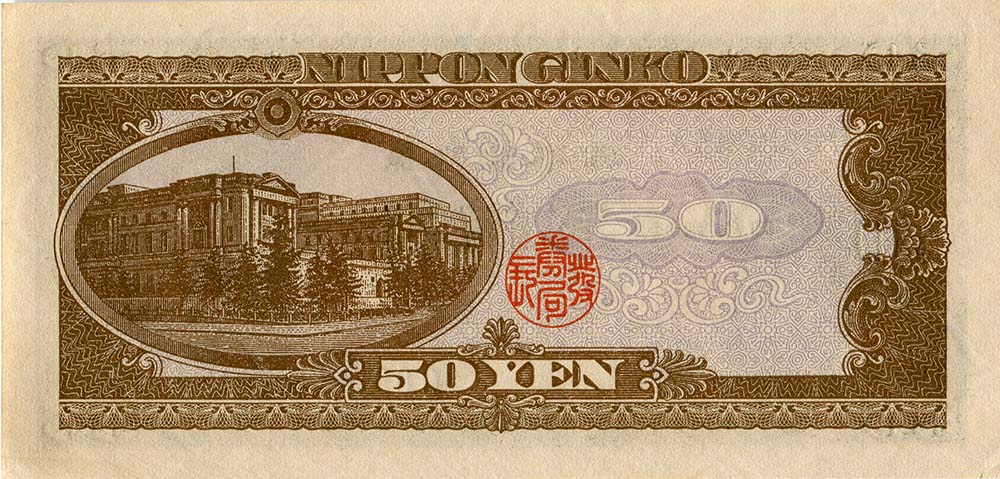
- Design: Bank of Japan building

The 50 yen note (五十円紙幣) was a denomination of Japanese yen that was issued from 1872 to 1958 (non-consecutively) in paper form. The first two issues for this denomination are rare for various reasons, including the latter of the two not being released for circulation. The final issue (also known as "B series") was short-lived as it was only issued from 1951 to 1958. Eventually a "stop payment" order was given causing the old 50 yen bills to be pulled from circulation in favor of the 50 yen coin. While "B series" notes continue to retain their legal tender status, they are now worth more as collectables.

== Issues ==
Old style 50 yen notes made during the Meiji era are considered to be very rare today with few existing examples, these were first issued in 1872 and later discontinued in 1899. The next series of 50 yen bills were intended to be issued in 1927, but were never released for circulation due to the Shōwa financial crisis. Two types of "Specimen" notes are known to exist which are now a rarity valued in the millions of yen. The final 50 yen notes were issued from 1951 to 1958, and are known as "B series" notes. An unofficial nickname dubbed "Takahashi notes" are also given for the "B series" as they feature former prime minister Takahashi Korekiyo on the front, and the Bank of Japan building on the back. The first 50 yen coins debuted in 1955, which was the beginning of the end for their 50 yen note counterpart as the two circulated concurrently. Finally a "stop payment" order was given in 1958 with the banks requesting the notes be withdrawn from circulation.

Currently all notes of the "B series" continue to remain legal tender and are redeemable at face value from banks. The "stop payment" date refers to when 50 yen notes ceased being paid from the central Bank of Japan to municipal banks, it has nothing to do with making the notes invalid. Spending 50 yen notes is not advised as they are worth much more than their face value on the collector's market.

== See also ==
- Banknotes of the Japanese yen
