= Countermarked yen ("Gin") =

Type of stamped Japanese currency

Countermarked one yen coin showing the "gin" stamp on the obverse left side. (stamped in Osaka)

Countermarked yen refers to Japanese trade dollars and 1 yen coins that are stamped 銀 (gin), literally meaning "silver" (pronounced [ɡʲĩɴ] with hard 'g'). The countermark was added by the Japanese government in 1897 to these coins dated up to that point. This came at a time when Japan went onto the gold standard prompting the government to confine these two denominations for use outside the mainland. Due to their eye appeal, these coins are now regarded as collectibles by preference.

== History ==
In 1871, a new coinage law was promulgated which helped with the final establishment of the gold standard system in Japan. However, the process wound up stalled as the Mexican dollar at the time was the universal medium of exchange. The Japanese government eventually came to the conclusion that the best interest of foreign trade was to issue silver one yen coins alongside standard gold coins. Silver one yen coins were first struck in 1871 for the mainland before being switched over for use outside of Japan in 1874. Trade silver dollars (also referred to as "Boyeki ichi yen gin") were first struck in 1875 and were legal tender only within the limits of the trade treaty ports. These trade dollars were only produced until 1877 before being discontinued in 1878. Japan had officially switched to a bimetallic standard which made one yen silver coins legal tender throughout the country.

The Japanese government officially recalled and demonetized all silver one yen pieces and Trade Dollars in 1897. Trade dollars in particular were recalled as their silver content was now greater than the competing Mexican Dollar. Many of these two types of coins were melted down to provide bullion for the production of subsidiary coins. Those that were not melted were either kept away by the public or sent overseas for trade. At least 20 million former Trade Dollars and 1 Yen coins were countermarked in 1897 with the character "Gin" for use in Korea, Lüshunkou, and Japanese-occupied Taiwan. The mark was put in place by the Japanese mints at Osaka and Tokyo to identify these coins as simply bullion. Those that were stamped on the left originated from Osaka, while those on the right were from Tokyo. By placing this mark the Japanese government prevented these coins from being sold back to them at a later date for gold. Silver one yen coins would not be struck again until 1901, when they served as a reserve fund for "Bank of Formosa" notes.

== Collecting ==
Countermarked yen are not considered damaged as the round "gin" mark meaning "silver" was officially placed by a government entity rather than by merchants (chopmarks). There are two varieties of the circle "gin" mark which are split by place of origin and their placement on the coins. "Gin" marked coins that were stamped in Osaka are located on the left side of the coin, and are the most commonly found variety with a rough estimate of 10 million coins marked. In contrast, those with a "significantly rarer" Tokyo "gin" mark have their stamp on the right side of the coin. This latter variety is roughly figured to be a mere 1 million coins in comparison to the former. The overall value of "gin" marked coins may be marginally affected depending on individual collector preferences. This applies less to "very rare" dates which will sell at a premium regardless of a "Gin" mark.

== See also ==
- Overstrike
- Overprint
- Privy mark
- Punch-marked coins
