= Naha Great Tug-of-War Festival =

Cultural event in Okinawa Prefecture, Japan

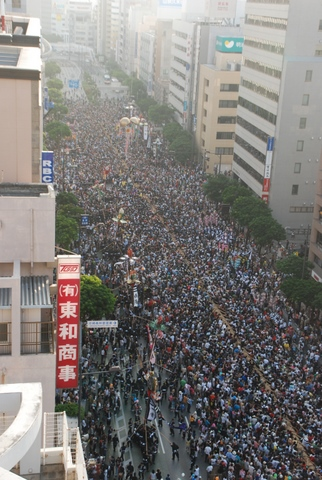
The main street in Naha city is filled with about 25,000 attendees.

The Naha Great Tug-of-War Festival (Japanese: 那覇大綱挽まつり, Hepburn: Naha Dai Tsunahiki Matsuri) is an annual event held in Naha, Okinawa Prefecture, Japan. Its roots may be traced back to the 15th century. Held on Route 58, it is a battle between the East and West teams.

== History ==
The event has its roots in the mid 15th century, in rural ceremonies to ask the gods for rain and plentiful crops. As the city of Naha developed, the ceremony transformed into a contest between different towns.

In 1812, due to arguments over the rules, they were codified in the Naha Tsunahiki rule book.

The festival was discontinued in 1935, and disrupted by the Battle of Okinawa, but was revived in its traditional form in 1971 to celebrate the recovery from the war and to commemorate the 50th anniversary of the organization of modern Naha.

== Festival ==
The event draws some 275,000 attendees annually, and is preceded on the prior day with a parade celebration on Kokusai Street (also in Naha). In 1997 the event was first logged in the Guinness Book of World Records as being the largest tug-of-war event in the world. The rope weighs over 40 metric tons.

=== Build-up ===
The build up to the festival begins with men dressed in traditional Okinawan dress standing on the rope facing in opposite directions to symbolize the battle between East and West. A myriad of performances take place along the rope's length, from martial artists of varying ages, to older women performing a sort of fan-dance. 14 flag bearers from various towns and villages in the east and west of the city, parade carrying huge flags (7–10 meters tall) traditionally symbolising the gods’ protection of the various villages taking part, along the length of the rope.

Just before the start of the match two men dressed in the dress of the Ryūkyūa kings stand each stand on a wooden platform which is hoisted in the air on the shoulders of men standing on the west and east sections of rope. The "kings" are carried on these platforms down the length of the rope, and then the two kings perform a ritual sword contest over the join of the ropes using naginatas.

=== Tug-of-war ===
The tug of war is an international event with Japanese nationals, American military, and tourists in attendance. Anyone can take part. The main rope, over 1.5 metres (4.9 ft) in diameter, has 280 very long, but much thinner ropes extending from it. It is these ropes that the participants pull these during the contest. The contest lasts for a maximum of 30 minutes and the challenge is to pull the other team a total of 5 meters. If neither side pulls the other the 5 meters, whichever side has pulled the other the furthest at the end of 30 minutes wins.

=== Aftermath ===
After one side is declared the victors, they are allowed to climb on top of their rope to celebrate. It is customary for participants to cut apart the rope, and take a length of it as a token, and so throngs of people using tools ranging from their pocket knives, scissors and hacksaws set on the rope, cutting lengths of it to commemorate the festival.

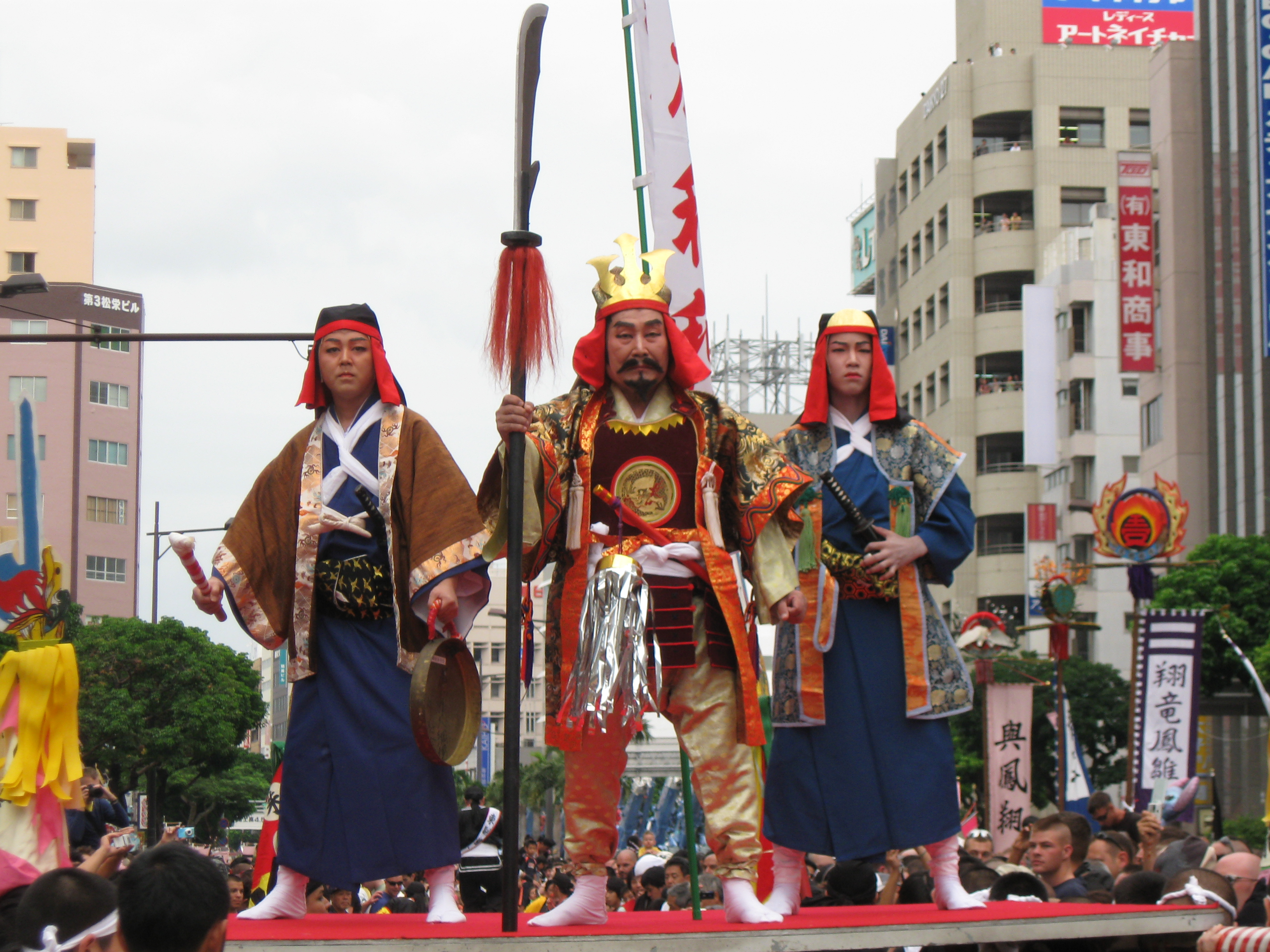

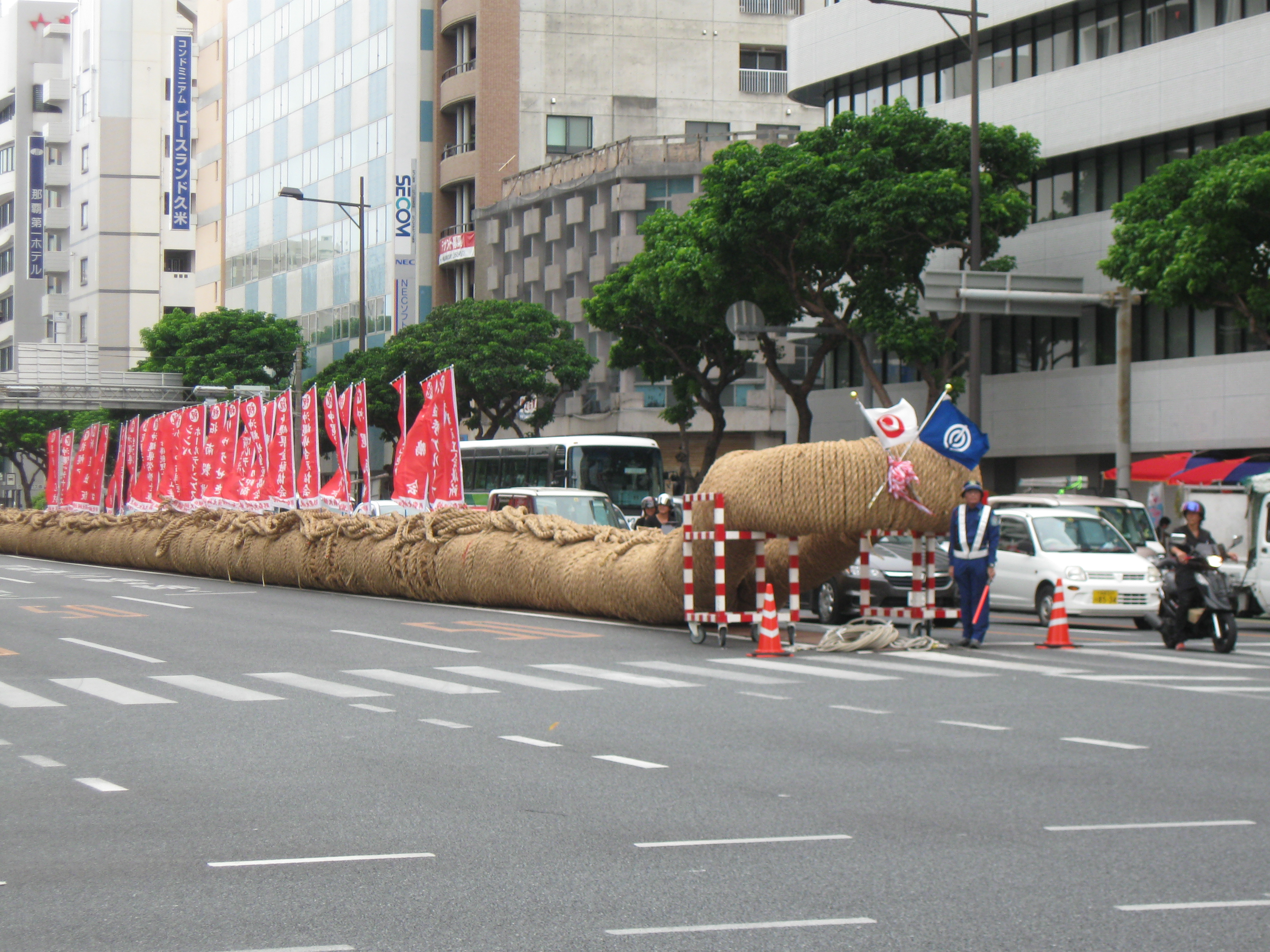

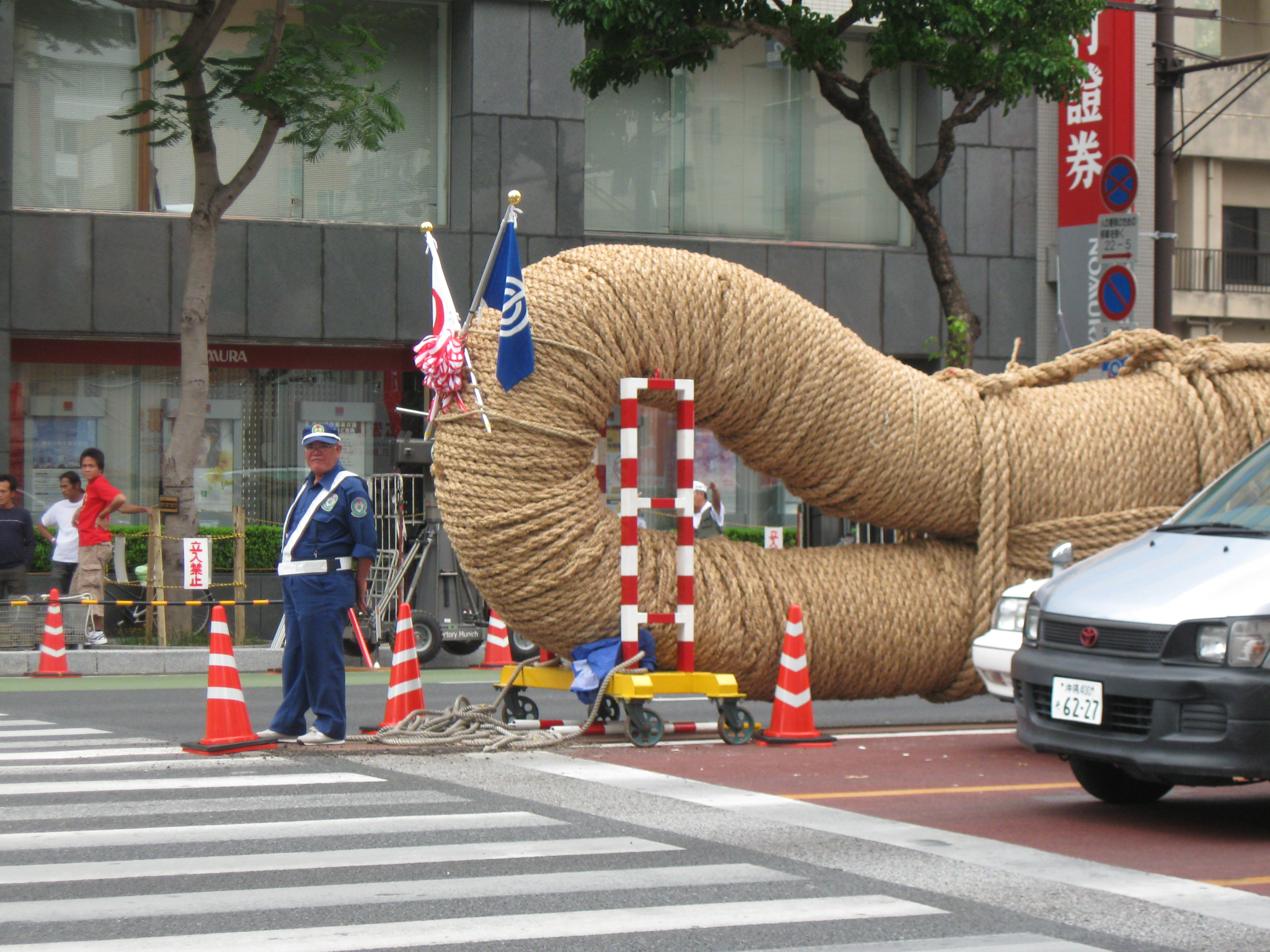

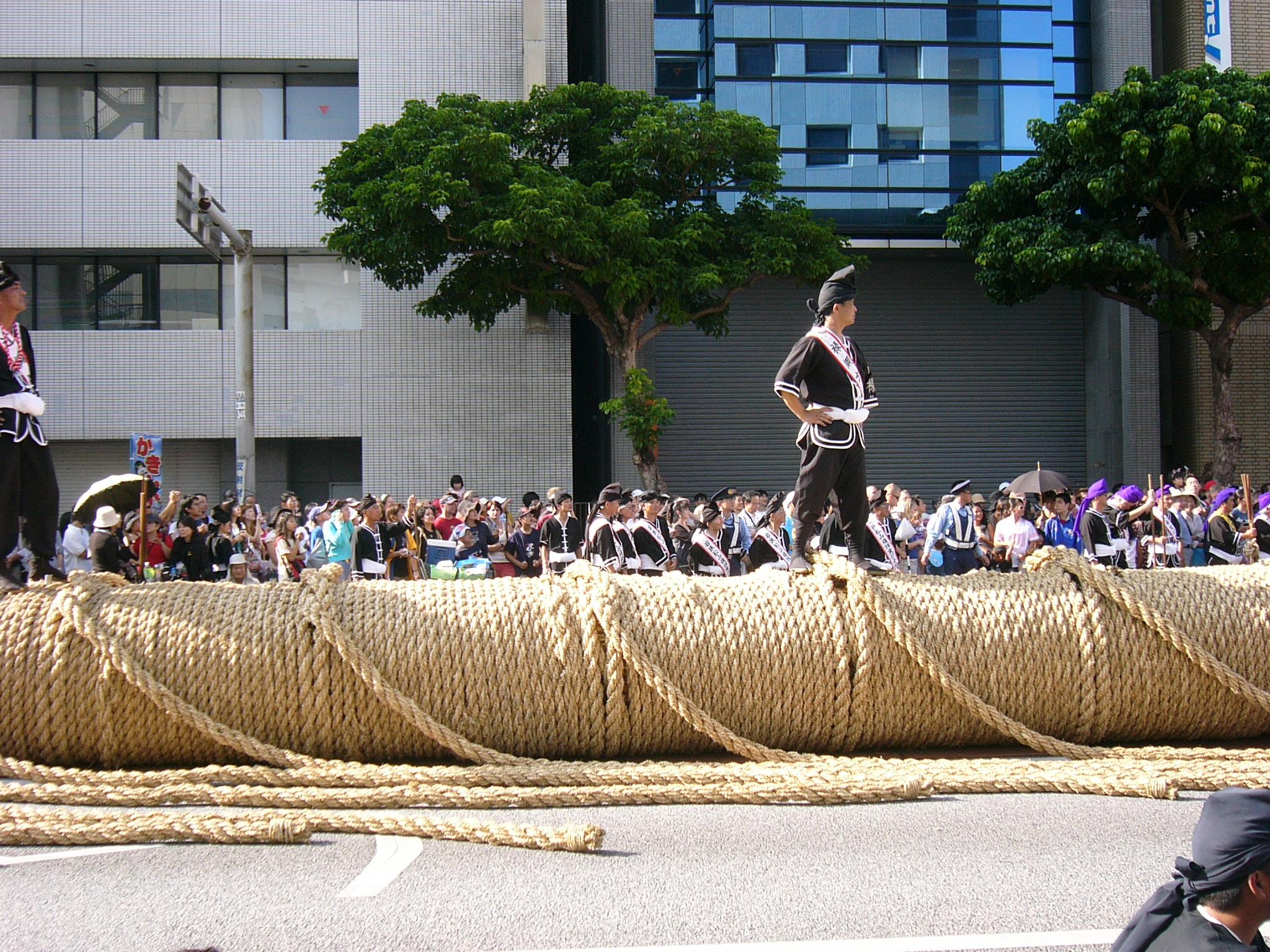
