= List of 500 yen commemorative coins =

Denomination of the Japanese yen

Five-hundred yen
- Japan
- Value: 500 Japanese yen
- Edge: Reeded
- Composition: Varies by issue
- Years of minting: 1985–2020 (Note: Non consecutive)
- Catalog number: -

Obverse
- Design: Varies by year

Reverse
- Design: Varies by year

The Japan Mint strikes commemorative issues of the 500 yen coin with distinct designs from the circulating currency. These coins are intended for collectors only and were never issued for circulation.

Early commemorative coins minted under the Shōwa era have their dates of reign written in kanji script. This practice was later replaced by adding Arabic numerals to reflect the current Emperor's year of reign.

== Composition ==
| Years | Material |
|---|---|
| 1985–1999 | 75% copper, 25% nickel (Cupronickel) |
| 2002–2009 | 72% copper, 20% zinc, 8% nickel (Nickel-brass) |
| 2008–present | 75% copper, 12.5% zinc, 12.5% nickel (Bi-metallic) |

== 1985–1999 (Cupronickel) ==
| Image | Japanese date | Gregorian date | Mintage (Note: Proof mintages are in parentheses) | Reason |
|---|---|---|---|---|
| | 六十 (60); Shōwa (Note: 60th year of Emperor Shōwa (Hirohito)'s reign, Emperor Heisei (Akihito) was not crowned emperor until 1989) | 1985 | 70,000,000 | Tsukuba Exposition '85 |
| | 六十 (60); Shōwa | 1985 | 70,000,000 | Centennial of the Foundation of the Cabinet System |
| | 六十一 (61); Shōwa | 1986 | 50,000,000 | Hirohito's 60th year of reign |
| | 六十二 (62); Shōwa | 1987 | Unknown | Hirohito's 60th year of reign |
| | 63; Shōwa | 1988 | 20,000,000 | Opening of Seto Bridge |
| | 63; Shōwa | 1988 | 20,000,000 | Opening of Seikan Tunnel (1988) |
| | 2 Heisei | 1990 | 30,000,000 | Enthronement of Emperor Akihito |
| | 四 (4); Heisei | 1992 | 19,950,000 (50,000) | 20th anniversary of the reversion of Okinawa to Japan |
| | 五 (5); Heisei | 1993 | 29,800,000 (200,000) | Wedding of Crown Prince Naruhito |
| | 6 Heisei | 1994 | 19,900,000 (100,000) | Opening of Kansai International Airport |
| | 6 Heisei | 1994 | 9,900,000 (100,000) | 1994 Asian Games - Running |
| | 6 Heisei | 1994 | 9,900,000 (100,000) | 1994 Asian Games - Swimming |
| | 6 Heisei | 1994 | 9,900,000 (100,000) | 1994 Asian Games - Jumping |
| | 9 Heisei | 1997 | 19,867,000 (133,000) | Nagano Olympics (Snowboarding) |
| | 9 Heisei | 1997 | 19,867,000 (133,000) | Nagano Olympics (Bobsledding) |
| | 10; Heisei | 1998 | 19,867,000 (133,000) | Nagano Olympics (Acrobatic Skier) |
| | 11; Heisei | 1999 | 14,900,000 (Unknown) | 10th anniversary of the enthronement of Akihito |

== 2002–2009 (Nickel-brass) ==
| Image | Japanese date | Gregorian date | Mintage | Reason |
|---|---|---|---|---|
| | 14; Heisei (Note: 14th year of Emperor Heisei (Akihito)'s reign) | 2002 | 10,000,000 | 2002 FIFA World Cup - (Europe & Africa) |
| | 14; Heisei | 2002 | 10,000,000 | 2002 FIFA World Cup - (Asia & Oceania) |
| | 14; Heisei | 2002 | 10,000,000 | 2002 FIFA World Cup - (North & South America) |
| | 17; Heisei | 2005 | 8,241,000 | EXPO 2005 AICHI JAPAN |
| | 17; Heisei | 2005 | 50,000 (Note: This is the only silver 500 yen commemorative coin ever issued) (Silver) | Opening of Chūbu Centrair International Airport |
| | 19; Heisei | 2007 | 6,600,000 | 50th anniversary of the Japanese Antarctic Research Expedition |
| | 20; Heisei | 2008 | 4,800,000 | Centenary of Japanese Immigration to Brazil - Japan-Brazil Year of Exchange |
| | 21; Heisei | 2009 | 9,950,000 (Note: 50,000 proof coins were made) | 20th anniversary of the enthronement of Akihito |

== 2008–2016 ==
60th Anniversary of Enforcement of the Local Autonomy Law

Starting in 2008, a program similar to the American 50 State Quarters was put into place which honors all 47 of Japan's prefectures. This was done by celebrating the 60th Anniversary of Enforcement of the Local Autonomy Law in the form of 47 different commemorative coins (designs on obverse side). This program ran until 2016, concluding with the final issues for Tokyo and Fukushima.

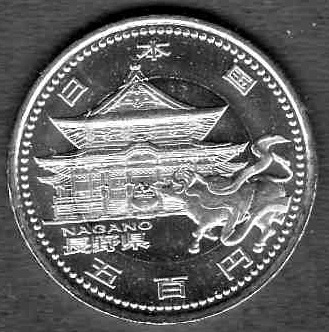
Various obverse designs have been used for the different prefectures (Nagano shown here)

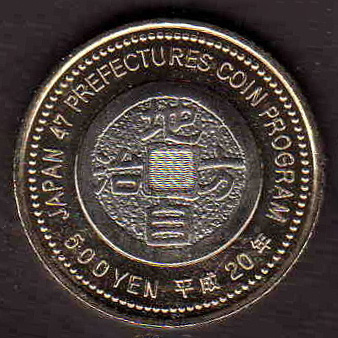
Reverse design for the Local Autonomy Law series

| Japanese date | Gregorian date | Prefecture | Mintage | Elements depicted |
|---|---|---|---|---|
| 20 | 2008 | Hokkaido | 2,100,000 | Lake Toya and the former Hokkaido government office building |
| 20 | 2008 | Kyoto | 2,050,000 | Scene 2 from Chapter 49 of The Tale of Genji |
| 20 | 2008 | Shimane | 1,970,000 | Dōtaku discovered from the Kamoiwakura Remains in Unnan City |
| 21 | 2009 | Nagano | 1,830,000 | Zenkoji Temple and an Ox (Bodhisattva of Mercy) |
| 21 | 2009 | Niigata | 1,840,000 | Pair of Japanese Crested Ibises and Rice Terrace |
| 21 | 2009 | Ibaraki | 1,870,000 | Kairakuen Garden and Japanese Apricot Tree |
| 21 | 2009 | Nara | 1,800,000 | Kentoshi-sen (ships used for royal envoys to China during the Tang dynasty) |
| 22 | 2010 | Kochi | 1,960,000 | Bust of Sakamoto Ryōma (born in Kōchi) |
| 22 | 2010 | Gifu | 1,860,000 | Shirakawa-go and Chinese milk vetch |
| 22 | 2010 | Fukui | 1,830,000 | Fukuiraptor and Fukuisaurus (discovered in the prefecture) |
| 22 | 2010 | Aichi | 1,950,000 | Aichi Prefectural Government Office and rabbit-ear iris |
| 22 | 2010 | Aomori | 1,900,000 | Sannai-Maruyama Site and Clay Figurine |
| 22 | 2010 | Saga | 1,910,000 | Ōkuma Shigenobu, and his associated craft Saga Nishiki (Note: Shigenobu introduced Saga Nishiki and Kashima Nishiki overseas) |
| 23 | 2011 | Toyama | 1,800,000 | Owara Kaze-no-bon Festival |
| 23 | 2011 | Tottori | 1,770,000 | Sanbutsu-ji Temple (The Nageire Hall) |
| 23 | 2011 | Kumamoto | 1,870,000 | Kumamoto Castle |
| 23 | 2011 | Shiga | 1,770,000 | Biwa Catfish and Round Crucian Carp |
| 23 | 2011 | Iwate | 1,790,000 | Kyokusui-no-en (Water Poetry Party) at Mōtsū-ji temple |
| 23 | 2011 | Akita | 1,740,000 | Nobu Shirase and the Akita Kantō festival |
| 24 | 2012 | Okinawa | 1,760,000 | Naha Tug-of-war and Eisa Folk dance |
| 24 | 2012 | Kanagawa | 1,890,000 | Daibutsu (Great Buddha) of Kamakura |
| 24 | 2012 | Miyazaki | 1,740,000 | Miyazaki Prefectural Government - Main Building |
| 24 | 2012 | Tochigi | 1,800,000 | Nemuri-neko (Sleeping cat) and Sparrows (sculptures) |
| 24 | 2012 | Oita | 1,790,000 | Usuki Stone Buddha |
| 24 | 2012 | Hyōgo | 1,800,000 | Pair of Oriental storks |
| 25 | 2013 | Miyagi | 1,700,000 | Sendai Tanabata Festival |
| 25 | 2013 | Hiroshima | 1,700,000 | Atomic Bomb Dome and Memorial Park |
| 25 | 2013 | Gunma | 1,720,000 | Keystone, and a female worker from the Tomioka Silk Mill |
| 25 | 2013 | Okayama | 1,660,000 | Okayama Korakuen Garden |
| 25 | 2013 | Shizuoka | 1,700,000 | Mount Fuji and a tea plantation |
| 25 | 2013 | Yamanashi | 1,670,000 | Mount Fuji and grapes |
| 25 | 2013 | Kagoshima | 1,660,000 | Mount Sakurajima |
| 26 | 2014 | Ehime | 1,650,000 | Nishiseto Expressway and the islands of Ehime |
| 26 | 2014 | Yamagata | 1,660,000 | Jōmon Dogū (prehistoric goddess figure) |
| 26 | 2014 | Mie | 1,670,000 | Kumano Kodō Iseji |
| 26 | 2014 | Kagawa | 1,630,000 | Scenery of Sanuki as viewed from Kotohira-gū shrine |
| 26 | 2014 | Saitama | 1,780,000 | Saitama Stadium 2002 |
| 26 | 2014 | Ishikawa | 1,660,000 | Mount Haku as seen from Kibagata Park and the Abare Festival |
| 27 | 2015 | Yamaguchi | 1,610,000 | Five-story pagoda of Ruriko-ji Temple |
| 27 | 2015 | Tokushima | 1,630,000 | Awa Dance Festival |
| 27 | 2015 | Fukuoka | 1,680,000 | Kyushu National Museum, Dazaifu Tenmangū Shrine, and Plum Blossoms |
| 27 | 2015 | Wakayama | 1,610,000 | Nachi Falls |
| 27 | 2015 | Osaka | 1,700,000 | Burial mound of Emperor Nintoku |
| 27 | 2015 | Nagasaki | 1,600,000 | Oura Cathedral and a stained glass rose window |
| 27 | 2015 | Chiba | 1,680,000 | Kujūkuri Beach |
| 28 | 2016 | Fukushima | 1,620,000 | Sōma's Nomaoi Festival |
| 28 | 2016 | Tokyo | 1,720,000 | Tokyo Station (Marunouchi Building) |

== 2017–present ==
| Image | Japanese date | Gregorian date | Mintage | Reason |
|---|---|---|---|---|
| | 31; Heisei | 2019 | 5,000,000 | 30th anniversary of the enthronement of Akihito |
| | 元 (1); Reiwa | 2019 | 5,000,000 (Note: 30,000 of these coins were issued alongside their 10,000 yen counterparts via coin sets.) | Enthronement of Emperor Naruhito to the Chrysanthemum Throne |
| | 2 Reiwa | 2020 | 4,000,000 | 2020 Tokyo Summer Olympics: Raijin |
| | 2 Reiwa | 2020 | 4,000,000 | 2020 Tokyo Summer Paralympics: Fujin |
| —N/a | 7 Reiwa | 2025 | | Expo 2025 Osaka Kansai |
