= 5 yen coin =

Low denomination of Japanese yen

Five yen
- Japan
- Value: 5 Japanese yen
- Mass: 3.75 g
- Diameter: 22 mm
- Thickness: 1.5 mm
- Center hole diameter: 5 mm
- Composition: c. 65% Cu c. 35% Zn
- Years of minting: 1870–present
- Catalog number: KM 72, 72a, 96.1 and 96.2

Obverse
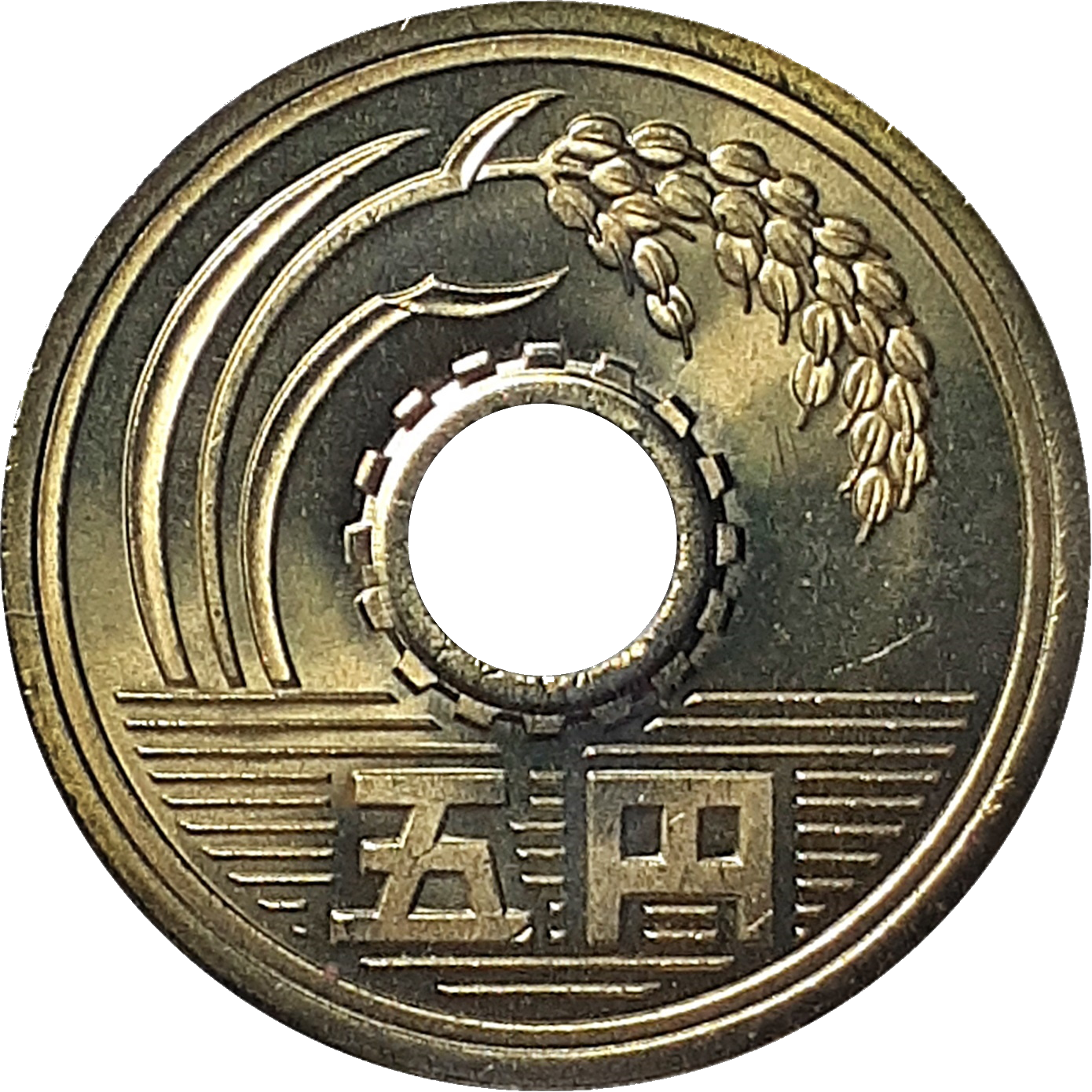
- Design: Rice, water and gear
- Design date: 1959

Reverse
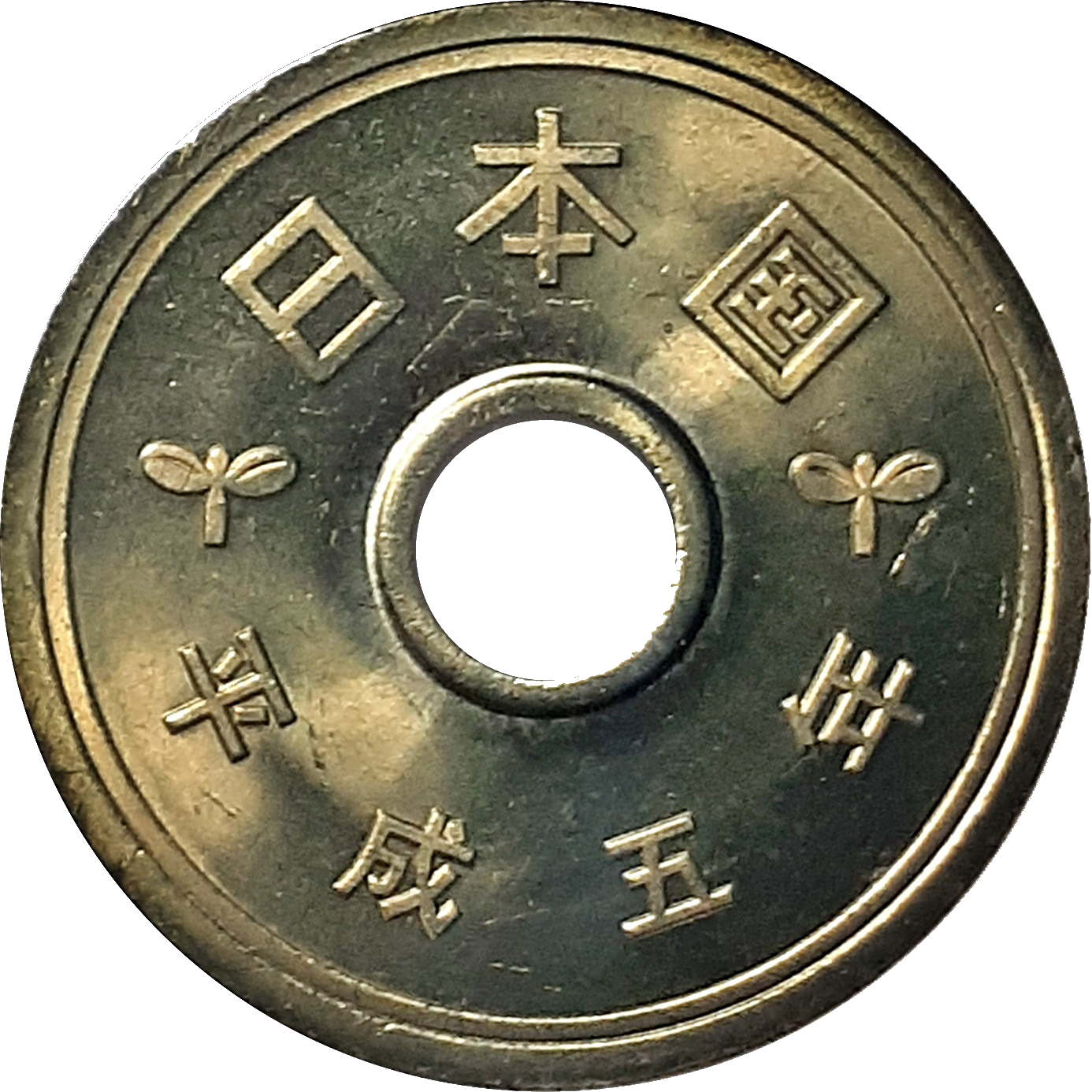
- Design: Tree sprouts
- Design date: 1959

The 5-yen coin (五円硬貨, Go-en kōka) is a denomination of the Japanese yen. The current design was first minted in 1959, using Japanese characters known as the "new script" and kanji in the gothic style, and were also minted from 1948 to 1958 using "old-script" Japanese characters in the kaisho style. Five-yen coins date to 1870 (when, due to the much higher value of the yen, they were minted in gold). The modern-day coin was first produced in 1948 with a differently styled inscription. This was changed in 1959 and the design has remained unchanged since.

The obverse of the coin depicts a rice plant growing out of the water, with "five yen" written in kanji; the reverse is stamped with "Japan" and the year of issue, also in kanji, separated by sprouts of a tree. The three graphic elements of the coin represent agriculture and fisheries, the key elements of the Japanese first-sector economy. Around the central hole, there is a gear that represents industry. It is the only Japanese coin in circulation to lack Arabic numerals on either side.

== History ==
=== Gold five yen (1870–1930) ===
Five yen coins were first struck in gold for the Japanese government in 1870 at the San Francisco Mint. During this time a new mint was being established at Osaka, which did not receive the gold bullion needed for coinage until the following year. The yen as a unit of currency was officially adopted by the Meiji government in an act signed on June 27, 1871. For this particular denomination, its not known if any five-yen coins dated 1871 (year 4) were actually struck that year as official records have coinage beginning in 1872. The first and second five yen coin designs feature a dragon figure on the obverse surrounded by legends, while the reverse features the emblem of the Imperial family. (Note: In numismatic terminology, a "legend" is a formal inscription found around the margin of a coin.) Each coin was initially struck in .900 fine gold with a weight of 8.3g, and a diameter of 23.8mm. The diameter was later reduced to 21.8mm when the second design was introduced in 1872. Five yen coins continued to be struck uninterrupted until 1879, when for an unknown reason none were recorded as minted. Coinage resumed in 1880 and remained unchanged until 1897 when Japan officially switched from a silver standard to a gold standard. During this time the gold five yen coin was given a third and final new design. The diameter was reduced from 21.8mm down to 16.9mm, and the weight was changed from 8.3 to 4.2 grams. Redemption of old silver coins for new gold coins at par began on October 1, 1897, and lasted until closure on July 31, 1898.

During the Taishō era the production of five yen coins was impacted by World War I as a gold embargo was imposed in 1917 by the United States. Even though this embargo was later lifted in June 1919, the Japanese government continued it by importing gold heavily to re-enforce the gold reserve of the Bank of Japan. Government officials at the time had the opinion that no inflation could take place so long as the percentage of gold cover had not been lowered. This embargo was not absolute however, as it was recorded that some gold coins were paid out between 1920 and 1928 in very small amounts. The gold embargo was later lifted in January 1930, only for it to be re-imposed on December 31, 1931. Five yen coins were last minted in gold during this brief time to act as a reserve for gold certificates. None of these coins were in general use afterwards as the medium of commerce consisted of nonconvertible 5 yen banknotes.

=== Modern five yen (1948-) ===
Almost 20 years would pass before the Japanese government authorized the production of a new five yen coin. These new coins were first struck in 1948 and are made of a brass alloy consisting of 60 to 70% copper, and 30 to 40% zinc. Using this type of alloy combination is now a remnant from when World War II era weapons were scrapped to produce the coins. These coins feature a pigeon within a circle on one side and the National Diet on the other and were only minted for two years. Two different varieties were made in 1949 which included the old pigeon type coins, and new coins featuring a hole in the center. These first holed five yen coins use an old style Japanese script known as Kaisho. The Japanese government added the hole in the center of the coin to save material costs. The overall design of the coin featuring rice, water and a gear on the obverse, and tree sprouts on the reverse has not changed since this time. The final design which is minted today uses a modern style script which was first added in 1959.

Five yen coins made headlines in 1999 in regards to the nuclear accident at Tokai, Ibaraki. Physicists Masuchika Kohno and Yoshinobu Koizumi showed how the coin could be used to estimate neutron dosage to the surrounding population, by measuring its zinc isotope ratios. They concluded that the coin could offer information about the total neutron effect during the accident. The coins could also give insight about shielding modern Japanese houses as the coins were recovered from indoors.

Very few five yen coins were minted between 2009 and 2013, making them premium coins for collectors as coins for the latter four years are confined to mint sets. This was due to an increase in the usage of electronic currency which inhibited demand for new coins. Mintage figures recovered in 2014 as general production resumed until 2022, when 5 yen coins were again confined to mint sets.

== Cultural significance ==
The Japanese for "five yen," go en (五円) is a homophone with go-en (御縁), "en" being a word for causal connection or relationship, and "go" being a respectful prefix. As a result, five-yen coins are commonly given as donations at Shinto shrines with the intention of establishing a good connection with the deity of the shrine. Several different interpretations of this "luck" exist depending on how many five yen coins are offered. While it is generally said that offering "lucky" 5 yen coins as tribute is good, there are others who disagree. Those who hold this opposing position argue that "perforated coins" such as "5 yen" and "50 yen" are unlucky due to their central holes. Shrines in general depend on offerings in either case to fund maintenance, repairs, and operations for the deity or deities enshrined. There are also other forms of offerings welcomed at shrines depending on the place and customs allowed. According to a priest at Chichibu Shrine, harvested rice was historically given as Shinto deities do not like cash itself as tribute. Five yen coins are also sometimes given as gifts of "good fortune" during the Japanese New Year. These gifts are traditionally given to children in decorated envelopes called "Otoshidama" (年玉), with the total amount of money included depending on age.

== Composition ==
Years	Material
1870–1930	90% gold, 10% copper
1948–present	65% copper, 35% zinc

== Circulation figures ==
=== Meiji ===
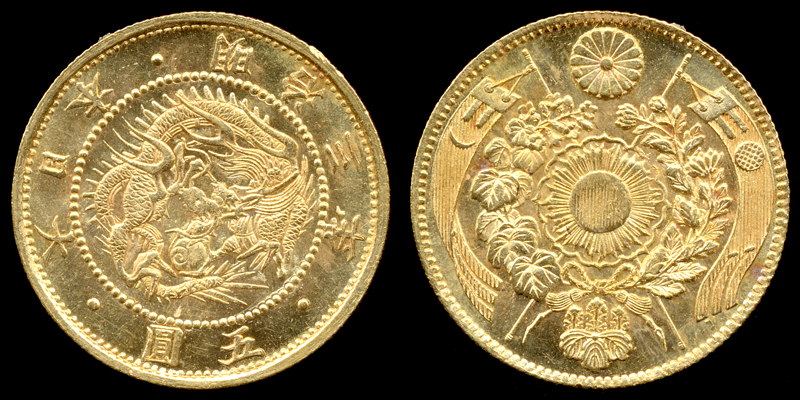
5 yen coin from 1870 (year 3) Design 1 - (1870–1871)

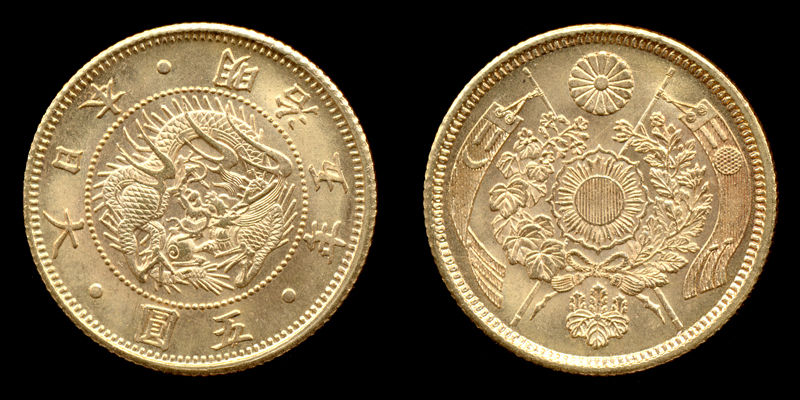
5 yen coin from 1872 (year 5) Design 2 - (1872–1897)

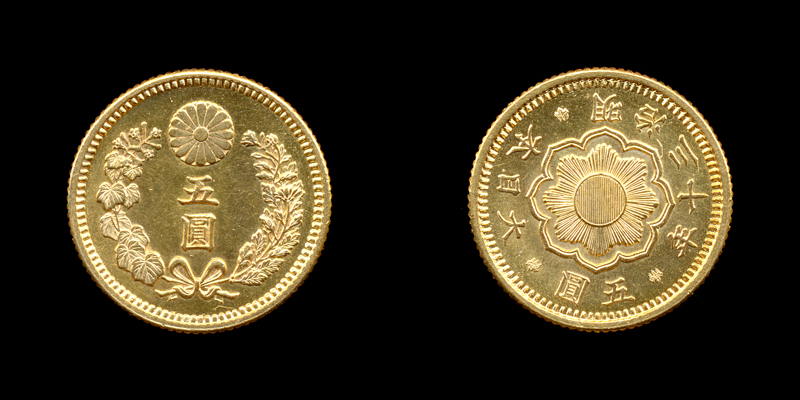
5 yen coin from 1897 (year 30) Design 3 - (1897–1930 (Note: The third and final gold coin design was also used during Taishō, and Shōwa's reign.))

The following are circulation figures for the coins that were minted between the 3rd and the 45th (last) year of Meiji's reign. Coins for this period all begin with the Japanese symbol 明治 (Meiji). One yen trade dollars and/or patterns are not included here.

- Inscriptions on Japanese coins from this period are read clockwise from right to left:

"Year" ← "Number representing year of reign" ← "Emperor's name" (Ex: 年 ← 五十三 ← 治明)

Year of reign	Japanese date	Gregorian date	Mintage
3rd	三	1870	273,536
4th	四	1871	Unknown
5th	五	1872	1,057,628
6th	六	1873	3,148,925
7th	七	1874	728,082
8th	八	1875	181,728
9th	九	1876	146,226
10th	十	1877	136,271
11th	一十	1878	101,198
13th	三十	1880	78,704
14th	四十	1881	149,249
15th	五十	1882	113,015
16th	六十	1883	108,746
17th	七十	1884	113,768
18th	八十	1885	200,607
19th	九十	1886	179,849
20th	十二	1887	179,303
21st	一十二	1888	165,794
22nd	二十二	1889	353,914
23rd	三十二	1890	238,076
24th	四十二	1891	216,089
25th	五十二	1892	263,103
26th	六十二	1893	260,424
27th	七十二	1894	314,337
28th	八十二	1895	320,090
29th	九十二	1896	224,325
30th	十三	1897 (Type 1)	107,352
30th	十三	1897 (Type 2) (Note: Two coin designs were made in 1897, the second type is smaller as the weight was changed from 8.3 to 4.2 grams)	111,776
31st	一十三	1898	55,888
36th	六十三	1903	21,956
44th	四十四	1911	59,880
45th	五十四	1912	59,880

=== Taishō ===
The following are circulation figures for the coins that were minted during the 2nd and 13th year of Taishō's reign. Coins from this period all begin with the Japanese symbol 大正 (Taishō).

- Inscriptions on Japanese coins from this period are read clockwise from right to left:

"Year" ← "Number representing year of reign" ← "Emperor's name" (Ex: 年 ← 三十 ← 正大)

Year of reign	Japanese date	Gregorian date	Mintage
2nd	二	1913	89,820
13th	三十	1924	76,037

=== Shōwa ===
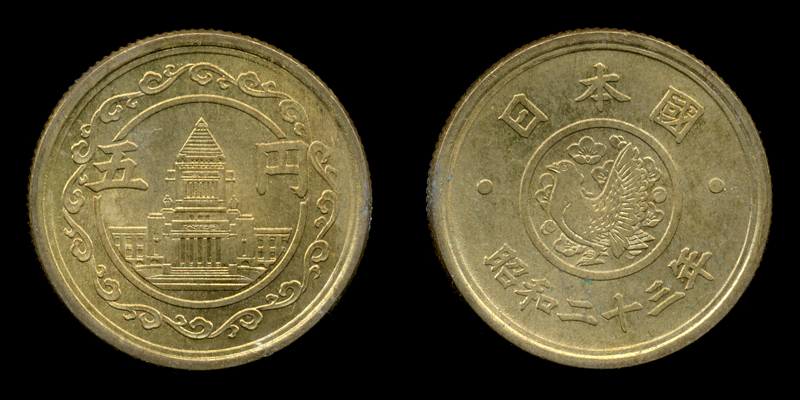
5 yen coin from 1948 (year 23) Design 1 - (1948–1949)

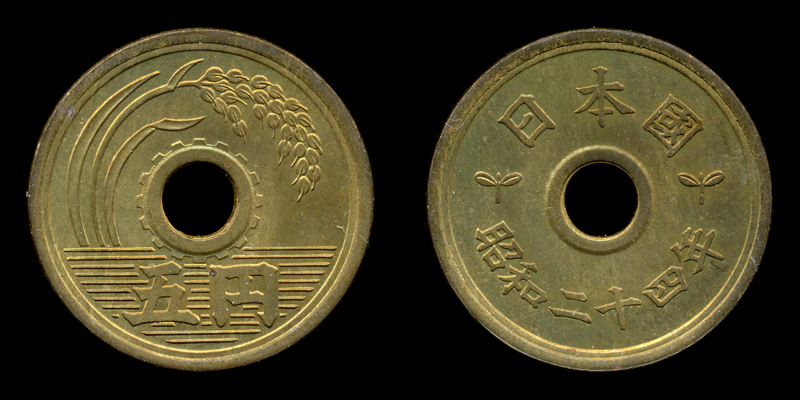
5 yen coin from 1949 (year 24) Design 2 - (1949–1958)

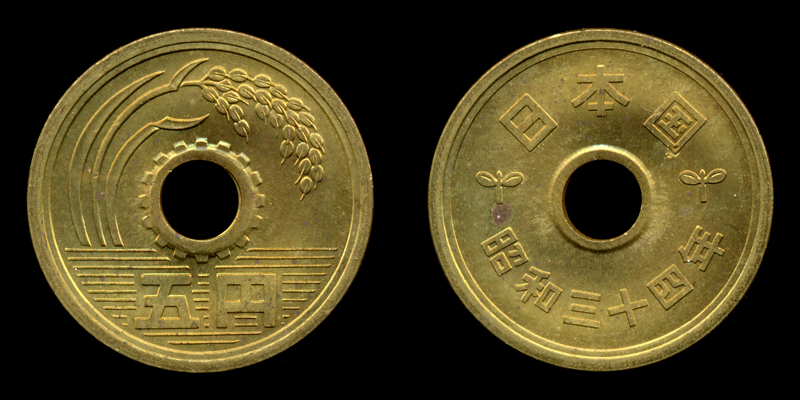
5 yen coin from 1959 (year 34) Design 3 - (1959–present)

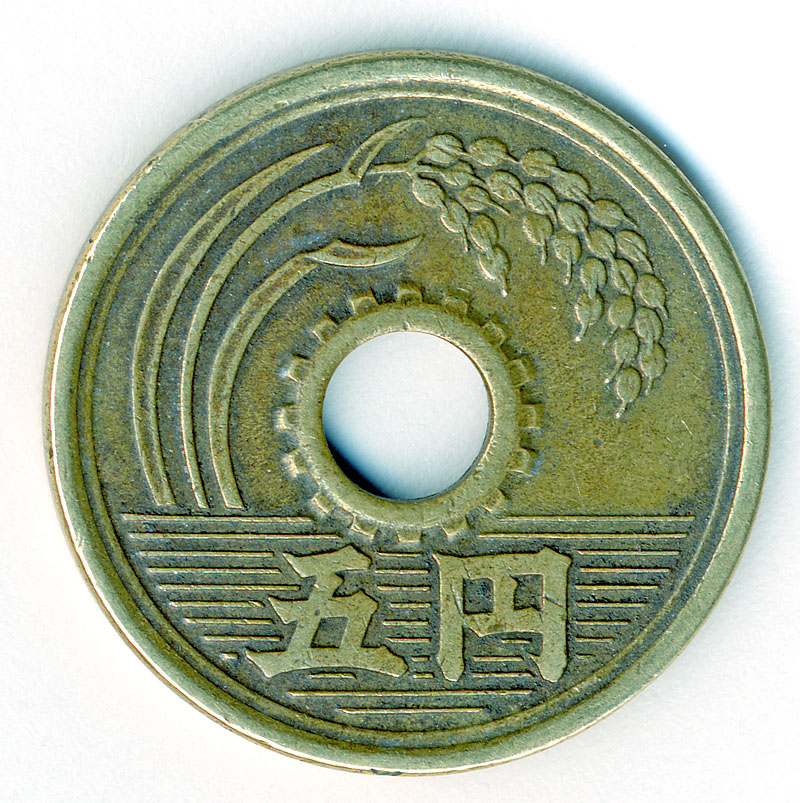
Closeup of the "Old script" design (Pre-1959)

The following are circulation dates which cover Emperor Hirohito's reign. The dates below correspond with the 23rd to the 64th year (last) of his reign. All five yen coins that were made before 1959 use kyūjitai, or old script Japanese. In 1949 only, two different styles of writing were used before a more modern one was established in 1950. This second style of writing was used until 1958 when the current script of Japanese took its place in the following year. Coins for this period will all begin with the Japanese symbol 昭和 (Shōwa).

- Japanese coins are read with a left to right format:

"Emperor's name" → "Number representing year of reign" → "Year" (Ex: 昭和 → 四十八 → 年).

Year of reign	Japanese date	Gregorian date	Mintage (Note: Mintages on the Japan Mint website are in thousands)
5th	五	1930 (Gold)	852,563 (Note: These coins were not in general use.)
23rd	二十三	1948	74,520,000
24th	二十四	1949 (Type 1)	179,692,000
24th	二十四	1949 (Type 2) (Note: Two coin designs were made in 1949, the second type resembles the current one in use today.)	111,896,000
25th	二十五	1950	181,824,000
26th	二十六	1951	197,980,000
27th	二十七	1952	55,000,000
28th	二十八	1953	45,000,000
32nd	三十二	1957	10,000,000
33rd	三十三	1958 (Old script)	50,000,000
34th	三十四	1959 (New script)	33,000,000
35th	三十五	1960	34,800,000
36th	三十六	1961	61,000,000
37th	三十七	1962	126,700,000
38th	三十八	1963	171,800,000
39th	三十九	1964	379,700,000
40th	四十	1965	384,200,000
41st	四十一	1966	163,100,000
42nd	四十二	1967	26,000,000
43rd	四十三	1968	114,000,000
44th	四十四	1969	240,000,000
45th	四十五	1970	340,000,000
46th	四十六	1971	362,050,000
47th	四十七	1972	562,950,000
48th	四十八	1973	745,000,000
49th	四十九	1974	950,000,000
50th	五十	1975	970,000,000
51st	五十一	1976	200,000,000
52nd	五十二	1977	340,000,000
53rd	五十三	1978	318,000,000
54th	五十四	1979	317,000,000
55th	五十五	1980	385,000,000
56th	五十六	1981	95,000,000
57th	五十七	1982	455,000,000
58th	五十八	1983	410,000,000
59th	五十九	1984	202,850,000
60th	六十	1985	153,150,000
61st	六十一	1986	113,960,000
62nd	六十二	1987	631,775,000
63rd	六十三	1988	396,120,000
64th	六十四	1989	67,332,000

=== Heisei ===
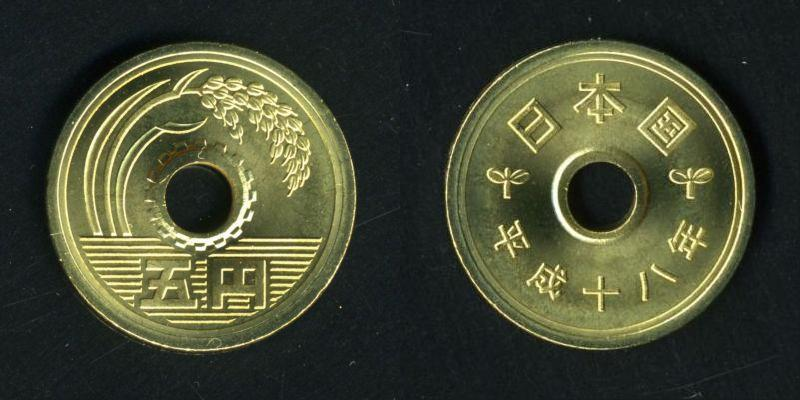
Heisei 5 yen coin from 2006 (year 18)

The following are circulation dates during the reign of Emperor Akihito (Heisei), who reigned from 1989 until his abdication in April 2019. The first year of his reign is marked with a 元 symbol on the coin as a one-year type. Coins for this period all begin with the kanji characters 平成 (Heisei). Five-yen coins dated between 2010 and 2013 were only released in mint sets.

- Japanese coins are read with a left to right format:

"Emperors name" → "Number representing year of reign" → "Year" (Ex: 平成 → 二十六 → 年).

Year of reign	Japanese date	Gregorian date	Mintage
1st	元	1989	960,660,000
2nd	二	1990	520,953,000
3rd	三	1991	517,120,000
4th	四	1992	301,130,000
5th	五	1993	413,240,000
6th	六	1994	197,767,000
7th	七	1995	351,874,000
8th	八	1996	207,213,000
9th	九	1997	239,086,000
10th	十	1998	172,612,000
11th	十一	1999	60,120,000
12th	十二	2000	9,030,000
13th	十三	2001	78,025,000
14th	十四	2002	143,662,000
15th	十五	2003	102,406,000
16th	十六	2004	70,903,000
17th	十七	2005	16,029,000
18th	十八	2006	9,594,000
19th	十九	2007	9,904,000
20th	二十	2008	9,811,000
21st	二十一	2009	4,003,000
22nd	二十二	2010	510,000 (Note: These coins were sold exclusively in mint and proof sets.)
23rd	二十三	2011	456,000
24th	二十四	2012	659,000
25th	二十五	2013	554,000
26th	二十六	2014	87,538,000
27th	二十七	2015	105,004,000
28th	二十八	2016	35,064,000
29th	二十九	2017	33,927,000
30th	三十	2018	17,960,000
31st	三十一	2019	16,946,000

=== Reiwa ===
The following are circulation dates in the reign of the current Emperor. Naruhito's accession to the Chrysanthemum Throne took place on May 1, 2019, and he was formally enthroned on October 22, 2019. Coins for this period all begin with the Japanese symbol 令和 (Reiwa). The inaugural year coin (2019) was marked 元 (first) and debuted during the summer of that year.

- Japanese coins are read with a left to right format:

"Emperors name" → "Number representing year of reign" → "Year" (Ex: 令和 → 二 → 年).

Year of reign	Japanese date	Gregorian date	Mintage
1st	元	2019	20,574,000
2nd	二	2020	29,528,000
3rd	三	2021	10,133,000
4th	四	2022	574,000
5th	五	2023	463,000
6th	六	2024	511,000
7th	七	2025	595,000
8th	八	2026	TBD
