= 100 yen coin =

Denomination of Japanese yen

One hundred yen
- Japan
- Value: 100 Japanese yen
- Mass: 4.8 g
- Diameter: 22.6 mm
- Edge: Plain
- Shape: Circular
- Composition: (1967–present) Cupro-nickel (Cu 75%, Ni 25%); (1957–1967) Silver alloy
- Years of minting: December 11, 1957–present

Obverse
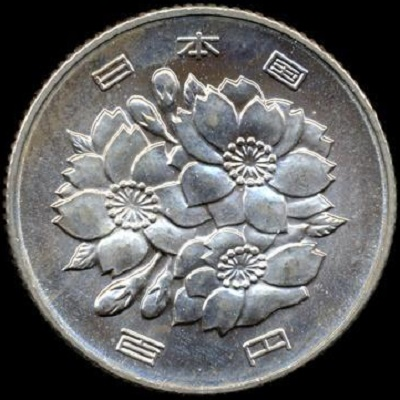
- Design: Cherry blossoms (sakura)
- Design date: February 1, 1967

Reverse
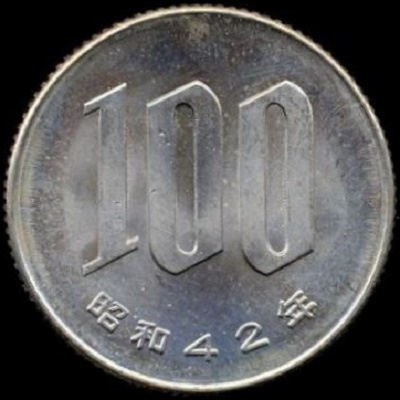
- Design: "100" in Arabic numerals
- Design date: February 1, 1967

The 100 yen coin (百円硬貨, Hyaku-en kōka) is a denomination of Japanese yen. These coins were first minted in 1957 using a silver alloy, before the current design was adopted with an alloy change in 1967. It is the second-highest denomination coin in Japan, after the 500 yen coin. The current 100 yen coin is one of two denominations that depict the emperor's rule date in Arabic numerals rather than kanji.

== History ==
=== Silver yen ===
100 yen coinage was first authorized in 1951 with the specification that the coins be made of a silver alloy. These were first minted for circulation in 1957 and feature a phoenix on the reverse. The alloy decided upon consisted of 60% silver, 30% copper, and 10% zinc and came at a time when banknotes of the same denomination were already in circulation. The "100 yen" bill hence became a substitute to the coin as the two were allowed to co-circulate. The design of the coin was later changed in 1959 which removed Latin script ("Yen") and changed the reverse side to show a sheaf of rice. To commemorate the summer 1964 Olympics in Tokyo 16 million ounces of silver was used to strike the 80,000,000 coins produced. None of these coins were recorded as ever going into circulation as they were grabbed and stored away as collector's items. Minting 100 yen coins was profitable up into the mid-1960s until the worldwide price for silver bullion began to rise. The Japanese government had planned on producing 800 million silver coins over a 10-year span, (Note: Post-1964) but the amount of silver held was insufficient. Silver was dropped from the coinage in 1967, which led to coin hoarding and silver smuggling outside of the country for melting.

=== Cupronickel yen ===
The current design of the 100 yen coin debuted in 1967, and features sakura blossoms and the denomination in Japanese. A new alloy of 75% copper and 25% nickel (cupronickel) was decided upon to replace the former silver alloy. It was reported that by 1969 the monetary value in the old silver coins was US$3 an ounce, prompting a "coin retirement" plan by the government. On August 1, 1974, 100-yen notes were withdrawn from circulation, but notes dated after World War II were allowed to retain their legal tender status. The amount of coins produced then decreased from the mid to late 1970s as a possible attempt to control economic inflation. The issuance of the new 100 yen coin has also been cited as a factor in the rapid spread of vending machines during this decade. By the late 1970s into the early 1980s a myth was established that tied the amount of coins produced with the growing popularity of the arcade game industry, particularly the 1978 game Space Invaders. While there were reports of Japanese cities briefly running out of 100 yen coins, arcade operators would have emptied out their machines and taken the money back to the bank, which kept the coins circulating.

Production of the 100 yen coin dropped going into the mid-1980s due to various proposed reasoning. Japan at the time had been in economic decline caused in part by trade tensions with other countries that were competing with Japanese exports. The Japanese government was trying to deflate the yen, and achieve more imports and less exports. Another explanation put forward is the introduction of the 500 yen coin in 1982. The Japanese mint at the time stated that a higher value coin was needed for use in vending machines. In any case mintage figures recovered towards the very end of Emperor Shōwa's reign. No coins were minted in 1989 (year 64) as molds needed to make coins for Akihito had already begun. Denominations of 1, 5, 10, and 500 yen were given priority over 50 and 100 yen coins. By the mid-1990s 100-yen shops were expanding into retail chains; these shops are akin to American dollar stores. Coin production remained unhindered during the early years of Akihito's reign until the millennium, when 500 yen coins were turned out in record numbers. The offset caused low mintage numbers which included only 8,024,000 pieces struck in 2001, a record low for the series. The 100 yen coin continues to be produced as the second-highest denomination of yen coinage.

== Designs ==
Image	Minted	Diameter	Weight	Composition	Design
	1957–1958	22.6 mm	4.8g	60% silver, 30% copper, 10% zinc	Phoenix
	1959–1966	22.6 mm	4.8g	60% silver, 30% copper, 10% zinc	Sheaf of rice
	1967–	22.6 mm	4.8g	75% copper, 25% nickel	Sakura

== Circulation figures ==
=== Shōwa ===
The following are circulation dates which cover Emperor Hirohito's reign. The dates below correspond with the 32nd to the 64th year (last) of his reign. One hundred yen coins had three main different designs, but there was no overlap in mintage between them. When these coins were first made they used Kanji script to represent the date. The current one-hundred yen coin dates to 1967 (year 42) when Arabic numerals were used to reflect the emperor's year of reign (date). Coins for this period will all begin with the Japanese symbol 昭和 (Shōwa).

- Japanese coins are read with a left to right format:

"Emperors name" → "Number representing year of reign" → "Year" (Ex: 昭和 → 53 → 年).

Year of reign	Japanese date	Gregorian date	Mintage (Note: Mintages on the Japan Mint website are in thousands)
32nd	三十二	1957	30,000,000
33rd	三十三	1958	70,000,000
34th	三十四	1959	110,000,000
35th	三十五	1960	50,000,000
36th	三十六	1961	15,000,000
38th	三十八	1963	45,000,000
39th	三十九	1964	10,000,000 (Note: These were not issued as commemorative coins, those made for the Olympics can be found in their own section.)
40th	四十	1965	62,500,000
41st	四十一	1966	97,500,000
42nd	N/A	1967	432,200,000
43rd	N/A	1968	471,000,000
44th	N/A	1969	323,700,000
45th	N/A	1970	237,100,000
46th	N/A	1971	481,050,000
47th	N/A	1972	468,950,000
48th	N/A	1973	680,000,000
49th	N/A	1974	660,000,000
50th	N/A	1975	437,160,000
51st	N/A	1976	322,840,000
52nd	N/A	1977	440,000,000
53rd	N/A	1978	292,000,000
54th	N/A	1979	382,000,000
55th	N/A	1980	588,000,000
56th	N/A	1981	348,000,000
57th	N/A	1982	110,000,000
58th	N/A	1983	50,000,000
59th	N/A	1984	41,850,000
60th	N/A	1985	58,150,000
61st	N/A	1986	99,960,000
62nd	N/A	1987	193,775,000
63rd	N/A	1988	363,112,000

=== Heisei ===
The following are circulation dates during the reign of Emperor Akihito. who was crowned in 1989. The dates below correspond with the 1st to the 31st year (last) of his reign. First year of reign coins are marked with a 元 symbol (first) as a one-year type. Coins for this period all use Arabic numerals for a date, and begin with the Japanese symbol 平成 (Heisei).

- Japanese coins are read with a left to right format:

"Emperors name" → "Number representing year of reign" → "Year" (Ex: 平成 → 16 → 年).

Year of reign	Gregorian date	Mintage
1st (元)	1989	369,000,000
2nd	1990	444,953,000
3rd	1991	375,120,000
4th	1992	211,130,000
5th	1993	82,240,000
6th	1994	81,767,000
7th	1995	92,874,000
8th	1996	237,213,000
9th	1997	272,086,000
10th	1998	252,612,000
11th	1999	179,120,000
12th	2000	172,026,000
13th	2001	8,024,000
14th	2002	10,667,000
15th	2003	98,406,000
16th	2004	204,903,000
17th	2005	300,029,000
18th	2006	216,594,000
19th	2007	129,904,000
20th	2008	93,811,000
21st	2009	115,003,000
22nd	2010	67,905,000
23rd	2011	178,936,000
24th	2012	402,211,000
25th	2013	608,892,000
26th	2014	445,013,000
27th	2015	410,004,000
28th	2016	461,064,000
29th	2017	518,927,000
30th	2018	567,960,000
31st	2019	302,006,000

=== Reiwa ===
The following are circulation dates in the reign of the current Emperor. Naruhito's accession to the Chrysanthemum Throne took place on May 1, 2019, and he was formally enthroned on October 22, 2019. Coins for this period all begin with the Japanese symbol 令和 (Reiwa). The inaugural year coin (2019) is marked 元 (first).

- Japanese coins are read with a left to right format:

"Emperors name" → "Number representing year of reign" → "Year" (Ex: 令和 → 3 → 年).

Year of reign	Gregorian date	Mintage
1st (元)	2019	58,614,000
2nd	2020	453,428,000
3rd	2021	366,133,000
4th	2022	293,274,000
5th	2023	192,927,000
6th	2024	163,827,000
7th	2025	104,071,000
8th	2026	TBD

== Commemoratives ==
Image	Japanese date	Gregorian date	Mintage	Reason
	39; Shōwa (Note: 39th year of Emperor Shōwa (Hirohito)'s reign, Emperor Heisei (Akihito) was not crowned emperor until 1989)	1964	80,000,000	1964 Summer Olympics
	45; Shōwa	1970	40,000,000	Expo 70 in Osaka
	47; Shōwa	1972	30,000,000	1972 Winter Olympics in Sapporo
	50; Shōwa	1975	120,000,000	Expo '75 in Okinawa
	51; Shōwa	1976	70,000,000	Golden Jubilee of Emperor Hirohito
	27; Heisei (Note: 27th year of Emperor Heisei (Akihito)'s reign)	2015	2,324,000 (Note: These coins came in a set of four featuring a different train on each obverse.)	50th Anniversary of the inauguration of the Tōkaidō Shinkansen train service.
	28; Heisei	2016	2,324,000	50th Anniversary of the inauguration of the Tōkaidō Shinkansen train service.
	30; Heisei	2018	Unknown	2020 Tokyo Summer Olympics (First Issue)
	30; Heisei	2018	Unknown	2020 Tokyo Summer Paralympics (First Issue)
	31; Heisei	2019	19,740,000 (Note: 5 different obverse designs were used (karate pictured here) that have an individual mintage of 3,948,000 each.)	2020 Tokyo Summer Olympics (Second Issue)
	31; Heisei	2019	3,948,000	2020 Tokyo Summer Paralympics (Second Issue)
	元 (1); Reiwa	2019	11,844,000 (Note: 3 coin set (archery pictured here) with 3,948,000 per coin)	2020 Tokyo Summer Olympics (Third Issue)
	元 (1); Reiwa	2019	7,896,000 (Note: 2 coin set (archery pictured here) with 3,948,000 per coin)	2020 Tokyo Summer Paralympics (Third Issue)
	2 Reiwa	2020	11,844,000 (Note: The 2020 Olympics fourth issue was a 4 coin set (Miraitowa pictured here), while the Paralympics features a 3 coin set (Someity pictured here).)	2020 Tokyo Summer Olympics (Fourth Issue)
	2 Reiwa	2020	7,896,000	2020 Tokyo Summer Paralympics (Fourth Issue)
