= 50 cents =

50 cents is a coinage value in many systems using decimal currencies.

Examples include:

- Australian fifty-cent coin
- 50-cent piece (Canadian coin)
- 50 euro cent coin
- Half dollar (United States coin)
- Half guilder coin (Netherlands)
- Hong Kong fifty-cent coin

== See also ==
- 50 Cent (disambiguation)
- Half dollar
