= A yen =

Military currency used after World War II

A yen (A円, A en)
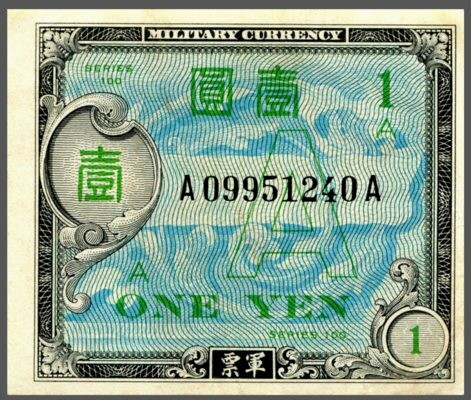
- Obverse of the 1 Yen A-Yen

Unit
- Unit: A yen
- Symbol: ¥

Denominations
- Banknotes: 10s, 50s, 1¥, 5¥, 10¥, 20¥, 100¥

Demographics
- User(s): United States Armed Forces, Korea

Issuance
- Central bank: • United States Civil Administration of the Ryukyu Islands • United States Army Military Government in Korea • Bank of Japan
- This infobox shows the latest status before this currency was rendered obsolete.

A yen (A圓, A en) was a colloquial term used to refer to a form of military scrip used in post-war US-occupied Japan, Korea, and Okinawa from September 7, 1945, to July 21, 1948. Unlike their B Yen counterparts, these notes were restricted to military use only with the exception of Korea for a brief time. They are notable for being the first "Military Payment Certificates" (in Korea) given after World War II had ended.

== History ==
Both "A" and "B yen" scrip in denominations from 10 sen to 100 yen were printed in 1945. These were to be used immediately upon the invasion of Okinawa, April 1, 1945. "A yen" scrip along with their "B yen" counterparts were initially presented in "SPECIMEN" booklets to help US Forces personnel identify the new invasion currency to be used.

In general, "A yen" scrip was printed using the block number "A-A" with exceptions. The block number "H-A" was used for specimen examples that found their way into circulation and for replacement notes. When the "A-yen" scrip was released in Japan, Korea, and the Ryukyu Islands from July 19, to September 30, 1946 it was restricted to military use only.

The United States military used these as payment certificates, while the civilian population used "B yen" scrip as currency. "A yen" scrip was used as general currency in Korea from September 7, 1945, to July 10, 1946. "A yen" scrip was eventually deprecated in all three regions on July 21, 1948, in favor of a one currency "B yen" scrip system.

== Production ==
All "A yen" series notes are considered scarcer than the "B yen" series, despite the former having millions more printed. Each note was printed under the A-A block expect for replacement notes which used block H-A.

Denomination	Amount printed	Ink color
10 sen	93,456,000	Purple
50 sen	76,668,000	Blue
1 yen	66,176,000	Green
5 yen	29,840,000	Blue
10 yen	51,880,000	Green
20 yen	4,506,000	Purple
100 yen	9,140,000	Blue

== Collecting ==
Every denomination of the Japanese "A-yen" series is considered to be "scarce" due to their lower survival rate than their "B-yen" counterparts. This was partly caused by the limited time the notes were allowed to circulate as civilian currency, and the limited time given to redeem them. The smaller denomination bills were more likely to have been kept as they were issued in greater numbers and had a lower value. High denomination bills of "20" and "100 yen" are rare as only a few of these notes were intentionally kept by civilians from redemption. These un-redeemed notes were invalidated afterwards which essentially made them worthless (at the time) to those keeping them.

The booklets of specimen currency that were used to instruct US Forces personnel identify the new invasion currency are also still extant. Each of these booklets originally contained a note from the 7 different denominations with replacement H-A serial numbers and "SPECIMEN" roulette cancels. A complete example with all 7 denominations in "Choice Crisp Uncirculated" condition sold for $1,300 (USD) at auction on June 26, 2019. Specimen notes that were removed from booklets and found their way into circulation are worth significantly more than their A-A block counterparts.

== See also ==
- Allied Military Currency
- Japanese invasion money
- Japanese military currency (1937–1945)
- Military payment certificate
