= Pavilion of Regalia, Royal Decorations and Coins =

Museum in Bangkok, Thailand

Coordinates: 13.751003°N 100.491782°E

The Pavilion of Regalia, Royal Decorations and Coins (Thai: ศาลาเครื่องราชอิสริยยศ เครื่องราชอิสริยาภรณ์ และเหรียญกษาปณ์, RTGS: Sala Khrueang Ratcha Isariyaphon Lae Rian Kasab) is a museum showcasing regalia, royal Thai decorations of the early period, historical Thai money and ornaments used in the royal courts. It is under the supervision of the Bureau of Grand National Treasure, the Treasury Department which has the responsibility to safeguard, conserve, and display national treasures.

The museum is inside the Royal Grand Palace, at the entrance to the Emerald Buddha Temple.

== History ==
In 1976, the museum was originally called "The Coins Pavilion" and was established by the Treasury Department to display the evolution of Thai coins. The museum was inaugurated on 14 April 1976, presided over by the king and queen, Princess Maha Chakri Sirindhorn and Princess Chulabhorn. In 1978, the Treasury Department expanded the scope of the collection to include royal regalia and decorations and was renamed "The Royal Regalia, Decorations and Coins Pavilion". The expanded collection was opened on 11 August 1978 and once again presided over by the king and queen, Princess Maha Chakri Sirindhorn, and Princess Chulabhorn.

In 1992, after almost two decades and over half a million visitors a year, the need to renovate the museum was apparent. A new interior, a new design, refurbished rooms, and more selective displays were required along with a need to focus on preservation as well as the security of the museum. Once renovations were completed a new name was chosen, "The Pavilion of Regalia, Royal Decorations and Coins".

In 2002, the restructuring of the Treasury Department created a new office, "The Bureau of Grand National Treasure". Its primary purpose is to conserve as well as display the items housed by the museum. Since the establishment of this new government department on 3 October 2002, museum has been managed by the Bureau of Grand National Treasure.

In 2012, the museum reopened after extensive renovation works including the installation of new interactive technology described as an "e-museum".

== Exhibition rooms ==
=== The history of the Pavilion of Regalia, Royal Decorations and Coins ===
This room displays the origin, history and establishment of the Pavilion of Regalia, Royal Decorations & Coins, and shows the items used when the King and Queen, Princess Maha Chakri Sirindhorn, and Princess Chulabhorn presided over the inauguration of “The Royal Regalia and Decorations Pavilion” in 1976 and 1978.

=== The Royal Regalia and the origin and history of Royal Thai Decorations ===
Regalia symbolize prestige and rank and were also rewards for good service. It was an ancient tradition where the King bestowed regalia on members of the royal family, courtiers and officials according to their rank and status. The room exhibits the various types of regalia, such as regalia for prosperity, headgear, attire, royal paraphernalia and weapons of rank. Their design and the metal used differs according to the rank of the recipient and the period in which they were made. The regalia on display includes regalia for prosperity, headgear, attires, weapon and royal paraphernalia set. Also on display are original Royal Thai decorations such as "The Dara Irapot" or the Three headed Elephant Star, which was created in 1857 during the reign of King Rama IV.

== Royal regalia used in royal ceremonies ==
=== The coronation ceremony ===
The coronation ceremony in Thailand is performed to honor the new king, and has been performed since the Sukhothai Kingdom (around the 13th to 15th centuries). This room displays the items used in the coronation ceremonies such as Chada Phra Kleeb (the crown with petal-shape top), gold plate featuring Rajasri and the gold tablet bearing the king's name and title.

=== The royal tonsure ceremony ===
The royal tonsure, or topknot-cutting ceremony is an ancient ritual that marks the coming of age for a royal child. The coming of age for a boy is around 11–13 years old, and for a girl it is when she is 11. The ceremony was last performed in the royal Thai court in 1928 during the reign of King Rama VII. This room displays the items used in the royal tonsure ceremony such as the chest piece decorations, the shoulder decorations, the gold chain decorated with diamond, rings, the nine gems ring, paddle-like implement, gold belt and buckle.

== The attire of the Emerald Buddha ==
The Emerald Buddha is an object of national veneration. The Buddha image was first found in 1464 and is carved from a large piece of jade. This display shows the new attires of the Emerald Buddha for the summer, rainy, and winter seasons which were created on the occasion of the 50th anniversary of the king's ascension to the throne. The king of the Chakri dynasty changes the attire of the Emerald Buddha at the beginning of each season with the following schedules:

1. Summer season attire: Changed on the first day of the waning of the fourth lunar moon, the month of March

2. Rainy season attire: Changed on the first day of the waning of the eighth lunar moon, the month of July

3. Cold season attire: Changed on the first day of the waning of the 12th lunar moon, the month of November

== "One Month and Cradle" ceremony ==
The royal ceremony for the celebration of royal children reaching the age of one month and the cradle ceremony is considered an important ancient royal function. The king performs the ceremony for all sons, daughters, nephews, and nieces when they reach the age of one month. The exhibit displays the royal cradle and items used in the ceremony which includes a photograph of a guardian angel, a grindstone, gold and silver coconuts, a bag of yellow beans, white sesame seeds and paddy rice, gold and silver prawns, and fish and a large bowl which contains holy water.

== Components of the royal regalia ==
This exhibit displays the royal regalia of Princess Maha Chakri Sirindhorn. The regalia includes a gold-enameled betel nut tray set, a gold–enameled betel nut case studded with diamonds, a gold face bathing bowl with pedestal tray, a gold-enameled drinking water bowl with a carved gold pedestal tray, and a gold cup, a gold cylindrical kettle, a gold tea set with jade cup and lid and a gold–enameled spittoon. The exhibit also displays the photographs of the regalia of Crown Prince Vajiralongkorn. He was bestowed with the Golden Tablet of Style and title, the royal seal, the royal decorations and royal regalia in accordance with ancient tradition.

== The evolution of Thai coins ==
This room exhibits money used in Thailand from the ancient time to the present. It starts with the round flat coins of Funan and Dvaravati Kingdoms which occupied areas which are now parts of Thailand. When Sukhothai Kingdom was founded in 1238, the money called Pod Duang or 'bullet money' was created. The money was mostly made of silver. It was round-shaped and rolled into inwardly curving legs with pointed ends. Pod Duang was used as currency of Thailand for more than 700 years before it was replaced by modern coins. The display also shows a large collection of coins produced during the Bangkok period. The highlight of which include "Royal Gift" coins which were minted from a small coin production machine sent to King Rama IV as a royal gift from Queen Victoria in 1857. Gold and silver coins commemorating the 60th birthday anniversary of King Rama IV which are known as tae meng coins and commemorative medals of the present reign are also on display.

== See also ==
- History of Thai money
