= History of Thai money =

The history of Thai money used as a medium of exchange and to settle accounts before the adoption of Thai baht coins and banknotes include novel designs and forms. For Thai people, money was considered as the symbol of civilization. Currency itself reflected faith in religion, culture, the customs and traditions of each era and also serve as a record of the development of Thailand.

== History ==
The land which is now Thailand was once inhabited by various pre-historic communities. These groups of people left a heritage of social culture and ceremonies.

In the ancient days of Thai society, before money was created to serve as a medium of exchange, humans traded goods by bartering for products of similar value. However, many products differed in quality, and buyers and sellers differed in their assessments of value and in their requirements. To facilitate product sales, several mutually-agreed commodities came into use as mediums for exchange.

The Indo-China Peninsula or "Suvarnabhumi" which means 'golden peninsula', was the geographical area on which Thailand is presently situated. These ancient kingdoms were a prosperous homeland for a variety of diverse races and tribes. They were the regions that were later on known as the Funan Kingdom, Dvaravati Kingdom, Srivijaya Kingdom, and Sukhothai Kingdom. They used money as a medium of exchange which evolved into different forms of money. Thai money has the unique characteristics of the Thai nation with the Sukhothai Kingdom, using round shaped money made from silver which was known as "pod duang", and has been continued from that time down to the Ayutthaya, Thonburi and the early Rattanakosin periods.

== Funan Kingdom (1st–6th centuries AD) ==
Funan was the most important region of Indo–China and became highly successful in trade during the 1st through 6th centuries. The Funan Kingdom was influenced by India, through trading and bartering→SOS. The coinage used during that period bears marks symbolizing the monarchy and the religion, these were mostly flat and round coins made from silver. These coins display, on one side, a half sun spreading rays between two rows of fish eggs. The opposite side carries, in a central position, the Sriwatsa design that represents Narayana in accordance with the Brahmin religion, with bandoh, a small Brahmin ceremonial drum, in one corner; and the swastika, a symbol that represents good luck, in the other. At the top of each coin the sign of the sun and the moon appear.

== Dvaravati Kingdom (6th–11th centuries) ==
With the decline of the Funan Kingdom, several kingdoms declared their freedom and independence. They alternated as dominant powers in the area. They included the regions around the central Chao Phraya River basin such as Nakhon Pathom, Rajburi, Supanburi. They had become the important cities and formed themselves into the consolidated kingdom known as the Kingdom of Dvaravati in the 6th century AD. They also alternated at being the dominant power in the area and continued to follow the religious beliefs and administrative systems that had been adopted from India. They were also influenced by Khmer culture and beliefs. The Dvaravati Kingdom produced many types of coins as mediums of trade. They revealed, through the designs on the coins, symbols of monarchy and the power of the state, the beliefs of Buddhism, and the Bhramin religion.

Samples are coins inscribed with the large conch, the small conch, the rabbit on a lily leaf, and the goat, with a row of fish eggs decorating the outer edge. On the reverse side is the Sriwatsa symbol flanked by ankusha, with the sun and moon on the top and fish at the bottom. In addition, there are flat coins on one side. On some of these coins appeared the features of Buranaklod (water jar), the Dhama wheel and a cow. On the reverse side of the coins is ancient Sanskrit script.

== Srivijaya Kingdom (8th–13th centuries) ==
Around the 8th century, the Srivijaya Kingdom was "the land of sea-faring traders". Therefore, the Malay Peninsula, especially the area of Chaiya and Nakhon Sri Thammaraj province prospered because they were vital ports on the trade route and also the central market of goods from Europe, the Middle East, India, and Cochin China (Vietnam). Merchant ships stopped to seek shelter from the southern monsoons of the Malaysian Peninsula. Eventually, these lands in the southern part down to Sumatra Island rose to power and banded together to form Srivijaya Kingdom. The people were Buddhists of the Mahayana sect, ruled by a king.

The two main types of money found originating from Srivijaya Kingdom were Dok Chan money and Namo money.

Silver and gold Dok Chan money is flat, round, and imprinted with a four-petal blossom on one side, with the other side imprinted with the ancient Sanskrit word wara.

Silver mixed with antimony Namo money is flat, round and small with one side bearing the ancient Sanskrit letter similar to Thai alphabet "น". On the other side, there are fold and gully marks.

== Sukhothai Kingdom (13th–15th centuries) ==
The Sukhothai Kingdom was founded after the joint efforts and armies of Poh Khun (King) Pah Muang and Poh Khun (King) Bang Klang Hao successfully dislodged the Khmer from holding on the administrative powers over the territories of Suvarnaphumi. Poh Khun Bang Klang Hao ascended the throne of the Sukhothai Kingdom under a new title and name: King Sri Intharathit.

The pinnacle of political and administrative power, and the development of the Sukhothai Kingdom, was reached during the reign of King Ramkhamhaeng. This kingdom's territory was extended to cover the entire length of the Malaysian Peninsula. The initiation of the Thai alphabet and its inscription into stone. Besides, the people of Sukhothai made ceramics which were considered to be of high quality and known as sangkalok. Sangkalok was an important component of exports.

The medium of exchange used in this kingdom varied, but the type of money originated in Sukhothai was "pod duang" or "bullet money". It was in circulation for 600 years. It was round-shaped, with long, sharp and pointed tips of legs, and a large hole between the legs. It had marks to show the origin, as few as one and as many as seven marks have been found stamped into Sukhothai pod duang. The marks most often found are lion, elephant, conch, Dharma Wheel, lotus, rabbit and ratchawat (a pyramid of dots).

Additionally, it was found that Sukhothai used a hard mixture of many low value metals, such as tin, lead and zinc, to produce a shape resembling pod duang, but of larger size, they were called different names, such as "pod duang chin", ngern kub, ngern khub, or ngern kook. Cowrie shells or bia were also used as small change in the Sukhothai Kingdom.

== Ayutthaya Kingdom (1351–1767) ==
The establishment of the Kingdom of Ayutthaya was in 1351 A.D. Due to the geographical location with the junction of four main rivers, namely, Chao Phraya, Noi, Lop Buri, and Pa Sak, Ayutthaya had become then the centre of commerce, communication, economics and administration.

The main Ayutthaya money remained pod duang as in the Sukhothai period, but with some modifications. The coins later became more compact, with shorter and wider apart legs, and with smaller and less deep notch marks. They also made the rice grains pattern instead. Pod Duang of the period bore only two marks. On the top was the chakra, which was the kingdom mark, and in the front was the reign marks, which varied in design, such as the Pum Khao Bin, Ratchawat, Elephant and Conch Shell marks.

== Thonburi Kingdom (1767–1782) ==
After the fall of Ayudhya to the Burmese in 1767, King Taksin led the Thai army to push out and vanquish the Burmese. After liberation, King Taksin tried to put the country back in order, as Ayudhya had been sacked and burnt by the Burmese and was difficult to renovate in a short time. Therefore, King Taksin chose to establish his capital in Thonburi. Thonburi was close to the sea and suitable as a seaport for trading with foreign countries. It was a small city that was easy to take care of and defend. Later, he was enthroned as the king and the people passed a resolution to honor him as “King Taksin the Great”

The money that was used early in this reign was pod duang of Ayudhya and later King Taksin had pod duang produced for use in the economic system with similar characteristics as that of the later Ayudhya period but was stamped with the Chakra as the Kingdom mark. Regarding the Reign mark, it still remained controversial as to what symbol was used: "Trisula" or "Thavivudh".

== Rattanakosin Kingdom ==
Following the Thonburi Kingdom, Rattanakosin was established as the new capital. The monetary system at the beginning of Rattanakosin Era was similar to Ayudhya monetary system consisting of pod duang but it was modified in order to exhibit the development of unique traits attributed to Thai people living in this era. Commemorating pod duang also came into being, which showed there was a shared interest in the importance of the events occurring in their time. Then, King Rama IV who had the royal intention to produce "flat coinage" for use. For the first time this became a period in which Thai money entered the international system.

== Reign of King Rama I to King Rama III ==
In the reign of King Rama I until King Rama III, pod duang was continued in use but with the reign mark changed. King Phra Phutthayotfa Chulalok the Great (King Rama I) created pod duang with the Chakra representing the kingdom mark and the Bua Unalom and the royal emblem of King Rama I. The pod duang also had values: tamlueng, baht, half baht, salueng, fueang.

The money used in the reign of King Rama II continued to be pod duang which was similar to that of King Rama I's, but with the reign mark changed to the Garuda to represent the reign of King Rama II. It is assumed to have come from his former name "Chim Plee", the paradise home of Lord Garuda.

The money produced in the reign of King Rama III remained the pod duang carrying the Chakra-Prasat mark. The Prasat mark represents King Rama III's former name: "Tab" (Tee pratab), which was Phra Maha Prasat (royal palace). Additionally, it was found that pod duang was produced to commemorate some important occasions such as pod duang krut sio, pod duang chaleo, pod duang dok mai, and pod duang bai matum.

== Reign of King Rama IV ==
The Thai monetary system changed significantly during the reign of King Rama IV. This period saw increasing trade between Thai and foreigners. During the early period of the reign, pod duang was still the main money, bearing the chakra as the kingdom mark and the Mongkut as the reign mark. The use of the Mongkut mark (crown) was the pre-ascension of his title and name "Crown Prince Mongkut".

Meantime, Thailand had a problem due to the inability of being able to produce sufficient pod duang and to meet demand as well as prevent widespread counterfeiting, King Rama IV had the paper money issued for use along with pod duang, being called "mai". Mai was produced from paper with simple printing and used together with pod duang, but this series of paper money was not popular with citizens.

In 1857, Queen Victoria sent a small manually-powered coin production machine as a royal gift. King Rama IV had the first coin production machine. This coin was called "Rien Bannakarn" (royal gift coins). But, finally, the cessation of use of this machine was ordered because only a small number of coins could be produced per day. They had a new steam-powered machine for the production of flat coinage. Later, King Rama IV ordered the construction of the Sitthikarn Mint in front of the Royal Treasury in the Grand Palace. The first series of coins produced by this machine was similar to the royal gift coins. They could be used alongside pod duang, as the production of pod duang had been discontinued.

In this same year King Rama IV ordered the production of gold and silver coins of four baht value bearing the Monkut-Krung Siam mark as mementos of his 60th birthday.

== Reign of King Rama V ==
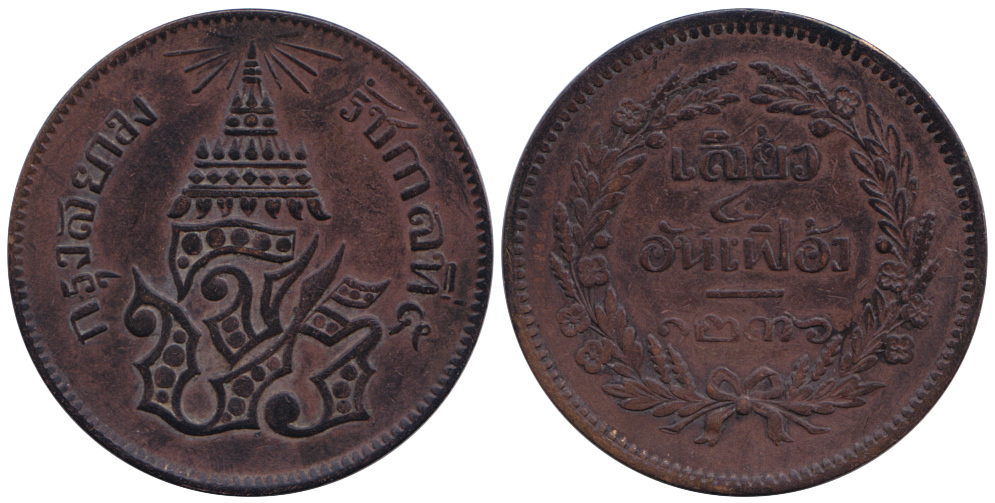
A copper coin of 1 Sio or 2 Atta, struck at the Birmingham Mint in 1874 for Siam. The obverse bears the name of King Rama V (รัชกาลที่ ๕).

The reign of King Rama V saw a significant development of the nation in almost every aspect including in monetary and financial system. In 1875, the king ordered a new mint built, including installation of a new machine with greater production capacity and efficiency. The new mint began producing silver coins with the royal portrait and the coat-of-arms design, the first time that the front side carried the profile of the ruling monarch. It became the operating format for later reigns. The king ordered the issuance of new tin Solos coins bearing on the obverse the Phra Kiew (the coronet), and in the reverse, the Elephant inside Chakra design. The Phra Kiew is also called "Chula Mongkut" as the royal emblem of King Rama V.

During his reign, his younger brother Prince Jayanta Mongkol was tasked with restructuring of the monetary system to realign Siam's monetary units along international lines, from the former 13 units, — Tos, Pit, Pad Duang, Chang, Tumlung, Baht, Salung, Fuang, Pai, Sik, Sio, Att and Solos. These had been based upon weight and made keeping accounts internationally difficult.

Pod Duang production had ceased in the reign of King Rama IV. King Rama V ordered the production of pod duang with the Chakra Phra Kiew mark as a memento in commemoration of the royal cremation of his youngest daughter, Princess Charoen Kamol Suksawat, and as a memento of the royal merit making ceremony dedicated to Somdej Phra Thep Sirin Tara Mataya, the princess mother.

Gold standard has been unofficial applied in 1902 in response to the depreciation of silver in comparison of gold and the introduction of paper currency after approving Paper Currency Act of RS121 (1902) which established Paper Currency Department as the office within Ministry of Finance before Siamese Tical has become officially gold standard by the Gold Standard Act of RS127 (1908)

Rama V later ordered coins from the Paris Mint production facility, coins bearing the royal portrait engraved by Henri-Auguste Patey, and Airapo, the three-headed white elephant. Rama V however died before an announcement for use could be made, so Rama VI ordered distribution of the coins during the cremation of his father. These coins are generally called Rien Nuad' or "moustache coins".

== Reigns of King Rama VI to VIII ==
During the reigns of King Rama VI to VIII, Siam faced economic crises due to the worldwide economic downturn caused by world wars and depressions.

During the early reign of King Rama VI, coins that had been produced during the reign of King Rama V continued to circulate. Rama VI ordered for the first time the production of baht coins with the portrait of the king on the obverse, with these first coins having on the reverse Airavata, the three-headed white elephant.

Rama VI inaugurated the Thai Banknotes Department under the Ministry of Finance with the Siamese Currency Notes Act, R.E. 121, promulgated on 24 June 1902. Banknote Series 1 were printed by Thomas De La Rue & Company Limited, England, with the company name centered on the bottom margin. The notes were printed on one side only and in many types of seven denominations of 1 baht, 5 baht, 10 baht, 20 baht, 50 baht (Overprinted on 1 baht Banknotes Series 50Z-59Z), 100 baht and 1000 ticals[sic] with both Arabic and Thai numerals. (Dual numeration continues, but tical was dropped from Series 2 on.)

Series 2 banknotes were first issued in 1925 during the reign of Rama VI and continuing into the reign of Rama VII dropped translation of baht and first added the legend,

สัญญาจะจ่ายเงินให้แก่ผู้นำบัตรนี้มาขึ้นเป็นเงินตราสยาม Promise to pay (silver to) bearer on demand in (silver) currency of Siam;

later changed in 1928 to be in line with The Currency Act, B.E. 2471 to

ธนบัตรเป็นเงินที่ชำระหนี้ได้ตามกฎหมาย This note is legal tender (lit. silver in payment of debt) according to law.

The front has a guilloche design with twelve rays, and the back, depictions of the Royal Ploughing Ceremony, printed in six denominations: 1, 5, 10, 20, 100 and 1000 baht in two types printed by De La Rue.

Series 3 banknotes, first issued in 1934, were the first having a portrait of the king, appearing on the front with scenic designs as minor elements. The reverse depicts Phra Samut Chedi Temple with a statement of the penalty for counterfeit, also used for the first time. Series 3 continued until the reign of Rama VIII, printed by De La Rue in four denominations including 1, 5, 10 and 20 baht with the change of the royal portrait from King Rama VII to King Rama VIII in 1936.

Series 4 banknotes were first issued in 1938 by De La Rue with five denominations including 1–5–10–20 and 1,000 baht. The second type has been issued in 1940 with the change from รัฐบาลสยาม (Government of Siam) to รัฐบาลไทย (Government of Thailand) due to the change of country name on 10 December 1939 which applied to four denominations including 1–5–10 and 1,000 baht.

To alleviate a scarcity of banknotes in the country during the Greater East Asia War, the Royal Thai Survey Department printed a special series of banknotes in four denominations, 1–10–20 and 100, like those of the 4th series. The phrase "the Royal Thai Survey" at the lower center of the front and back replaced that of Thomas De La Rue & Co., London.

Series 5 were printed by the Note Printing Works of Japan in seven denominations including 50 satang, 1 baht, 5 baht, 10 baht, 20 baht, 100 baht and 1000 baht starting in 1942.

Series 6 were by the Royal Thai Survey Department and the Naval Hydrographic Department in two denominations including 20 and 100 baht, each with two types.

A special war-time issue was printed in England, Indonesia, and by the Royal Thai Survey Department in four denominations including 50 satang (over-stamped on 10 baht banknotes printed from Java), 1 baht (both from Royal Thai Survey Department and invasion notes issued in England), 50 baht (overprinted on the 1 Strait dollar notes issued for four Malayu States by Royal Thai Survey Department) and 1000 baht issued by Royal Thai Survey Department.

Series 7 was printed in haste by private printing companies under supervision from Bank of Thailand of barely satisfactory quality in four denominations including 1 baht, 5 baht, 10 baht and 50 baht

== Reign of King Rama IX ==
In 1945, the government sought to renew its contract with Thomas De La Rue & Company Limited, England, but the company had been damaged during the war and was unable to accept orders. The US government was asked for assistance. The US assigned its Bureau of Engraving and Printing to prepare the printing plates and the Tudor Press Company to do the printing of the 8th series. The front portrayed King Rama VIII at a young age as main element, and the Phra Pathom Chedi as a minor element on every denomination. On the back of all five denominations was the constitution placed on a pedestal tray. The dimensions of low and middle denominations including 1 baht, 5 baht, and 10 baht were the same as the low denominations of MPCs while the dimensions of high denominations including 20 baht and 100 baht were the same dimensions as a US dollar (high denomination of MPC). These were issued in 1946 during the reign of King Rama IX. They had been ordered in the period of the King Rama VIII but had been shifted as Rama IX had already ascended the throne.

Series 9 printed by De La Rue in six denominations returned to the familiar colors of each type and denomination model from Series 4 of De La Rue and Series 4 of Royal Thai Survey with the exception of 100 baht which used red instead of the azure color from Series 4 of Royal Thai Survey, and it can be assumed that the colors of the 9th Series are the standard for current Thai banknotes.

The 100 baht banknotes of Series 9 were heavily counterfeited, so the multi-colored banknotes with the base color of red were needed. Series 10 consisted of only the 100 baht denomination printed by De La Rue, first issued in 1968.

Series 11 began with 5 and 10 baht notes issued in 1969, 20 baht notes in 1971, and 100 baht notes in 1972. Five hundred baht banknotes were printed for the first time in 1975 when the production process, designing, engraving, and issuance of notes, shifted to Thailand's own note printing works.

King Bhumibol Adulyadej ascended the throne on 9 June 1946. He ruled until his death on 13 October 2016, the longest reign of any Thai monarch. His era was one when society and the economy rapidly changed, accompanied by evolution of knowledge and technology in all areas, including that of coins, which have continuously been developed and modified in design and metal content in order to comply with the rapidly expanding economy, and to meet international standards.

In 1950, the first series of circulation coins was minted in aluminum bronze and copper in four denominations; 5, 10, 25 and 50 satang coins with the obverse design being King Bhumibol's portrait and the reverse design being the coat of arms that had been used during the reign of King Rama V.

In 1986, the changes had been generally partial and made on certain values of coins only, following a comprehensive major revision of coin production in denomination, composition, size, and pattern, they included and addition of 1 satang and 10 baht coins. The government then produced a series of eight coins: 10 baht, 5 baht, 1 baht, 50 satang, 25 satang, 10 satang, 5 satang, and 1 satang. In 2005, 2 baht coins were minted and made raised the number of circulation coin to 9 denominations. Only 25 satang up to 10 baht are used in circulation while the 1, 5 and 10 batang are minted to serve the accounting system.

During this reign, a large number of coins were issued. The first commemorative coin was minted in 1961 with the nickel 1 baht coin to mark the return of the king and queen from state visits abroad. It is the first coin featuring the portrait of a female royal family member.

Banknote Series 12 was The Great Series in denominations of 10 baht notes in 1980 until the termination of 10 baht banknote issuing after 1995 to be replaced by 10 baht coins which has been issued since 1988, 20 baht notes in 1981 and 100 baht notes in 1978 with engravings of monuments for those monarchs entitled "The Great"."

In 1982, the first proof coin was minted to commemorate the bicentenary of Bangkok. The coins were presented to the king and royal family without being issued to the general public. It was not until Queen Sirikit's 50th anniversary on the 12 August 1982 that proof coins were released to the public.

Banknote Series 13 was to supposed issued to commemorate the Bicentennial Celebration of Bangkok in 1982, but a delay in the delivery of new printing machines along with heavy workload of the bank delayed the issuance of 50 baht notes until 1985, 500 baht notes in 1987 with engravings of monuments for the monarchs relating to Rattanakosin Celebration including King Prajadhipok and King Rama I."

The growing economy of Thailand caused demand for higher denominations. This caused the revival of 1000 baht notes in 1992 as a part of Series 14 banknotes along with the new notes in 100 baht denomination issued in 1994 and the new notes in 500 baht denomination issued in 1996."

== 21st century ==
Demands for anti-counterfeiting technology, along with the aim of the Thai government to draw public attention to the deeds of the monarchs of the Chakri Dynasty compelled the Bank of Thailand to issue the Series 15 Banknotes in five denominations: 20 baht in 2003, 50 baht in polymer sheets in 1997 before being replaced by the familiar paper notes (type 2) in 2004 due to the unpopularity of polymer notes, 100 baht in 2004 until the replacement with type 2 in 2005, 500 baht in 2001, and 1000 baht in 1999 until the replacement with type 2 in 2005."

- 2006: To celebrate the 60th year of the king's accession to the throne, the Treasury Department issued colored coins for the first time to mark "The First UNDP Human Development Lifetime Achievement Award" presented to the king by the United Nations. Apart from commemorative coins minted to mark special events and occasions, the Treasury Department also produces commemorative coins in cooperation with international organizations.
- 2012: Series 16 banknotes issued to glorify Thai kings of different periods from past to present
- 50 baht issued to commemorate the declaration of independence of King Naresuan.
- 2013: 20 baht Series 16 issued to commemorate King Ramkhamhaeng.
- 500 baht Series 16 issued to commemorate King Rama I.
- 100 baht Series 16 issued to commemorate King Taksin.
- 1000 baht Series 16 issued to commemorate King Chulalongkorn.
- 20, 50, 100 baht Series 17 to honour King Maha Vajiralongkorn Bodindradebayavarangkun

Thai money and coins are regarded as national treasures as they reflect not only Thai history, but also the Thai culture and economy of each period.

== Historical buying power of coin denominations throughout history ==
Coin Image	Denomination	1900 Baht	1925 Baht	1945 Baht	1965 Baht	1995 Baht	2000 Baht	2024 Baht
	1 Bia	1/6400 Baht	0.0002	0.0007	0.0491	0.3138	0.4090	0.6677
	1 Solot	1/128 Baht	0.0117	0.0367	2.45	15.69	20.45	33.39
	1 At	1/64 Baht	0.0234	0.0735	4.91	31.38	40.90	66.77
	1 Siao	1/32 Baht	0.0467	0.1469	9.82	62.77	81.80	133.55
	1 Sik	1/16 Baht	0.0935	0.2938	19.63	125.53	163.60	267.09
	1 Feuang	1/8 Baht	0.1870	0.5876	39.26	251.07	327.19	534.19
	1 Saleung	1/4 Baht	0.3739	1.1752	78.53	502.14	654.38	1,068.38
	2 Saleung	1/2 Baht	0.7479	2.3504	157.05	1,004.27	1,308.76	2,136.75
	1 Baht	1 Baht	1.50	4.70	314.10	2,008.55	2,617.52	4,273.50
	2 Baht	2 Baht	2.99	9.40	628.21	4,017.09	5,235.04	8,547.01
	2 1/2 Baht	2 1/2 Baht	3.74	11.75	785.26	5,021.37	6,543.80	10,683.76
	1 Tamleung	4 Baht	5.98	18.80	1,256.41	8,034.19	10,470.09	17,094.02
	2 Tamleung	8 Baht	11.97	37.61	2,512.82	16,068.38	20,940.17	34,188.03
	4 Tamleung	16 Baht	23.93	75.21	5,025.64	32,136.75	41,880.34	68,376.07
	8 Tamleung	32 Baht	47.86	150.43	10,051.28	64,273.50	83,760.68	136,752.14
	Half Chang	40 Baht	59.83	188.03	12,564.10	80,341.88	104,700.85	170,940.17
	Chang	80 Baht	119.66	376.07	25,128.21	160,683.76	209,401.71	341,880.34
	Hab	6400 Baht	9,572.65	30,085.47	2,010,256.41	12,854,700.85	16,752,136.75	27,350,427.35

== Historical buying power of the Baht throughout history ==
The value of the baht (bimetallic standard) has fluctuated over the years, and the baht inflated massively after switching to a fiat standard. This can be seen in the price of a bowl of Guay Jap (a type of noodle). One bowl of guay jap was around 1 att during the reign of Rama V, but during the era of Rama VI it cost around 1 satang. The decimal equivalent of 1 att was around 1.5 satang. As of 2024, the baht had depreciated since the reign of Rama V by a factor of around 500,000%. Note that the 500,000% inflation is a linear and static decrease in value, it is just a comparative percentage of how much the value had "decreased". It is not a yearly compounded value.

=== Goods and Services ===
1900 Baht	1920 Baht	1925 Baht	1945 Baht	1965 Baht	1995 Baht	2000 Baht	2024 Baht	Buying power
1 Att	^{1}/_{64} baht 1.56 satang	0.0233	0.0733	4.9000	31.3333	40.8333	66.6667	1 bowl of Guay Jap Noodles, or 1 plate of curry and rice, or 1 bottle of soda
1 Att + 1 Solot	^{3}/_{128} baht 2.34 satang	0.0350	0.1100	7.35	47.00	61.25	100.00	1 bowl of "good" noodles
1 Phai	^{1}/_{32} baht 3.125 satang	0.0467	0.1469	9.82	62.77	81.80	133.55	1 bottle of lemonade
1 Phai + 1 Att	^{3}/_{64} baht 4.68 satang	0.0700	0.2200	14.70	94.00	122.50	200.00	10 to 20 rolls of cigarettes, depending on the brand
3 Phai + 1 Solot	7/_{64} baht 10 satang	0.1496	0.4701	31.41	200.85	261.75	427.35	1 bowl of Oyster Porridge
1 Saleung	^{1}/_{4} baht 25 satang	0.3739	1.1752	78.53	502.14	654.38	1,068.38	1 pair of school shirts
2 Saleung	^{1}/_{2} baht 50 satang	0.7479	2.3504	157.05	1,004.27	1,308.76	2,136.75	1 time with a prostitute at Bang Khaek Road
2 Saleung + 1 Feuang	^{5}/_{8} baht 62.5 satang	0.9348	2.9380	196.31	1,255.34	1,635.95	2,670.94	1 pair of school trousers
3 Saleung	^{3}/_{4} baht 75 satang	1.12	3.53	235.58	1,506.41	1,963.14	3,205.13	1 pair of "good" Japanese shoes
1 Tamleng	4 baht 400 satang	5.98	18.80	1,256.41	8,034.19	10,470.09	17,094.02	1 bottle of "western" liquor
2 Tamleng	8 baht 800 satang	11.97	37.61	2,512.82	16,068.38	20,940.17	34,188.03	10 Rai of land "outside the city wall"
4 Tamleung + 2 Baht	10 baht 1000 satang	14.96	47.01	3,141.03	20,085.47	26,175.21	42,735.04	1 big teak wood house
5 Tamleung	20 baht 2000 satang	29.91	94.02	6,282.05	40,170.94	52,350.43	85,470.09	1 barrel of "bad" rice
10 Tamleung	40 baht 4000 satang	59.83	188.03	12,564.10	80,341.88	104,700.85	170,940.17	1 barrel of "good" rice

=== Salaries ===
In these examples, salaries from pre-1900 are calculated according to inflation to demonstrate salaries throughout the ages. These salaries are wage paied per month.

1800s	1900	1920	1945	1965	1995	2000	2024	Actual 2024 Salaries	Occupation
12			38.4	2,566	16,407	21,382	34,909	9000~15,000	Military Sergeant based on salaries of Chao Phraya Woraphongpipat in 1877
		2200	7040	470,400	3,008,000	3,920,000	6,400,000	amount unknown position renamed Royal secretary of the palace* 114,640 deputy Royal secretary of the palace*	Minister of the Palace Ministry based on salaries of Chao Phraya Woraphongpipat in 1926
16			51.2	3,421	21,876	28,509	46,545	15,400~34,000	Inexperienced Teacher based on salaries of Chao Phraya Yommarat (Pan Sukhum) in 1883
	20		64	4,276	27,345	35,636	58,182	position abolished 30,000~40,000 equating this position to a strings player in the Thailand Philharmonic Orchestra*	New Royal Musician based on the account of Mr.Som based on the account of Phra Pleng Por Hoo, a xylophone player
		220	704	47,040	300,800	392,000	640,000	position abolished	Experienced Royal Musician (12 years) based on the account of Phra Pleng Por Hoo
	40		128	8,553	54,691	71,273	116,364	15,000~25,000 equating this position to a TA	Textbook Author Assistant based of a Mr.Kham's account
48			153	10,223	65,373	85,193	139,091	24,000~69,000	Experienced Teacher based on salaries of Chao Phraya Yommarat (Pan Sukhum)
60			192	12,829	82,036	106,909	174,545	24,000~69,000	Experienced Teacher based on salaries of Phraya Sri Sunthorn Wohan in 1873 (the writer of Mulabhat Bhanphakit textbook)
	65		208	13,898	88,873	115,818	189,091	15,400~34,000	New Teacher based on an account of Phraya Boriharn Ratchamanop
	100		320	21,382	136,727	178,182	290,909	24,000~69,000	Experienced Teacher (8 years) based on an account of Phraya Boriharn Ratchamanop
		600	1920	128,291	820,364	1,069,091	1,745,455	position abolished	Royal Teacher based on an account of Phraya Boriharn Ratchamanop
50			160	10,691	68,364	89,091	145,455	27,000~45,000	Interpreter based on the account of Phraya Athikorn Prakasat (Louie Chatikawanich)
100			320	21,382	136,727	178,182	290,909	3070~21,980 Officer*	Police Officer based on the account of Phraya Athikorn Prakasat (Louie Chatikawanich)
	400		1280	85,527	546,909	712,727	1,163,636	14,030- 54,820 Sergeant*	Police Division Commander based on the account of Phraya Athikorn Prakasat (Louie Chatikawanich)
	500		1600	106,909	683,636	890,909	1,454,545	29,980~76,800 Commander*	Special Police Division Commander based on the account of Phraya Athikorn Prakasat (Louie Chatikawanich)
		700	2240	149,673	957,091	1,247,273	2,036,364	39,090~76,800 Assistant Commissioner* responsible to individual police departments**	Commander of the Bangkok Metropolitan Police based on the account of Phraya Athikorn Prakasat (Louie Chatikawanich)
		900	2880	192,436	1,230,545	1,603,636	2,618,182	39,090~76,800 Inspector General* responsible to all metropolitan and provincial police departments**	Director-General of the Provincial Police based on the account of Phraya Athikorn Prakasat (Louie Chatikawanich)
		1100	3520	235,200	1,504,000	1,960,000	3,200,000	78,030 Commissioner*	Chief of Police based on the account of Phraya Athikorn Prakasat (Louie Chatikawanich)
12500			40,000	2,672,727	17,090,909	22,272,727	36,363,636	76,800	Governor of Chiang Mai based on accounts by Lanna literature
5000			16,000	1,069,091	6,836,364	8,909,091	14,545,455	76,800	Governor of Lampang based on accounts by Lanna literature
3600			11,520	769,745	4,922,182	6,414,545	10,472,727	76,800	Governor of Nan based on accounts by Lanna literature
3500			11,200	748,364	4,785,455	6,236,364	10,181,818	76,800	Governor of Lamphun based on accounts by Lanna literature
		1600	5120	342,109	2,187,636	2,850,909	4,654,545	76,800	Governor of Roi Et based on accounts by a document listing civil servant's salaries in 1926

salaries are shown in baht*

calculation are done based on the assumption that inflation before 1920 is nil, hence making this chart an approximation**

=== Remarks ===
1. Does not represent regional/market pricing variations, only the average price.
2. Does not represent minor fluctuations of price over history, merely representing inflation trends.

=== Buying power discrepancy ===
This refers to the buying power of banknotes based relatively upon a certain commodity, be it: gold, noodles, etc. Basing the "discrepancy" on the lowest circulating denomination coins and banknotes, which demonstrates a relative buying power of a certain currency. It can be understood as, how much could a certain denomination buy a certain commodity, or the percentage in which the price of the commodity makes up the denomination.

Discrepancy relative to noodle prices*
Price	1 att	1.56 satang	5 satang	3 baht	5 baht	20 baht	78 baht
Lowest Denomination	1900	1920	1945	1967	1992	2003	2024
Coin	1 solot	1 satang	0.5 satang	5 satang	25 satang	25 satang	25 satang
Percentage Discrepancy	50%	150%	1000%	6000%	2000%	8000%	31 200%
Banknotes	1 baht	1 baht	50 satang	5 baht	10 baht	20 baht	20 baht
Percentage Discrepancy	0.01%	0.01%	10%	60%	50%	100%	390%

The illusion that "1 baht" could buy "a lot" back in the 1900s - 1950s come from the buying power of the lowest denomination. The discrepancy between the views and perspective come from the generation which grew up during those era and the generation far removed. Consider the 1 baht banknote in the 1900s, and the 1 baht coin in the 2020s. Their buying power are so different, it creates a rift in one's perception in a certain denomination when "one baht could buy you a bowl of noodle back then" is told to the later generations. When in reality, 1 baht banknote's buying power is closer to the 2024's 1000 baht banknote. Which calls into question, the over-buying-power of the 1910's 1000 baht banknote, which is akin to a 5 000 000 baht banknote in 2024 baht. In the end, value stays the same, only the number changes.

==== Remarks ====
1. Does not represent regional/market pricing variations, only the average price
