= Allied Military Currency =

World War II Allied powers currency

Allied Military Currency (AMC) was a form of currency issued by the Allied powers during World War II, to be issued to troops entering liberated or newly occupied countries, as a form of currency control.

== Background ==
Historically, soldiers serving overseas had been paid in local currency rather than in their "home" currency. Most cash drawn by soldiers would go directly into the local economy, and in a damaged economy the effects of a hard currency such as the dollar circulating freely alongside weaker local currencies could be very problematic, risking severe inflation.

There were other problems as well. Once dollars were circulating in a combat region, the opposing side could freely use its own stocks of dollars as currency, or acquire stocks for use elsewhere. The high purchasing power of the dollar, and its easy transference back to the United States, also posed a significant incentive to black-marketeering.

However, whilst the use of local currencies was effective where they were provided in cooperation with the local authorities, it was impractical in combat zones where the government might be hostile, deliberately ambivalent, or simply non-existent. In these cases, the military authorities issued special "military currency", which was paid out to soldiers at a fixed rate of exchange and simply declared legal tender in occupied areas by local commanders.

== Implementation ==
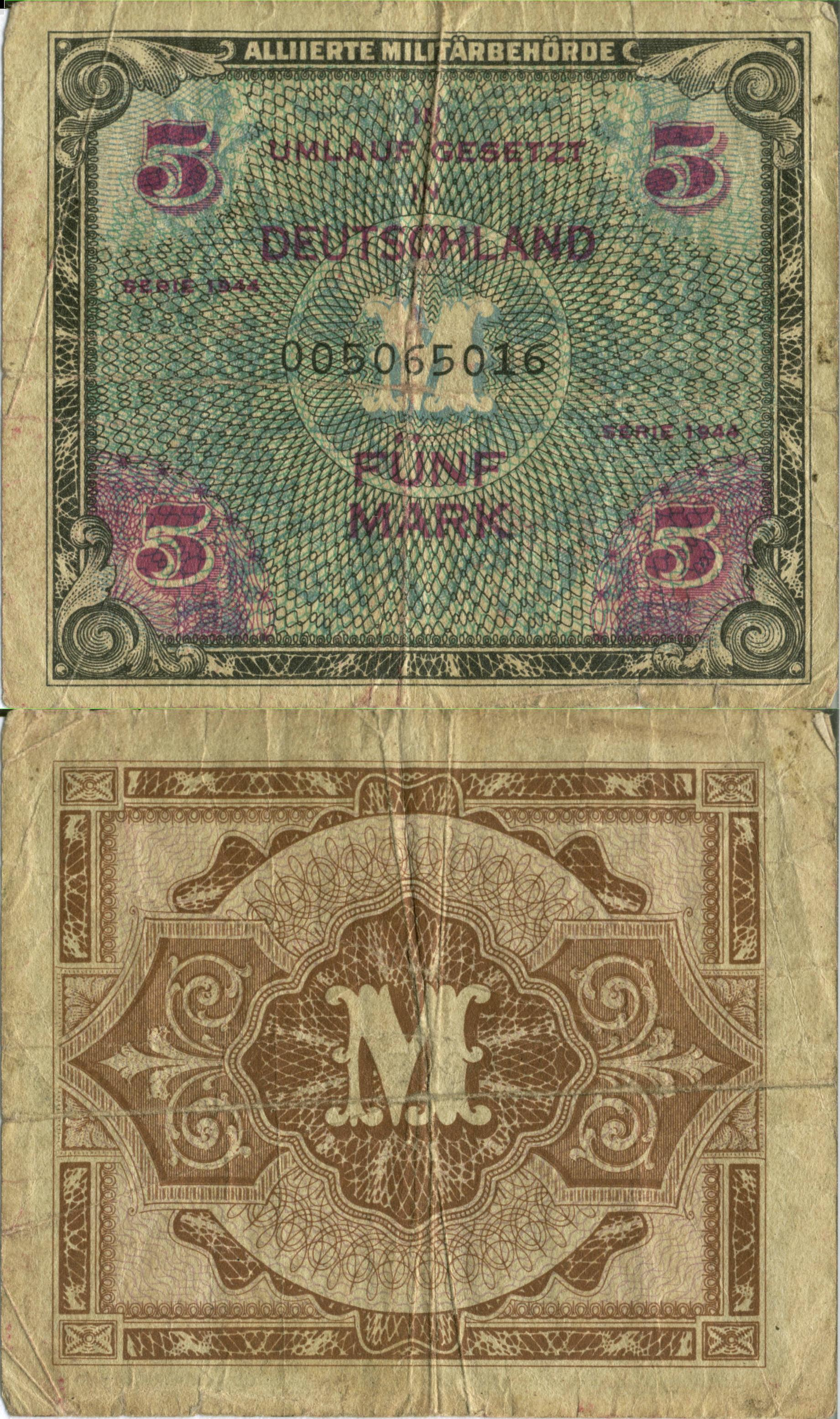
Germany

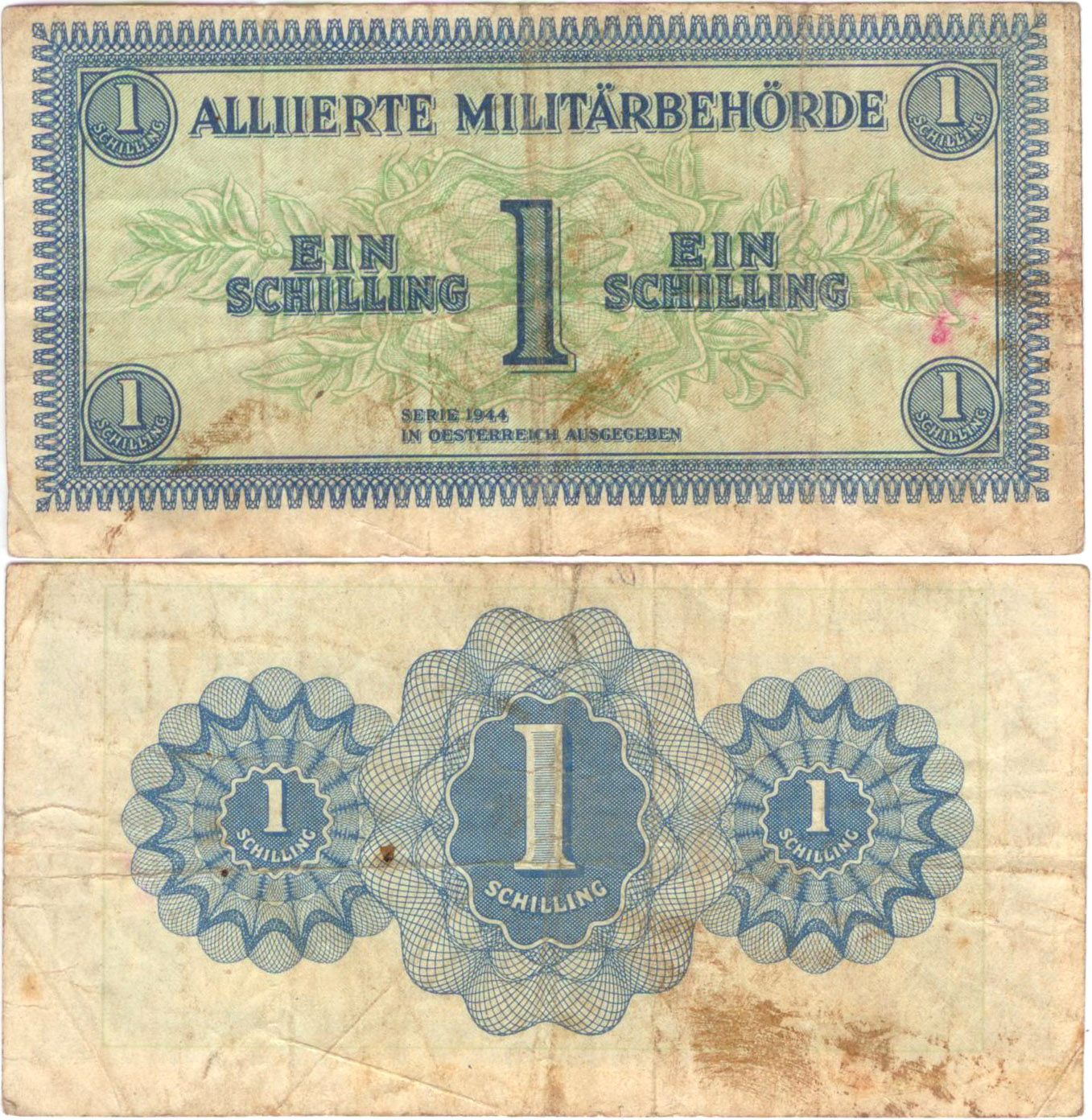
Austria

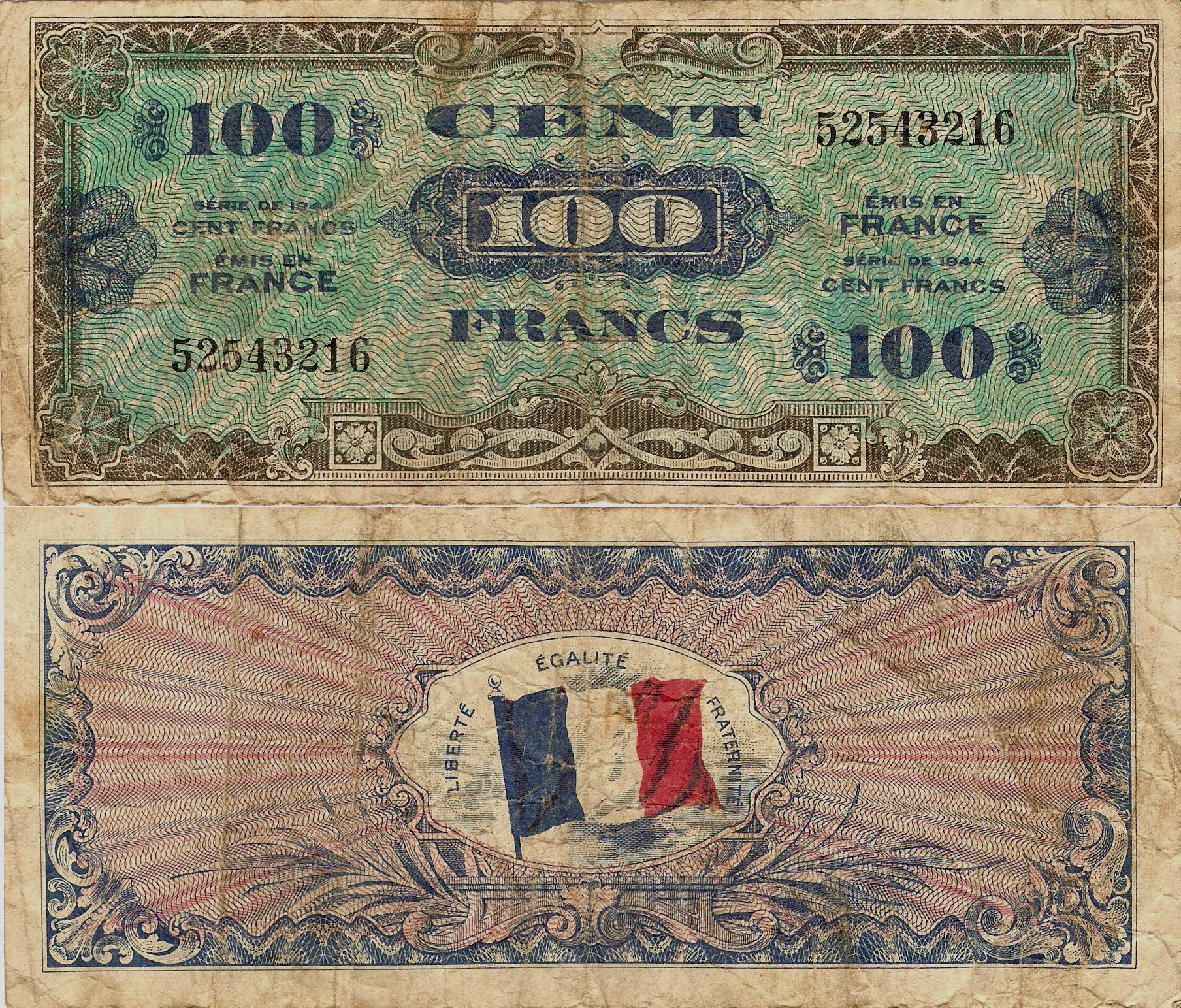
France

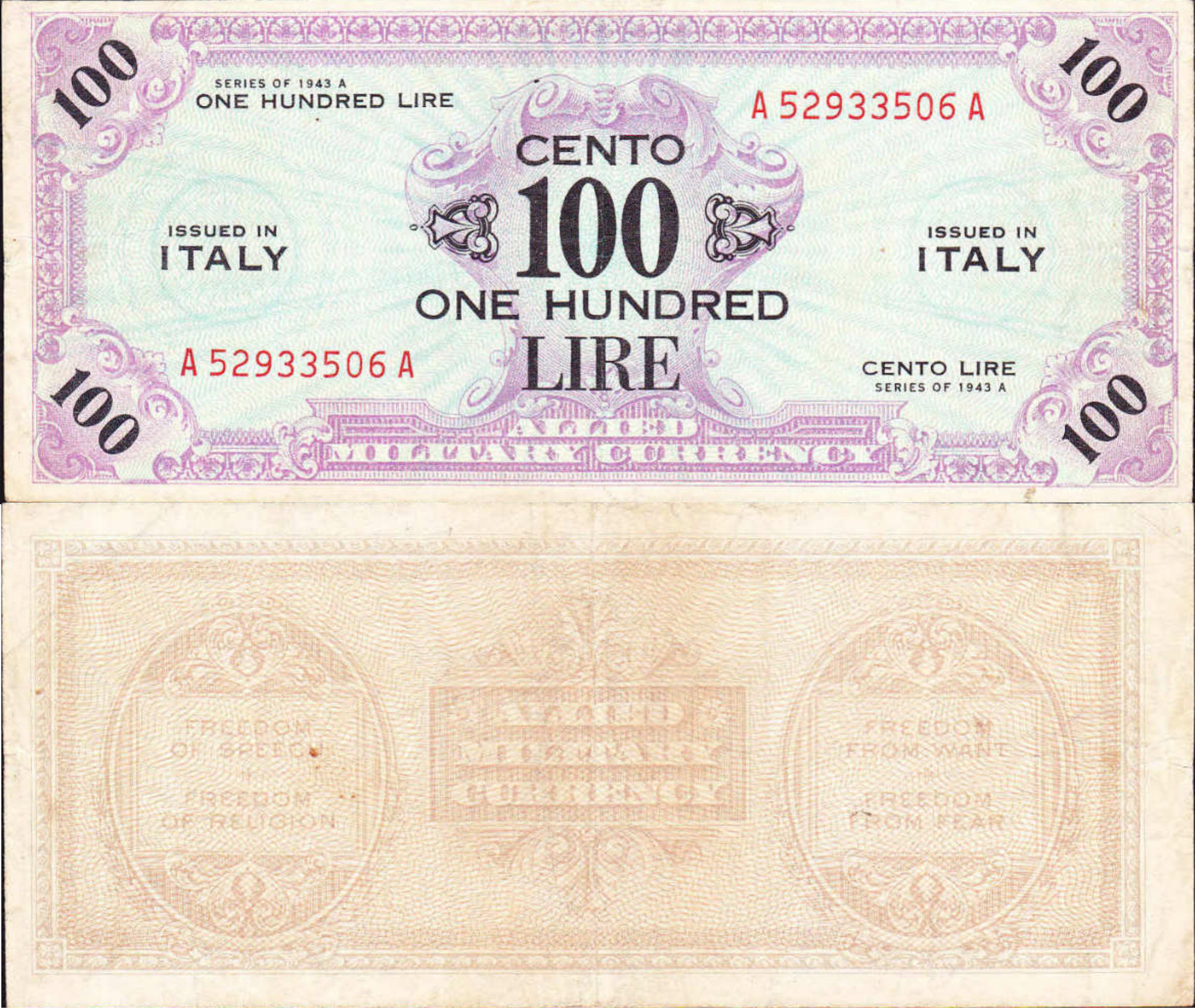
Italy

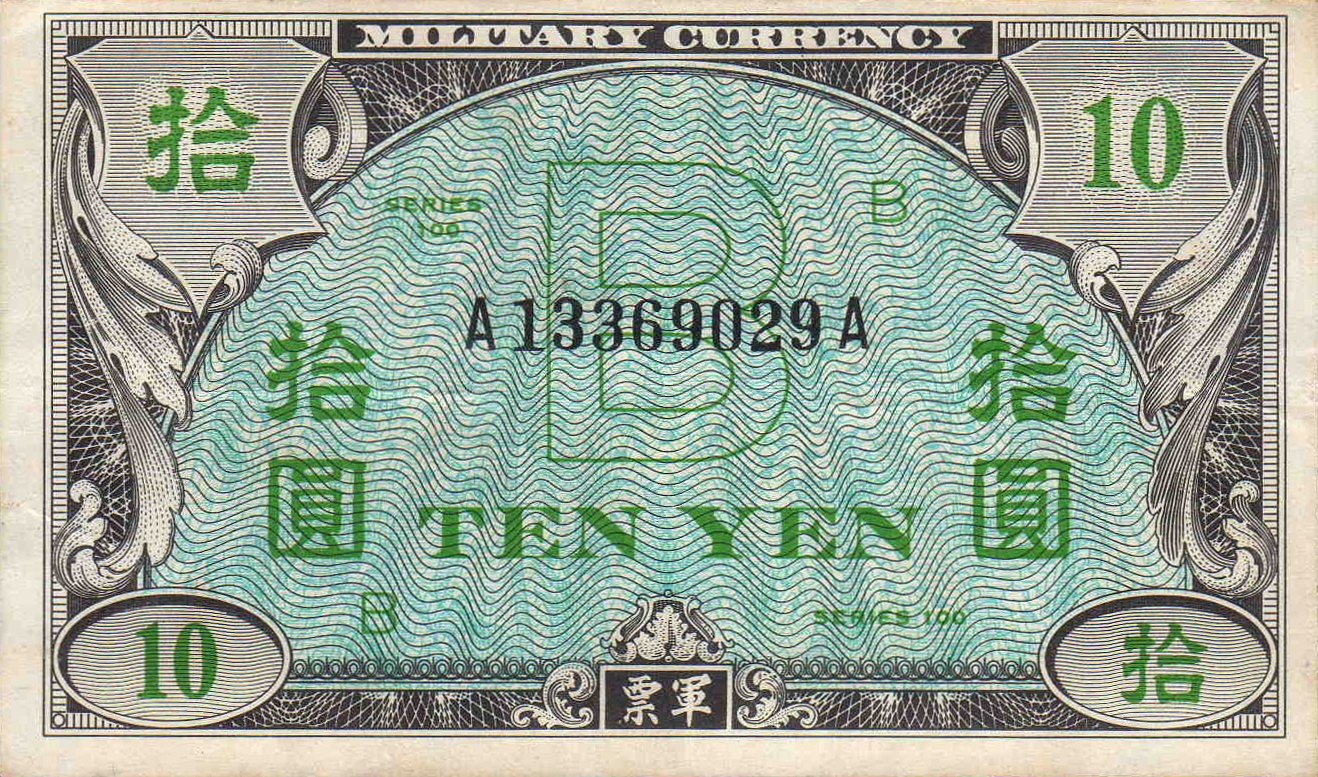
Japan

Five types of currency were issued:

- German Allied Military Currency (Mark)
- Austrian Allied Military Currency (Schilling)
- French Allied Military Currency (Franc)
- Italian Allied Military Currency (Lira)
- Japanese Allied Military Currency (A yen and B yen) - used in Korea, issued for use in Japan but then demonetized there before they could be used

The majority of the notes were printed by the United States Bureau of Engraving and Printing, with some were printed by the Soviet Union and by the Japanese Ministry of Finance.

== Collectors ==
Notes today are fairly common, and can be valued anywhere from one dollar (for a common bill) to a couple thousand dollars for a rare series, low printing, or replacement bill.

== See also ==
- Military Payment Certificate
- Japanese invasion money
