= Grand National Treasure =

Treasures owned by the Thai monarchy

In Thailand, Grand National Treasure refers to objects that, in the past, were made by the national purse and bestowed by the King to Royal Family members, courtiers, and high-ranking officials. The national treasure also includes items that are valuable in terms of history and Thai artistic features.

The treasures include regalia, royal decorations, ornaments, and Thai coins. These treasures are currently in the custody of the Bureau of Grand National Treasure, The Treasury Department. The national treasures are restored, conserved, and displayed for the general public at the Pavilion of Regalia, Royal Decorations and Coins in the Royal Grand Palace.

== Royal Regalia ==
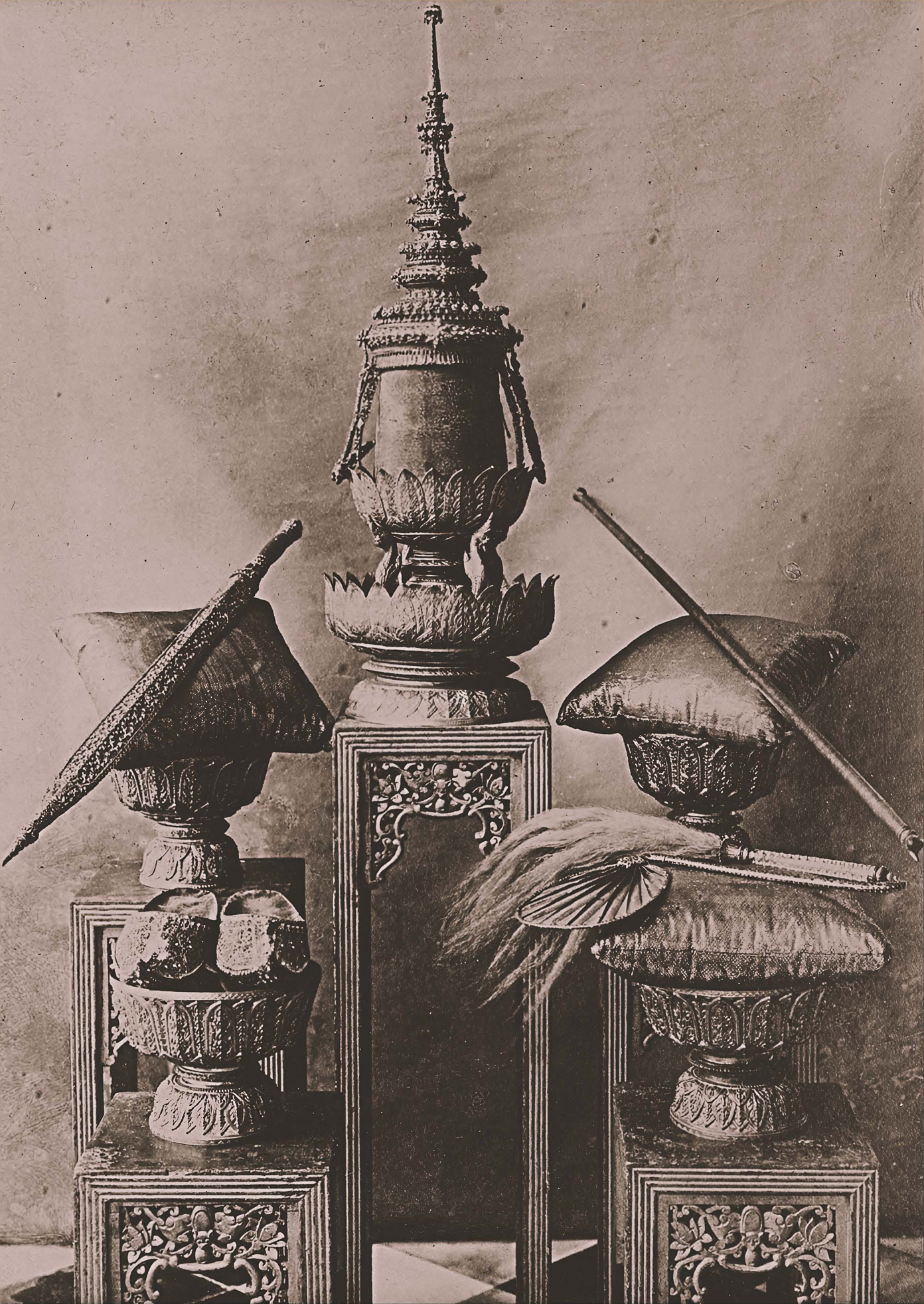
The Royal Regalia of Siam

Regalia symbolized prestige and rank, and were also rewards for good services. It was an ancient tradition that the King bestowed regalia on members of the Royal family, courtiers and officials, according to their rank and status. The recipients would display regalia during important royal ceremonies and on special occasions. The bestowing of regalia was later revised after the royal decorations were established during the Bangkok period to signify rank and prestige. The regalia was then bestowed only on high-ranking members of the royal family as symbols of their status and as components of the Chulachom Klao decorations.

Types of Regalia are classified into seven categories:

1. Regalia for prosperity

This type of regalia was bestowed for prosperity and to remind the recipients to perform their duties with righteousness and prudence. The Regalia for Prosperity includes items such as the Ceremonial Gold Chain, the amulet chain, the 108 gold beaded rosary and nine gems ring.

2. Headgear

Headgear was conferred only to members of the royal family and high-ranking couriers. Headgear includes items such as the Royal Crown and Pointed Crown (for bestowing on the King's sons), various types of decorated hats, namely"Phra Mala Sao Soong" (for bestowing on royal children of Chao Fah title), The “Sao Satern Hat” (for male courtiers with the Chao Phraya title), and “Song Prabhas Hat” (for officials of the equivalent rank to a town governor).

3. Attires

Attire was presented to those who performed duties as the King's representatives as well as to those who served well in war. There are different types of garments, such as blouses, robes, gowns and trousers.

4. Weapons of rank

Weapons of rank were presented to male courtiers and male officials for exploits in war. These Weapons of rank are considered the highest honor given to recipients. They include items such as swords, daggers, long-handled swords, lances and guns.

5. Royal Paraphernalia Set

The Royal Paraphernalia Set is made up of personal utensils of the monarch for daily use, which were bestowed on any members of the royal family, courtiers or officials. The Royal Paraphernalia Set includes items such as betel nut tray sets, betel nut boxes, spittoons, cylindrical kettles and water pitchers.

6. Umbrellas of state, sunshades, fans and flags

These items were presented for use as symbols of the recipient's rank during important ceremonies. There are various kinds of umbrellas, including Chatra, Klod, Suppathon, and Kanching, sunshades (called “Bangsoon” and “Bangsaek”), a whip of yak hair (“Chamorn”), a palm leaf fan (called “Phatbok”), and flags.

7. Vehicles

Vehicles were presented to royalty and noblemen for their convenience and to signify their rank. These vehicles included a stretcher (called “Salieng”), a palanquin (called “Krae Kanya”), and a barge (called “Rua Kanya”).

== Royal Decorations ==
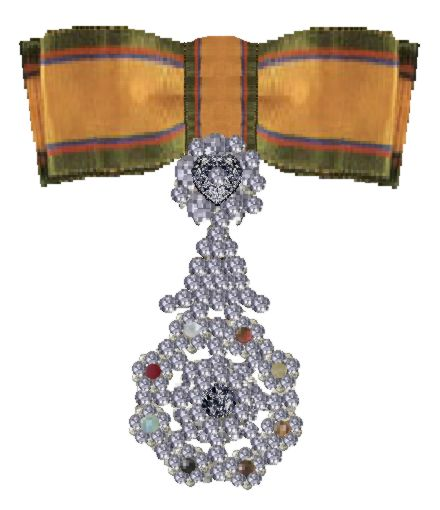
Jewel of the Order of the Nine Gems

King Mongkut of the present Chakri dynasty created the “Dara Irapot” or the “Three–headed Elephant Star” to be adorned on his attire pursuant of the European custom. In the following years, the “Dara Noparat” or the Star of Nine Gems was created to be bestowed upon members of the royal family. Other “Dara” were also created by royal command, such as ”The White Elephant Star” to be presented to officials and foreigners as a reward for their good service. The Chochasi and Rajasi Stars were bestowed on the Ministers of Defense and Interior, respectively.

The tradition of creation and bestowal of the Royal decorations has since been a legacy transmitted from every reign until the present. Although the origins of royal Thai decoration are not in current usage, their significance has been immersed into and become part of the nation's heritage.

== Ornaments ==
Ornaments are used by members of the royal family and courtiers during various auspicious ceremonies. Their design and the metal used differ according to the recipient's rank. The items include bracelets, gold chains, chest-piece decorations, rings decorated with gems, gold belts and buckles and upper arm decorations.

== Thai Coins ==
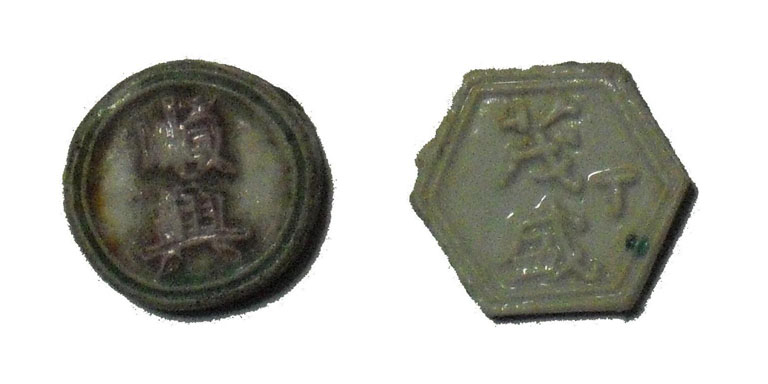
Siam pottery tokens

The evolution of Thai Coins began with the flat, round coins of the Funan Kingdom, which occupied the areas which are now Thailand around the 1st – 6th centuries A.D. The early coins of Thailand represented the influence of India and China. These early coins were made of bronze and copper and had a square hole in the center. Thai coins history is closely related to the history of India, as Indian traders and merchants traveled through Thailand en route to China. Coins from India would sometimes end up in Thailand and vice versa. It was not until the middle of the 13th century when indigenous Thai money was first introduced when the people of Sukhothai created their own money for use in the Kingdom. The money, which is commonly called “Pod Duang” by the Thais, or is better known by foreigners as “Bullet money”, had been a dominant currency in the Thai monetary system for more than 600 years before being replaced by flat modern coins in 1904.

== See also ==
- Pavilion of Regalia, Royal Decorations and Coins
