= Eagle Cash =

Cash management application

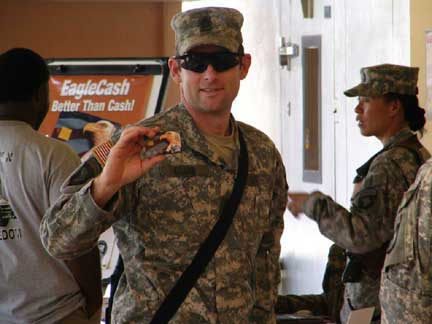
A serviceman with an EagleCash card in May 2007

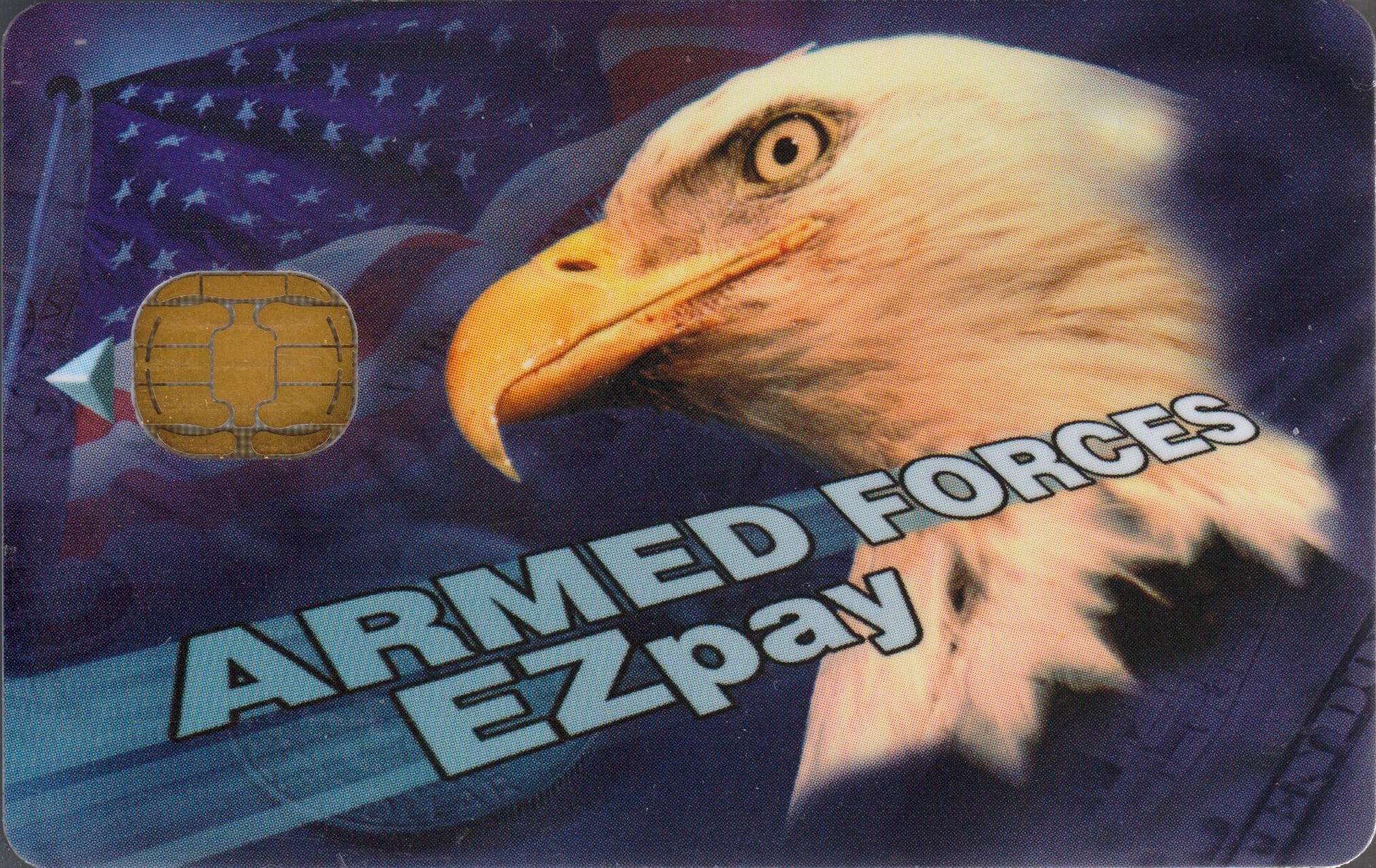
EZPay card

EagleCash and its sister programs EZpay and Navy Cash are cash management applications that use stored-value card technology to process financial transactions in "closed-loop" operating environments. The United States Department of the Treasury sponsors the programs for the United States Armed Forces. The Federal Reserve Bank of Boston administers the programs for the Treasury, and they are in use at approved U.S. military facilities inside and outside the continental United States. The systems use a plastic payment card, similar to a credit or debit card, which has an embedded microchip that tracks the card's balance and interfaces with encrypted card readers. This method allows soldiers to purchase goods and services at U.S. military posts and canteens, without carrying cash, or manage their personal bank accounts while on deployment or in training. The program reduces the amount of American currency required overseas, reduces theft, saves thousands of man-hours in labor, helps reduce the risk of transporting cash in combat environments, and increases security and convenience for service members. It helped reduce or eliminate the need for cash and money orders.

== Overview and history ==
Originally developed in 1997, the EZpay system was born as a pilot project aimed at inductees going into basic training, to alleviate some of the stress and cost of managing money while away from home. Many U.S. military bases are structured like small towns, where goods and services are available for sale. Transferring wages into cash for making purchases has traditionally been a struggle. The system provides soldiers with an advance on their wages in the form of the EZPay card, which they can use to purchase goods and services at on-base shops and stores. At the end of basic training, the card's balance would be converted into cash, and paid back to the soldiers. The project was a great success, because it eliminated the need for bases to keep cash on hand, and saved soldiers approximately $125,000 a year in banking fees.

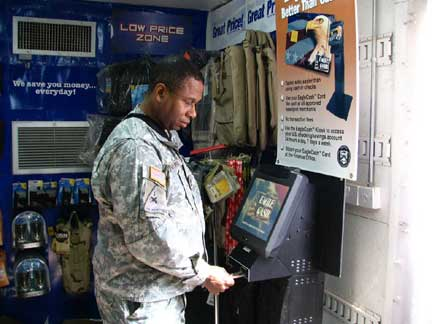
A U.S. Army soldier refills his EagleCash card at a kiosk in May 2007.

Around the same time, the EZpay system was expanded for overseas use during the aftermath of the 1992–1995 War in Bosnia and Herzegovina, where U.S. personnel were deployed on peace-keeping missions. Named "EagleCash", the overseas system functions similarly to the EZpay system, but with the added ability of soldiers to attach personal bank accounts to the card, allowing them to load, and reload, without having to access their financial institutions back home. As 386th Air Expeditionary Wing financial manager, Catherine Miles explained in a 2007 article, "It's like a gift card. [...] You can put as little or as much money as you want on it and it comes from your checking account." Unlike regular debit cards, the Eagle Cash is managed on-base, using batch processing which ensures that the cards remained useful even when connections to banks and credit unions State-side are severed. The system was given widespread acceptance in 1999, just before the War in Iraq; it has since been expanded to many military bases such as Camp Anaconda on the front lines.

== Benefits and savings ==
For soldiers, the benefits are straightforward, but for the government the benefits are much more extensive. Transporting U.S. currency overseas costs the military hundreds of thousands of dollars annually – during the Iraq War, for every $1,000,000 sent to pay soldiers in Iraq, it cost $60,000 in security, logistics, and support fees. It also eliminates the need for the World War II practice of producing the military payment certificate. The use of a cashless economy at military stores reduces transaction times, freeing personnel from tasks like stamping money orders or counting coins – during 9 months of the Iraq War, this saved approximately 5000 hours of processing time for financial personnel. It also prevents counterfeiting.

Since the initial adoption of the EagleCash system, it has been augmented by ATM-like kiosks which allow soldiers to add funds to the card without visiting the base's finance office. Originally, this requirement caused long lines to refill cards, reducing the utility of the system. The conversion to the kiosk system, developed by NCR Corporation, remedied these problems and increased the ability of the system to provide easy cash for soldiers away from home — "something we often take for granted, but for soldiers deployed on foreign land, it has always been a challenge". To date, 3.2 million EagleCash and EZpay cards have been issued and used to process 16.5 million electronic transactions valued at over $3.6 billion.

== See also ==
- Medium of exchange
- Electronic money
