= B yen =

Currency used in the Ryukyu Islands (1945–1958)

B yen (B円, B en)
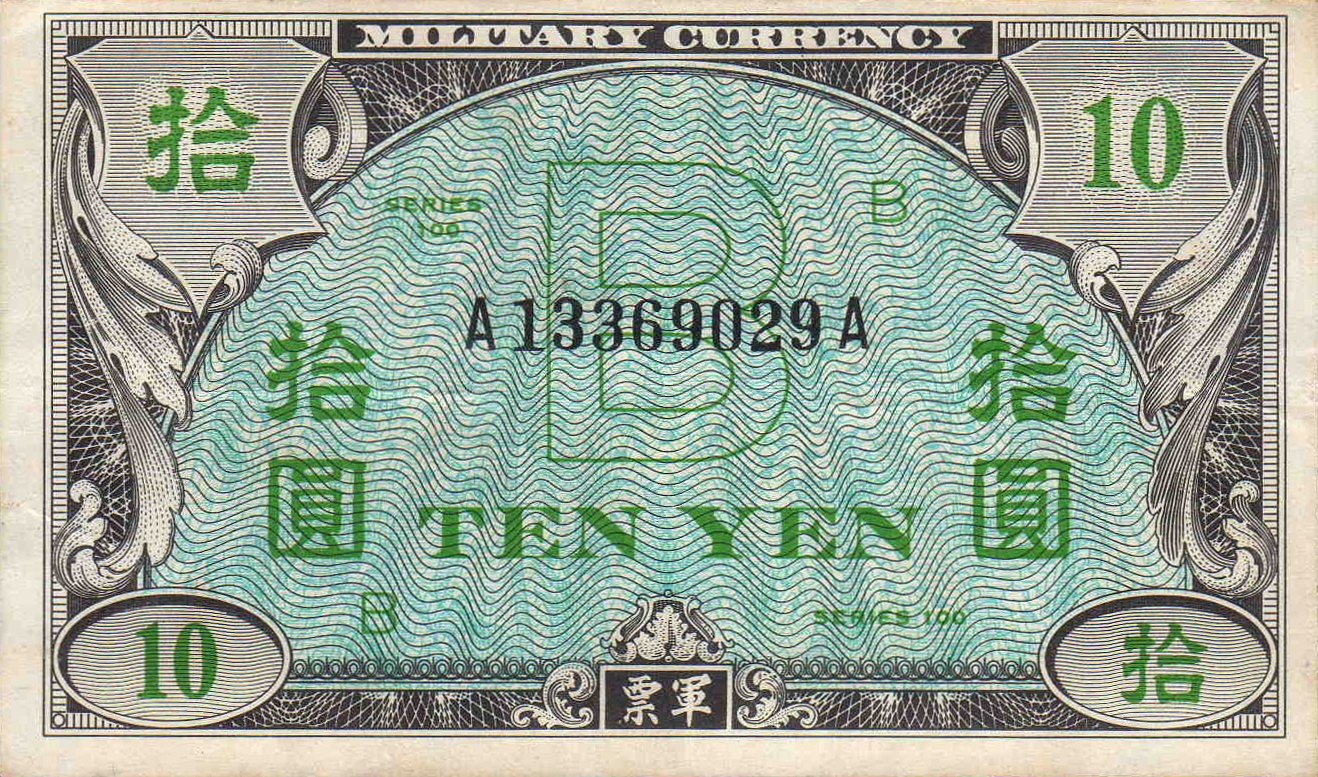
- Obverse of the 10 yen B-yen

ISO 4217
- Code: none

Unit
- Plural: B yen
- Symbol: ¥

Denominations
- Subunit
- 1/100: sen (銭)
- Banknotes: 10s, 50s, 1¥, 5¥, 10¥, 20¥, 100¥, 1000¥

Demographics
- User(s): Occupied Ryukyu Islands

Issuance
- Central bank: United States Civil Administration of the Ryukyu Islands
- This infobox shows the latest status before this currency was rendered obsolete.

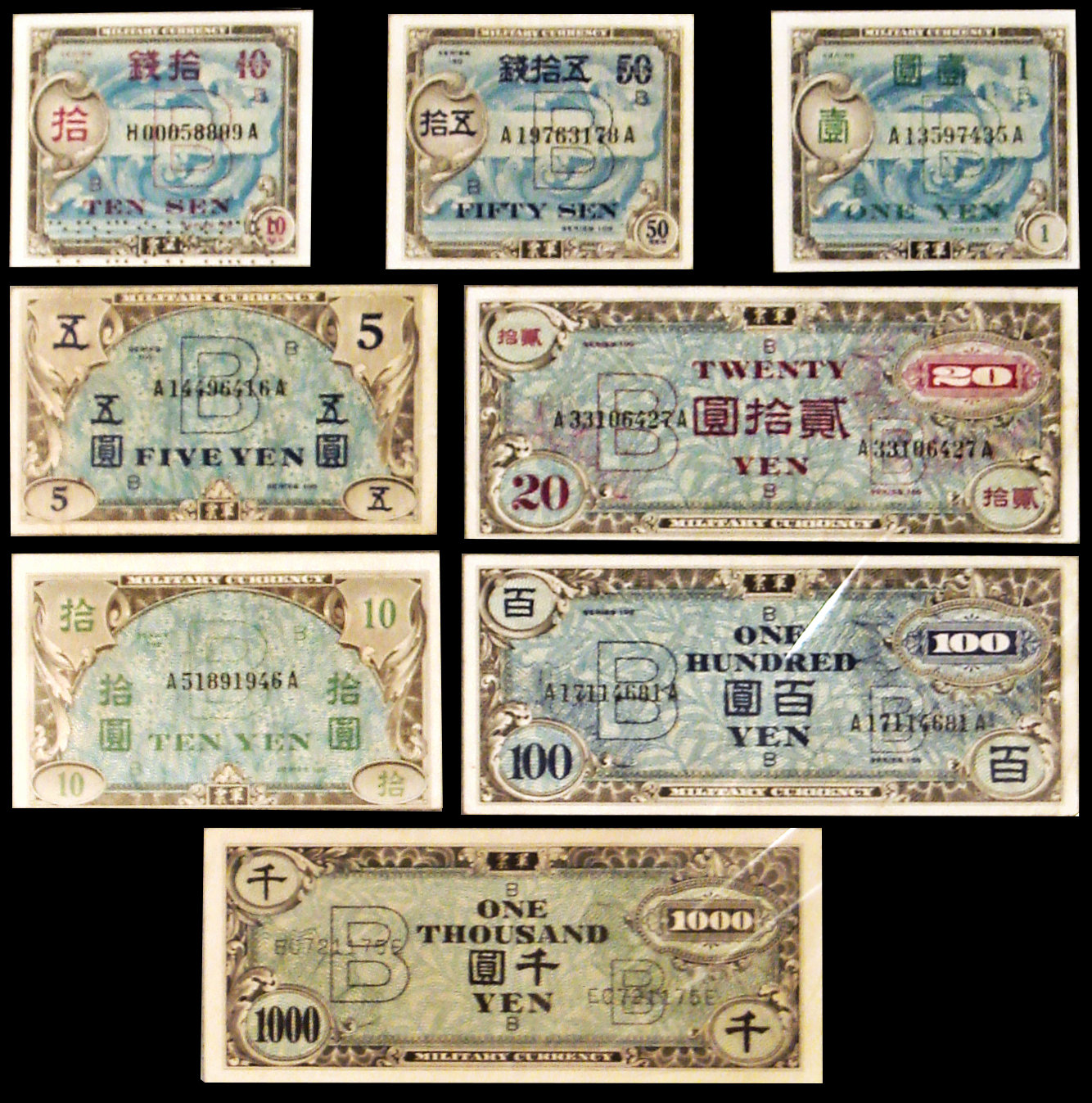
A complete set of B yen notes (1945–1958)

B yen (B円, B en) was a colloquial term used to refer to a form of military scrip used in the US-occupied Ryukyu Islands after World War II, from April 15, 1946, to September 1958. Officially, it was called B type military scrip (B型軍票, B-gata gunpyō).

== Currency ==
The B yen bills were of a blue or green color, and came in eight different denominations.

== History ==
Two different types of scrip were issued during the occupation of Okinawa Prefecture by US forces. The United States military used a separate scrip called "A type yen" while "B type yen" were only used by the local civilians. In the brief time between the 1945 battle of Okinawa and the beginning of the US occupation, the islands went from a currency-free system, relying upon barter and distributions of supplies from the authorities, to the reintroduction of currency with the B yen, the introduction of the new Japanese yen (both "new yen" and "B yen" being used concurrently for a time), and then the establishment of the B yen as the only legal currency.

Beginning in 1948, the A type yen was deprecated, and B type yen came to be used by military and civilians.

Though the rest of Occupied Japan continued to use regular Japanese yen throughout the occupation, military scrip was introduced in Okinawa because, even at that time, the US military government intended to continue occupation of Okinawa long after ending it in the Home Islands. Steps were taken to prevent inflation which would have resulted from the illegal influx of regular yen from the Home Islands. Once the economy in Okinawa was considered stable enough, the B yen was done away with, and the US dollar brought into use.

An announcement was made by the office of Lt. Gen. Donald Prentice Booth, High Commissioner of the Ryukyu Islands and Commanding General of the U.S. Army on the Islands. As of September 16, 1958, the B yen was replaced with the US dollar, at an exchange rate of 120 B yen to the dollar.

The exchange rate at the time for the Japanese yen used in mainland Japan was 360 yen to US$1. This was done, in part, to encourage foreign investment by aligning Okinawa's economy with an international standard, though it is often said to have also contributed significantly to the dependence of Okinawa's economy upon the US, and the US military bases located there.

After the B yen was demonetised, rather than being incinerated, as is usual with obsolete banknotes, the B yen banknotes were placed into large concrete containers with indelible red dye, which were buried at sea at unrecoverable depths.

Professor Michiko Iha of the University of the Ryukyus has argued that the B yen was part of a scheme by the occupying authorities to keep the dollar strong and yen weak, in order to more cheaply construct and maintain military bases.

== See also ==
- Ryukyuan mon
- Allied Military Currency

Preceded by: de jure Japanese yen (de facto none, barter); Reason: Battle of Okinawa, and the Surrender of Japan.	Currency of the Ryukyu Islands; 1946 – 1958	Succeeded by: US dollar Reason: Stabilisation of the economy. Ratio: 120 B yen = 1 dollar
