= Bureau of Grand National Treasure =

The Bureau of Grand National Treasure is a Thai government agency within the Treasury Department, Ministry of Finance. Its main responsibilities are the safe-keeping, restoration and conservation of the national treasures such as regalia, royal ceremonial and decorative items as well as ancient Thai money, and publicising them to the general public and tourists.

== History ==
The task of safe-keeping and conserving the national treasures was formerly performed by the Royal Treasury Department. Following the transition from an absolute monarchy to a constitutional one in 1932, the government separated the national treasures from the crown property and assigned the task of their safekeeping to the Royal Treasury, a government agency under the supervision of the Royal Finance Department, which in 1936 became the Treasury Department. The history of the bureau goes back to 1976, when Suthon Satheinthai, the director general, realised the importance of promoting ancient Thai money and coins to the public and tourists. By royal permission, a section of the Bureau of the Royal Household's office was used as a museum, which was named "Thai Coin Pavilion" and was under the supervision of the Central Finance Division. King Bhumibol and Queen Sirikit, together with Princess Sirindhorn and Princess Chulabhon, presided over the opening ceremony on April 14, 1976.

In 1978, the museum expanded its exhibition by including the display of royal regalia and royal decorations and changed the name to "The Pavilion of Regalia, Royal Decorations and Thai Coins". The royal family once again graciously presided over the opening ceremony on August 11, 1978.

The pavilion was elevated to become "The Division of Regalia and Coins", with the responsibility to oversee the display of regalia, royal decorations and coins at "The Pavilion of Regalia, Royal Decorations and Thai Coins" which was later in 1992 changed to the current name, "The Pavilion of Regalia, Royal Decorations and Coins."

In 1997, the Division of Regalia and Coins was included under the newly established, Bureau of Monetary Management. Later in 2002, it was separated and promoted to the Bureau of Grand National Treasure reporting directly to the Treasury Department; it has been assigned the safe-keeping and conserving the national treasures as well disseminating information about the national treasures to tourists and the general public through displays and exhibitions.

The Bureau of Grand National Treasure is divided into five central divisions: the Conservation and Registration Division, the Grand National Treasure Exhibition Division, the Product Management Division, the Revolving Fund Management Division, the Administration Division, and two regional divisions, which are the Treasury Pavilion 1 in Chiang Mai Province and Treasury Pavilion 2 in Songkhla Province.

== Responsibilities ==
The Bureau of Grand National Treasure has main responsibilities covering three primary activities:

1. The Conservation and Registration of the national treasures which have more than 90,000 items in its protection. The items include the royal regalia, the origin of royal decorations, the seasonal attire of the Emerald Buddha, different types of jewelry, golden and silver trees, ancient money, coins and medals.
1. The exhibition of the national treasures to tourists and the general public at the Pavilion of Regalia, Royal Decoration and Coin in the Royal Grand Palace and the Treasury Pavilion in Chiang Mai Province. The aim is to show the national treasures which manifest exquisite ancient Thai craftsmanship as well as to raise awareness to the Thais to realize the importance of these national treasures as part of the country's cultural heritage. This also includes outreach programs such as holding and participating in mobile exhibition both locally and overseas as well as overseeing an online museum.
1. Coin product management, which is associated with the Treasury Department's task of producing and issuing Thai coins. The Bureau oversees the procurement and selling of coin products with the prime purpose of promoting coin collecting among Thais.

== See also ==
- Pavilion of Regalia, Royal Decorations and Coins
- Evolution of Thai money
