= 50 Cent (disambiguation) =

50 Cent (born 1975) is an American rapper.

50 Cent may also refer to:

- Kelvin Martin (1964–1987), criminal from the Bronx, New York known as 50 Cent
- 50 Cent Party, groups of Chinese netizens allegedly paid by the Chinese government to promote the policies of the Chinese Communist Party
- 50 CENT, a song by Dean Blunt from the album Black Metal
