= 50 sen note =

1872–1948 currency note in Japan

- Country: Japan
- Value: 1/2 Japanese yen
- Years of printing: 1872–1948 (Note: Non consecutive)

Obverse
- Design: Various designs depending on the series.

Reverse
- Design: Various designs depending on the series.

The 50 sen note (五十銭紙幣) was a denomination of Japanese yen in six different government issued series from 1872 to 1948 for use in commerce. Those in the "Meiji Tsūhō" series are the first modern banknotes issued after Japanese officials studied western culture. Counterfeiting eventually became an issue which led to the issuance of "Ōkura-kyō" notes in 1882. These were issued as part of a larger series featuring Empress Jingū on the obverse. Both of these series of fifty sen notes circulated alongside fifty sen coins until their abolishment in 1899. No additional notes were issued for this era as the other four series are tied in some way to the world wars. Fifty sen notes returned during the Taishō era in the form of an emergency issue due to a coin shortage and rising silver prices. These were issued between 1917 and 1922 before the situation settled enough to resume coinage. Silver became an issue again during the Shōwa era in lieu of the Second Sino-Japanese War, which prompted the government to issue "Fuji Sakura" notes in 1938. As the war raged on, the notes were changed in design to be more nationalistic. The "Yasukuni" series was issued from 1942 to 1945 depicting images related to State Shinto. These were allowed to be released again for a final time after the war had ended. Fifty sen notes were last issued in 1948 featuring no references to the Emperor. Pre-war notes were abolished on August 31, 1948, while the last series continued to circulate until the end of 1953. Fifty sen notes are now bought and sold as collector's items depending on condition.

== Meiji & Taishō ==
=== Meiji Tsūhō (1872) ===
The first fifty sen notes adopted and released by the Japanese government are known as "Meiji Tsūhō half yen" (明治通宝半円) notes, which are part of the "Meiji Tsūhō" (明治通宝) series. Notes from this series are the first Japanese currency ever to be printed using western printing at "Dondorf and Naumann", which was located in Frankfurt. Tomomi Iwakura met with Otto von Bismarck in March 1871 (Meiji 4) as part of the Iwakura Mission to study western culture. The "Paper Money Office" (known today as the National Printing Bureau) was later established in July of that year following the abolition of the han system. This entity was later organized into the "Paper Money Bureau" in January 1872. Incomplete banknotes manufactured by Dondorf Naumann began to arrive from Germany around the same time. These notes were left incomplete for security reasons which required the words "Meiji Tsuho" and the mark of the Minister of Finance to be supplemented and printed at the Paper Money Bureau. Woodblock printing was eventually employed to save hundreds of people the work of handwriting the characters "Meiji Tsuho" on each individual note. These fifty sen notes were eventually released in April, 1872 (year 5) giving Japan a westernized currency system to go with the recently established yen. All of the old former government and clan banknotes were intended for exchange upon the issuance of the new currency. Meiji Tsūhō notes were given an elaborate design that was difficult to forge as counterfeiting was previously rampant with these clan notes. These thieves eventually adapted to these changes by legally obtaining unstamped Meiji Tsūhō notes sent to Japan from Germany. Normally Japanese officials would add stamps to the notes finalizing the process, where in this case the counterfeiters added their own stamps. Counterfeiting and issues with paper quality led the Japanese government to issue redesigned fifty sen banknotes in 1882. The old Meiji Tsūhō fifty sen notes were eventually phased out in exchange for subsidiary silver coinage before being abolished on December 9, 1899.

=== Ōkura-kyō series (1882) ===
Previous Meiji Tsūhō fifty sen notes were printed using western technology which had its disadvantages in terms of quality. Over time these fragile notes became discolored easily due to the climate of Japan. Counterfeiting was another issue as these thieves eventually found a way around the elaborate Meiji Tsūhō design. This was done by legally purchasing unstamped notes from Germany as mentioned in the section above. Fifty sen notes from this series are referred to as Ōkura-kyō (大蔵卿50銭) aka 改造紙幣50銭, as the seal of the Chief administrator of the Ministry of the Treasury is featured on the obverse design. The reverse side features a serial number and counterfeit penalties which were later expanded in the Meiji era until May 8, 1897 (year 30). These notes were issued in a hurry as they were not originally planned to be a part of this redesigned note series. The redesigned yen denominations feature an artist's representation of Empress Jingū that was commissioned by Italian engraver Edoardo Chiossone. This "portrait" was omitted from fifty sen notes in favor of a simple design that could be completed more quickly to meet scheduling. The series as a whole was still considered to be "extremely decorative" and received top-class reputation internationally. These notes were made as a countermeasure against counterfeiting by using the best technology available at the time. New paper called "mitsumata" was domestically produced for the notes by the National Printing Bureau. Fifty sen notes were printed with dimensions of 65 mm x 101 mm with a watermark which made them difficult to forge.

Ōkura-kyō fifty sen notes were issued with twenty sen notes in December 1882 (year 15) to a favorable public reception. The "Convertible Bank-notes Law" was adopted afterwards in May 1884 which provided the issuance of Bank of Japan notes in denominations of yen. This law allowed Bank of Japan notes to be exchangeable for silver coinage, and was promulgated to gradually convert government issued currency (redesigned series) into silver after 1886. The Japanese government adopted the gold standard on March 26, 1897, which switched over the redemption of government banknotes from silver to gold. It was during this time that the government decided to end the circulation of government issued banknotes by the end of the century. Fifty sen Ōkura-kyō notes were thus abolished on December 31, 1899 (year 32) along with other government banknotes.

=== Taishō fractional notes (1917–1922) ===
50 sen note from 1917 (year 6)

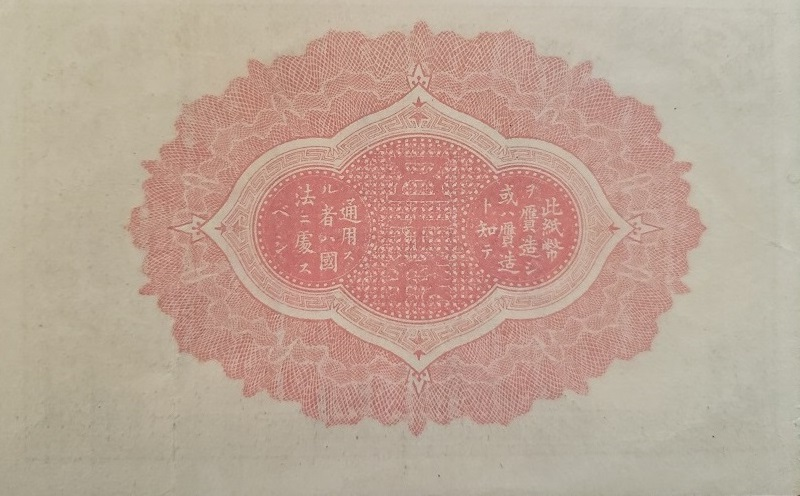
50 sen (reverse)

During the reign of Emperor Taishō, the Japanese government initially issued silver coinage as had been done previously under Meiji. World War I started on July 28, 1914, eventually bringing Japan a booming economy due to a large trade surplus. The negative effects from this event included an increased demand for subsidiary coins which led to a coin shortage. Silver bullion to make silver subsidiary coins also rose above their face value which posed a financial challenge to the mint. To remedy the situation an imperial ordinance was promulgated on October 29, 1917, issuing fractional currency in the amount of thirty million yen. Actual issuance occurred in the following month with the notes being legal tender up to ten yen. The series as a whole is known as Taishō fractional notes (大正小額政府紙幣), which were issued at the time by the treasury rather than the Bank of Japan as the series was considered an emergency issue. Taishō era fifty sen notes measure 103 mm x 65 mm in size and have a black and pink hue. The obverse side of the notes feature the Finance Minister's seal and chrysanthemum flower emblem, while on the reverse is decorated in a colored pattern. There is a central feature on the reverse side which mentions counterfeit penalties (1 year imprisonment or 200,000 yen fine) enforced by law.

It was initially agreed that the notes would be bound by a restriction stating that they could only be issued until one year after the end of the war. This date came and went as World War I ended in November 1918 (year 7 of Taishō) and the new year began. It was ultimately decided to allow the issuance to continue for a while longer as there was still a shortage in coinage. Fifty sen notes were issued until 1922 (year 11) when they were discontinued in favor of silver coinage. Rapid inflation caused by World War II eventually rendered Taishō fifty sen notes worthless and obsolete. The notes held on to their legal tender status until August 31, 1948, when they were abolished. Subsidiary coinage and currency as a whole was eventually demonetized at the end of 1953 when the Japanese government passed a law abolishing it in favor of the yen. Currencies of less than one yen were rarely used by this time anyway due to the excessive post-war inflation.

== Shōwa ==
=== Fuji Sakura (1938) ===
Japan found itself in conflict when the Marco Polo Bridge Incident occurred in July 1937 (year 12 of Shōwa). This incident would eventually lead to the gradual occupation of Chinese territory by the Japanese as the Second Sino-Japanese War. The National Mobilization Law was legislated in the Diet of Japan by Prime Minister Fumimaro Konoe on March 24, 1938, to prepare the country for a potentially prolonged war. Konoe's action led to the promulgation of the "Temporary Currency Law" which came into effect on June 1, 1938. It now became possible to change the material and purity of money without a resolution from the Imperial Diet. Fifty sen coins at the time had been made out of silver, which is a precious metal that was rising in price at the time. The production of these coins was suspended in favor of banknotes as the Japanese government wanted to redeem the alloy. The notes issued are called "Fuji Sakura 50 sen" (富士桜50銭) as Mount Fuji and sakura are featured on the obverse side of the notes. There are no features on the reverse side other than ornamentation and the value written in Latin and Kanji script. Fuji Sakura notes were first released to the public when the "Temporary Currency Law" came into effect. They were ultimately produced in large amounts which exceeded a billion notes issued. The notes were legal tender until August 31, 1948, when they were abolished.

=== Yasukuni (1942–1945) ===
Fifty sen notes made during this time are called "Yasukuni 50 sen" (靖国50銭札), after the now controversial Yasukuni Shrine. This shrine is featured on the obverse side of the notes along with the symbolic golden kite. Both of these are war themed as the shrine honors those who died in service of Japan, and allegedly Emperor Jimmu used the kite to defeat his enemies in battle. The reverse side of these notes meanwhile feature Mt. Takachiho-no-mine, which is also symbolic and sacred in Shinto folklore. No fifty sen coins were minted during World War II due to a shortage of metal used for production. Yasukuni fifty sen notes were an emergency government issued series approved by the Minister of Finance rather than the Imperial Diet. The design and printing process was "simplified" when compared to Fuji Sakura notes, with printing outsourced to the private sector. Each note measures 65 mm x 105 mm in size, and watermarks in the form of waves and Latin "50"s were added to deter counterfeiting. These notes were first issued on December 8, 1942 which was the first anniversary of the Attack on Pearl Harbor on the Japanese side of the date line. Over a billion of these Yasukuni first series notes were produced and issued before World War II ended, and a new series began. Yasukuni notes of this post-war second series are also referred to as the "A series" (A五十銭). These notes were manufactured towards the end of 1945 under the GHQ occupation policy which initially prohibited the use of State Shinto designs. The design was allowed to continue for this final issue with changes to the wording acknowledging the "government" rather than "Empire" of Japan. Printing for the notes changed from letterpress to offset due to the postwar turmoil and a lack of materials. This change caused the notes to have the number of colors decreased which is most noticeable on the obverse. While there was no reduction in size, the security watermarks were changed to a Paulownia. These notes were issued in March 1946 and were legal tender until August 31, 1948, when they were abolished.

=== B series (1948) ===
Fifty sen notes of the "B series" (B五十銭) were printed in response to coinage supply issues. When World War II ended, a large amount of brass was left over from war material used to make aircraft. The Japanese government made do with the situation by using the alloy to produce fifty sen coins in 1946 until the brass supplies eventually ran out. Fifty sen notes were first printed in March 1948 (year 23 of Shōwa) to fill the void left behind. The series as a whole was made at various private printing locations due to "new yen switching", inflation, and war damage to printing bureau facilities. Both the Bank of Japan and the Government of Japan issued these notes with the seal of the minister of finance. Notes of the "B series" are also referred to as "Itagaki 50 sen" (板垣五十銭) after the obverse design featuring Itagaki Taisuke. The reverse side of these notes meanwhile feature the National Diet Building with a floral design. Fifty sen "B series" notes measure 105 mm x 65 mm in size, and were poorly made in terms of quality. These notes omit the chrysanthemum seal, and any mention of the word "Empire" per GHQ policy. Large amounts of "B series" notes were made as they circulated in commerce while being devalued by rapid inflation. They were eventually demonetized at the end of 1953 when the Japanese government passed a law abolishing subsidiary notes in favor of the yen. Currencies of less than one yen were rarely used by this time due to excessive post-war inflation.

=== Shōwa era designs ===
Series	Obverse	Reverse
1938 (昭和13) ("Fuji Sakura")		
1942–1944 (昭和17–19) ("Yasukuni") ("First issue series")		
1945 (昭和20) ("Yasukuni") (2nd series aka "A series")		
1948 (昭和23) (Note: These notes are not dated) ("B series")		

== Collecting ==
The value of any given banknote is determined by survivability rate and condition as collectors in general prefer original notes with bright rich coloring. In contrast to this are notes with ink stains, missing pieces, and evidence of repairs which can all impact the value of any given note. The oldest fifty sen notes (aka half yen notes) include the Meiji Tsūhō series which were first issued in 1872 and later abolished in 1899. These were all made in Germany with a print run of 22,717,569 notes during their fifteen year use in commerce. This figure is low when compared to other denominations such as the higher face value Meiji Tsūhō one yen notes. Fifty sen Meiji Tsūhō notes are rare in uncirculated grades as many of them are now worn and deteriorated. These notes can be obtained in average condition for 10,000+ yen (~$100+ USD), with prices reaching 100,000 yen (~$1,000 USD) for examples in uncirculated grades. Professional grading is recommended for this series as "many" counterfeit notes exist on the market. The next series are Ōkura-kyō (redesigned) notes issued from 1882 to 1899 in denominations of twenty and fifty sen. Ōkura-kyō fifty sen notes are valued in the tens of thousands of yen ($100+ USD) for average circulated examples. This series is also rare in uncirculated grades with values higher than Meiji Tsūhō notes. The last series issued for commerce in the pre-Shōwa era were Taishō fractional notes from 1917 (Taishō year 6) to 1922 (Taishō year 11). These are valued from oldest to newest in descending amounts for any given condition.

Fuji Sakura fifty sen notes (1938) were the first Shōwa era series to be released for this denomination. These are now common as over a billion of these notes were issued leaving a large amount of existing survivors. Notes from this series remain easy and inexpensive to collect in all grades with exceptions to error and special grouping notes. The most "popular" of these groupings are examples with the serial number "{ 1 }", which is written in red ink on the obverse. Yasukuni notes issued from 1942 to 1945 share the same information as their predecessors in terms of amount issued, values, error notes, and groupings. This series differs where some notes also have the word "SPECIMEN" ("Mihon") written on them which gives them value in the tens of thousands of yen. Fifty sen notes were issued for the last time in 1948 are part of the "B series" aka Itagaki 50 sen. During this time notes were outsourced to different private printing companies which had their own serial group. The notes are accordingly valued by the last two digits in their serial numbers as some firms produced more notes than others:

Venue	Location	Last 2 digits
National Printing Bureau	Takinogawa	12
Toppan Printing	Itabashi	13
Toppan Printing	Fuji	23
Toppan Printing	Osaka	33
Dai Nippon Printing	Enokicho	44
Kyodo Printing	Koishikawa	15
Tokyo Securities Printing	Oji	16
Tokyo Securities Printing	Odawara	26
Imperial Printing	Shiba	17

Most of these notes can be collected inexpensively in uncirculated grades. Examples from Takinogawa (serial ending with 12) are worth a small premium, while those from Odawara (serial ending with 26) are rare. This only applies to the last two digits as the first digit of each note indicates authority. Notes issued on behalf of the Bank of Japan have "1" as the first digit, while government issued notes use the first digit "2".

== See also ==
- Banknotes of the Japanese yen
- Bank of Japan
- Dai-Ichi Ginko Korean notes - similar in appearance to Meiji Tsūhō notes.
