= Half guilder coin (Netherlands) =

The Half guilder coin was a silver coin struck in the Kingdom of the Netherlands between 1818 and 1930. The obverse featured a portrait of the Dutch reigning King or Queen. On the reverse was a crowned Dutch coat of arms between the value. All coins were minted in Utrecht except the year 1829 and 1830 that were minted in Brussels.

== Dimensions and weight ==
Dimensions	1/2 guilder 1818-1830	1/2 guilder 1846-1919	1/2 guilder 1921-1930	Refs
Gram	5.38 gram	5 gram	5 gram	
Diameter	24 mm	22 mm	22 mm	
Thickness	? mm	? mm	? mm	
Metal	Silver .893	Silver .945	Silver .720	

== Versions ==
Monarch	Mint	Material	Obverse	Reverse	Edge	Minting years	Refs
William I	Utrecht and Brussels	Silver	Kings bust to the right	Crowned Dutch coat of arms between value (1/2G) under the coat of arms 50c	Smooth with edge lettering ‘GOD ZY MET ONS’	1818(U), 1819(U), 1822(U), 1829(B), 1830(B)	
William II	Utrecht	Silver	Kings bust to the left	Crowned Dutch coat of arms between value (1/2G) under the coat of arms 50c	Reeded with no edge lettering	1846-1848	
William III	Utrecht	Silver	Kings bust to the right	Crowned Dutch coat of arms between value (1/2G) under the coat of arms 50c	Reeded with no edge lettering	1850, 1853, 1857-1864, 1866, 1868	
Wilhelmina	Utrecht	Silver	Queens head with diadem to the left	Crowned Dutch coat of arms between value (1/2G) under the coat of arms 50c	Reeded with no edge lettering	1898	
Wilhelmina	Utrecht	Silver	Queens head with diadem to the left	Crowned Dutch coat of arms between value (1/2G)	Reeded with no edge lettering	1904-1909	
Wilhelmina	Utrecht	Silver	Queens bust with stoat cloak to the left	Crowned Dutch coat of arms between value (1/2G)	Reeded with no edge lettering	1910, 1912, 1913, 1919	
Wilhelmina	Utrecht	Silver	Queens head to the left	Crowned Dutch coat of arms between value (1/2G)	Reeded with no edge lettering	1921, 1922, 1928-1930	
