= Military payment certificate =

Currency for payment of some US military personnel

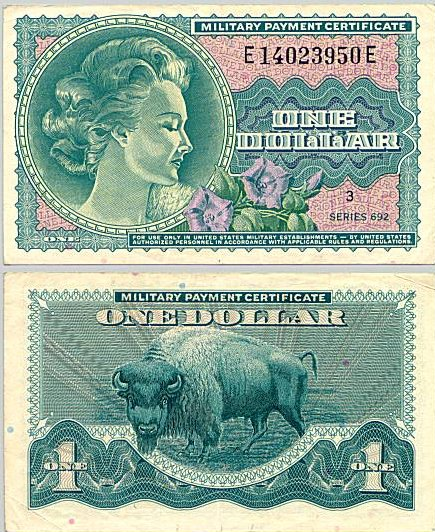
One-dollar bill Series 692 (from the Vietnam War era 1970–73)

Military payment certificates, or MPC, was a form of currency used to pay United States (US) military personnel in certain foreign countries in the mid and late twentieth century. They were used in one area or another from a few months after the end of World War II until a few months after the end of U.S. participation in the Vietnam War – from 1946 until 1973. The certificates were made by line lithography to create colorful banknotes that could be produced cheaply.

Fifteen series of MPCs were created, but only 13 series were issued. The remaining two were largely destroyed, although some examples remain. Among the 13 released series, a total of 94 notes are recognized.

== History of MPCs ==
MPCs evolved from Allied Military Currency initially used in Europe during World War II. This was a response to the large amounts of US Dollars circulated by American servicemen in post-World War II Europe. Because the futures of local governments were unclear, the local citizens might not trust local currencies. Because they preferred a stable currency like U.S. dollars, local civilians often accepted payment in dollars for less than the accepted conversion rates. As dollars became more favorable to hold, the local currencies became inflated, thwarting Allied plans to stabilize local economies.

Troops paid in dollars found merchants were willing to convert unlimited amounts of US banknotes to the local currency at the floating (black market) conversion rate. It was much more favorable to the GIs than the government fixed conversion rate. Servicemen thus profited from the more favorable exchange rate on the black market.

To reduce profiteering from such currency arbitrage, the U.S. military devised the MPC program. MPC were paper money initially denominated in amounts of 5¢, 10¢, 25¢, 50¢, $1, $5, and $10. A $20 note was added in 1968, during US involvement in the Vietnam War.

Unlike US currency, which is issued by the Department of the Treasury, these MPC were issued under the authority of the Department of War, or after 1947, Department of Defense. Consequently, they do not bear the US Treasury seal found on virtually every example of US civilian currency. MPCs were fully convertible to U.S. dollars when servicemen left a designated MPC zone, and convertible to local currencies when servicemen went on leave (but not vice versa). In order to eliminate U.S. dollars from local economies, it was illegal for unauthorized personnel to possess MPC.

Although US greenbacks were not circulating, many local merchants accepted MPC on par with US dollars, since they could use them on the black market. This was especially evident in the late twentieth century during the Vietnam War, when the MPC program was at its zenith. To prevent MPC from being used as a primary currency in the host country and destroying the local currency value and economy, the US frequently changed MPC banknote styles to deter black marketers and reduce hoarding. A "conversion day" or "C-day" was the soldiers' only chance to trade in their old MPC for the new issue, after which the old MPC became worthless.

C-days in Vietnam were always classified, never pre-announced. On a C-day, soldiers would be restricted to base, preventing them from helping Vietnamese civilians—especially those associated with local bars and brothels, such as bar girls and other black market people—from converting old MPC to the newer version. Since Vietnamese were not allowed to convert the currency, they frequently lost savings by holding old MPC that lost all value after a C-day was completed.

While a total of fifteen different series of MPC were designed in the post-World War II period, only thirteen series were issued between 1946 and 1973. Users often compared MPC to Monopoly game money due to their colors. After the official end of U.S. participation in the Vietnam War in early 1973, the only place where MPC remained in use was South Korea. In autumn of 1973, a surprise C-day was held there, and MPC were retired totally, replaced by greenbacks.

MPC were never again issued. Because MPC were not issued as formal obligations of the United States Treasury, they can no longer be redeemed for currency.

In the late 1990s, the US Department of Defense implemented a similar but updated concept with the Eagle Cash system. This used a value card system. Such cards were issued to U.S. armed forces in Bosnia, Kosovo, Djibouti, Iraq, and Afghanistan, as well as other non-combat zones on a limited basis.

== MPC in popular culture ==
A Korean War C-day is a key plot element of "Change Day," an episode from the sixth season (1977-1978) of the television series M*A*S*H. Major Charles Emerson Winchester III schemes to purchase soon-to-be-worthless MPC from local farmers and merchants for cash at 10% of face value, then trade it in and pocket a large profit. His plan is foiled when Hawkeye Pierce and B.J. Hunnicutt arrange for the military police to set up a roadblock that delays him from reaching camp in time for the exchange.

In the Vietnam War novel The Short-Timers (1979) by Gustav Hasford, Marine Sergeant James T. "Joker" Davis encounters an officer who habitually plays Monopoly with a subordinate. The two use MPC in place of the game's standard play money and divide all listed rents and prices by 10 (e.g. paying $35 rent instead of $350 for landing on Oriental Avenue with a hotel).

In “Hard Stripe”, a 1989 episode of the TV series Tour of Duty, set in Vietnam, a Finance Corps lieutenant at Tan Son Nhut in 1968 spots a soldier in illegal possession of a five dollar treasury note. He warns him to convert it to MPCs when the treasury office opens the next morning.

== See also ==
- Allied Military Currency — Currency used in recently liberated or occupied territories during and after World War II
- Banknotes of the British Armed Forces — Currency issued by the British Armed Forces from 1946 to 1972
- Japanese military currency (1937–1945)
- Eagle Cash — System used by US military personnel in the Iraq War
