= Imperial crest of Japan =

Versions
- 16 Single-layered chrysanthemum
- Armiger: Emperor, emperor emeritus, and inner-court member of the Imperial family
- Adopted: 13th century (de facto); 21 October 1926 (de jure)

Japan does not have an official coat of arms. Instead, the Imperial crest of Japan, most commonly known in English and Japanese as the chrysanthemum crest (菊紋, kikumon) (also known by other names), used for Imperial Seal or Crest for Japanese government is the mon, used by the emperor of Japan and members of the Imperial Family.

It is one of the national emblems of Japan and is used in a manner similar to a national coat of arms, such as on Japanese passports.

The 5-7 paulownia was historically the personal crest of the emperor, and as such has also been called an imperial crest. It was later adopted by the Japanese government, and it is largely used to represent the prime minister and Cabinet.

== Names ==
The imperial crest is referred to by a number of different names in English. Japanese symbolism developed separately to Western heraldry, and as such mon (紋) can be translated in a number of different ways, however most commonly as crest, but also as badge, emblem, or coat of arms. (Note: Mon are most similar in function to Western badges or coats of arms, but also have similarities with crests.) To avoid translation difficulties, mon is sometimes used as a loanword.

It is usually referred to as kikumon (菊紋) in Japanese, which is generally translated as chrysanthemum crest. The chrysanthemum is considered a noble flower, and the 16-petal chrysanthemum is the widely known symbol of the emperor, as such the name of the flower alone can be used to refer to the emperor or imperial family. (Note: for instance, see the Chrysanthemum taboo) The name imperial (chrysanthemum) crest can also be used, as well as imperial emblem, imperial coat of arms, (Note: It is notably called a coat of arms in Hugo Gerard Ströhl's Heraldischer Atlas, which was later translated by Arthur Fox-Davies in The Art of Heraldry: An Encyclopædia of Armory.) imperial (chrysanthemum) mon, or state mon.

In Japanese it is also known as chrysanthemum flower crest (菊花紋, 菊花紋章, kikukamon, kikukamonshō) and imperial chrysanthemum crest (菊の御紋, kikunogomon). In English it is sometimes called the imperial seal, however the kikumon is not a seal, and should not be confused with the actual imperial seals, the privy seal and state seal.

== History ==
During the Meiji period (1868–1912), no one was permitted to use the imperial crest except the Emperor of Japan, who used a 16-petalled chrysanthemum with sixteen tips of another row of petals showing behind the first row. Therefore, each member of the Imperial family used a slightly modified version of the crest. Shinto shrines either displayed the imperial crest or incorporated elements of the crest into their own tag.

Earlier in Japanese history, when Emperor Go-Daigo, who tried to break the power of the shogunate in 1333, was exiled, he adopted the seventeen-petalled chrysanthemum in order to differentiate himself from the Northern Court's Emperor Kōgon, who kept the imperial 16-petalled mon.

== Description ==
The 5-7 paulownia can also be referred to as an imperial crest

The symbol is a yellow or orange chrysanthemum with black or red outlines and background. A central disc is surrounded by a front set of 16 petals. A rear set of 16 petals are half staggered in relation to the front set and are visible at the edges of the flower. An example of the chrysanthemum being used is in the star of the Order of the Chrysanthemum.

Other members of the Imperial Family use a version with 14 single petals, while a form with 16 single petals is used for orders, passports, Diet members' pins, and other items that carry or represent the authority of the Emperor. The Imperial crest is also used on the standards of the Imperial Family.

== Gallery ==
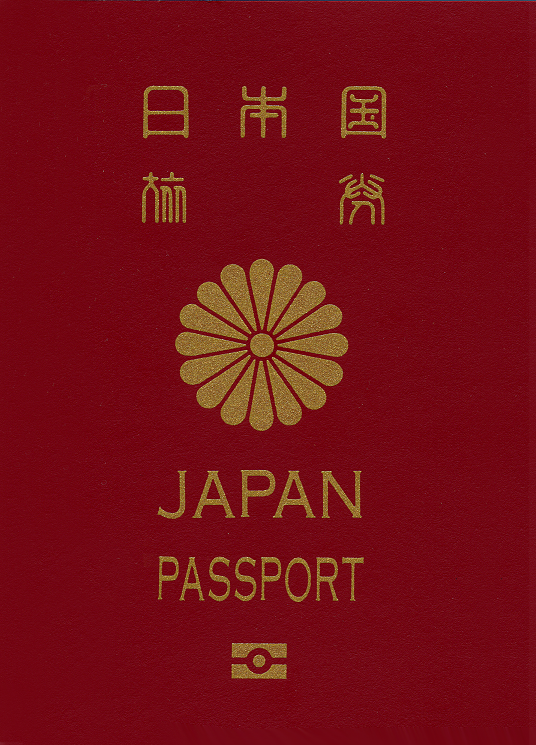
Imperial crest emblazoned on the cover of a Japanese passport

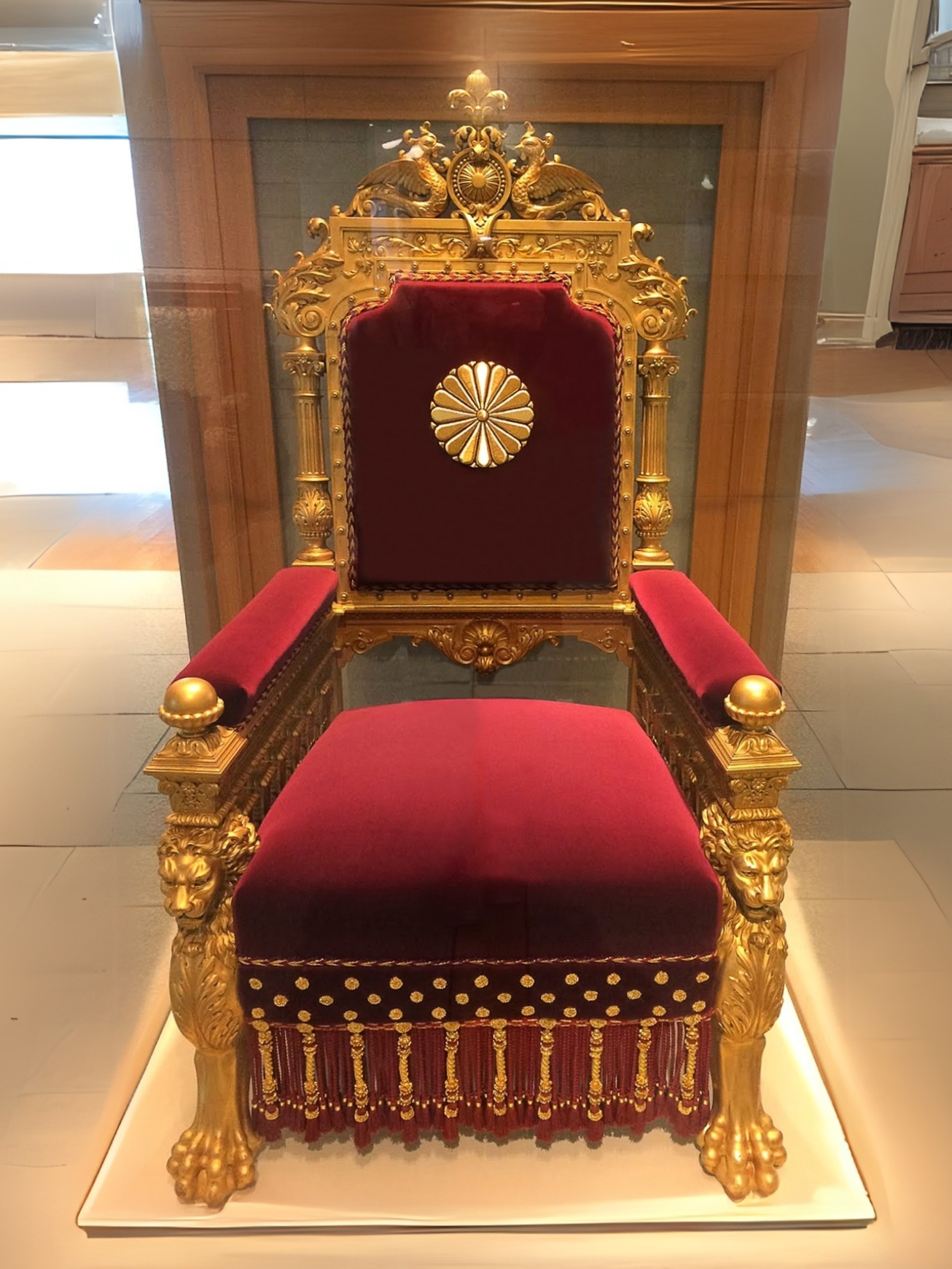
Imperial Throne of the Emperor of Japan on display at the House of Councillors

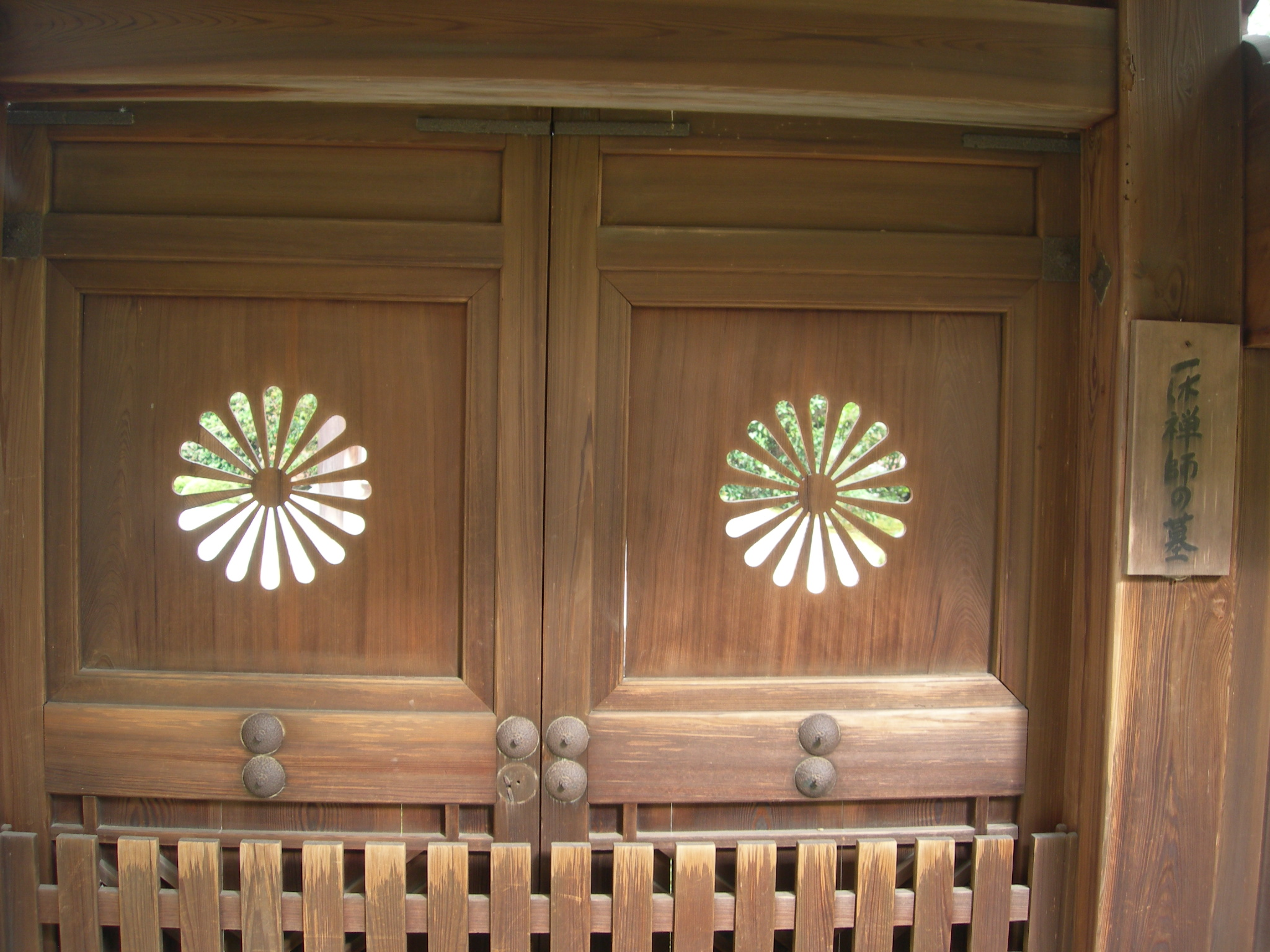
Emblazoned on the doors of a tomb in Kyōtanabe, Kyoto

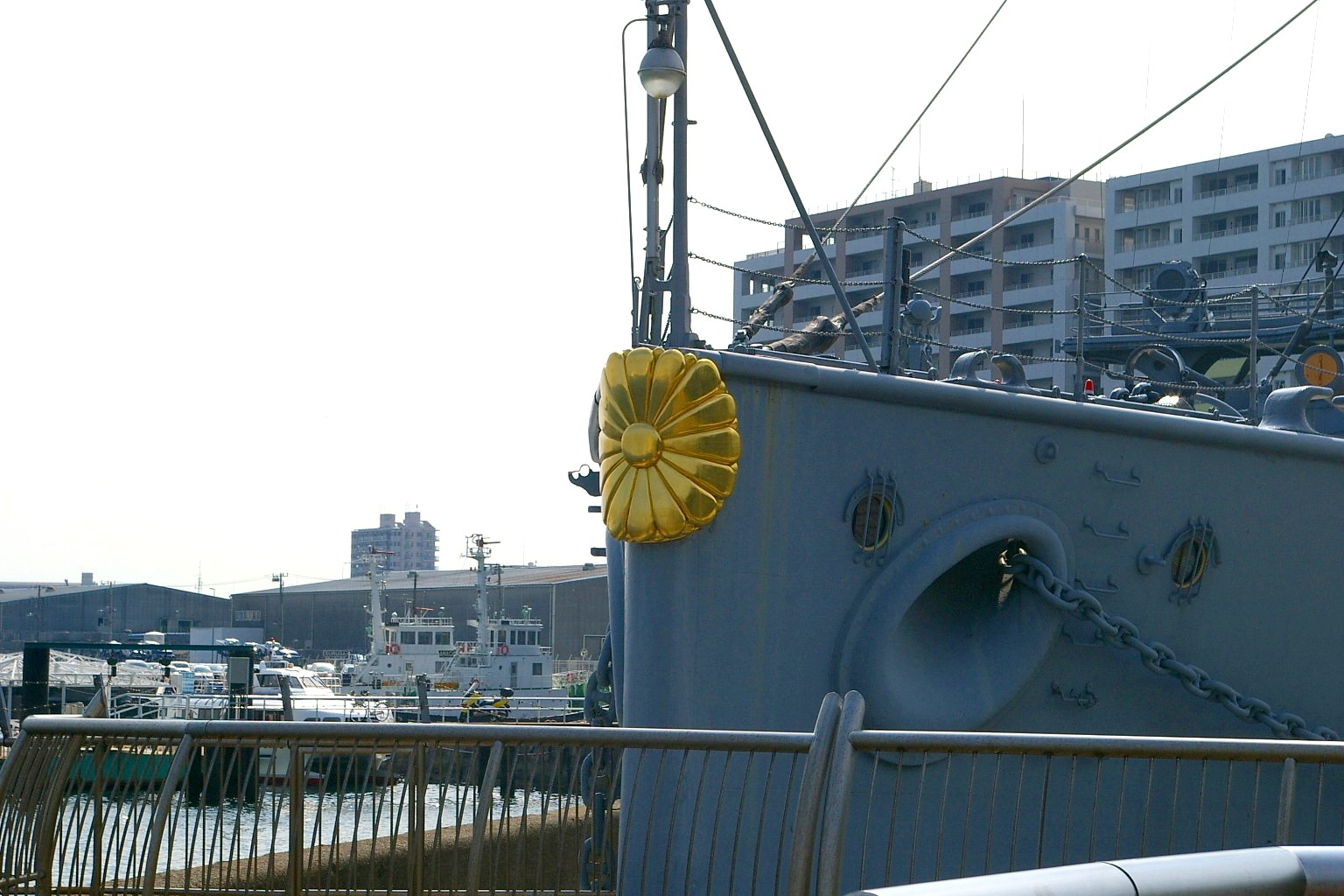
Bow of the battleship Mikasa

Imperial crest on an Order of the Garter banner when the Emperor is a member of the Order

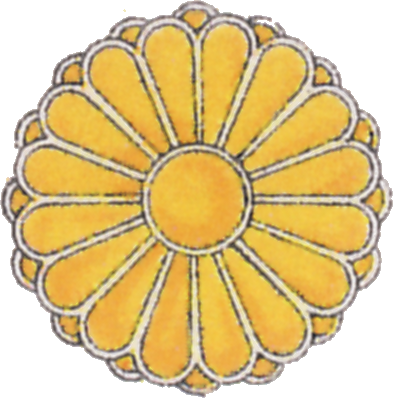
Imperial crest in Heraldischer Atlas (1899)

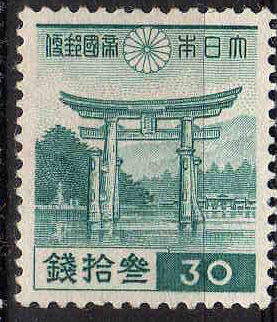
Miyajima postage stamp (1939)

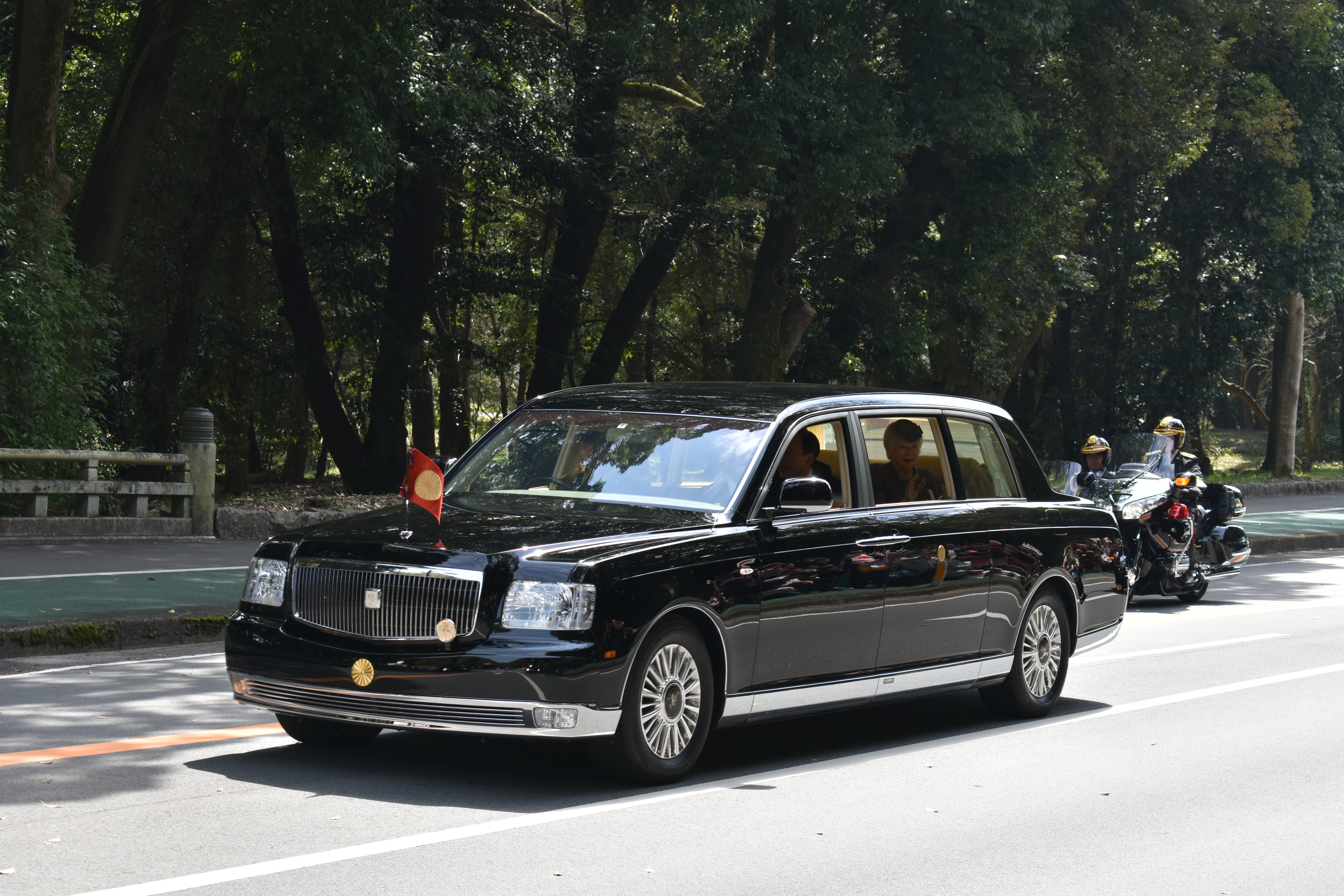
Imperial crest seen on a Toyota Century Royal, the state car of Japan

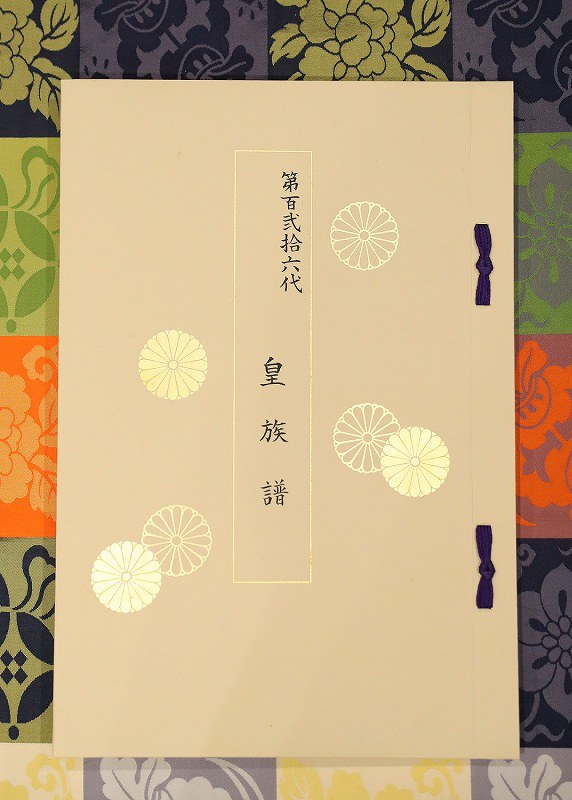
The imperial crest seen on the Imperial Household Register

== See also ==
- National emblems of Japan
- Chrysanthemum Throne
- Imperial Seal of Korea
- Imperial emblem of Manchukuo
- Order of the Chrysanthemum
- Mon (emblem)
