= Crosses in heraldry =

Cross symbols used in heraldry

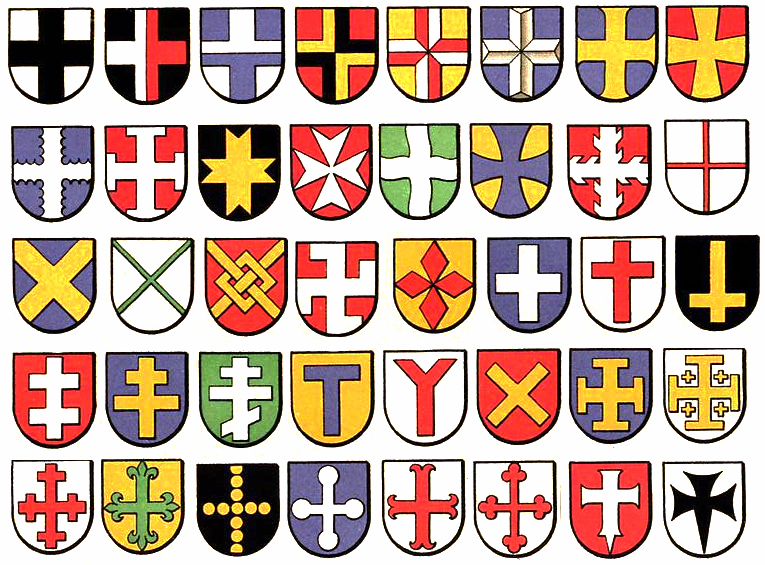
Collection of heraldic cross variants from Hugo Gerard Ströhl's Heraldischer Atlas

A number of cross symbols were developed for the purpose of the emerging system of heraldry, which appeared in Western Europe in about 1200. This tradition is partly in the use of the Christian cross an emblem from the 11th century, and increasingly during the age of the Crusades. Many cross variants were developed in the classical tradition of heraldry during the late medieval and early modern periods. Heraldic crosses are inherited in modern iconographic traditions and are used in numerous national flags.

== History ==
The Christian cross emblem (Latin cross or Greek cross) was used from the 5th century, deriving from a T-shape representing the gibbet (stauros, crux) of the crucifixion of Jesus in use from at least the 2nd century. The globus cruciger and the staurogram is used in Byzantine coins and seals during the Heraclian period (6th century). Under the Heraclian dynasty (7th century), coins also depict simply crosses potent, patty, or pommy.

The cross was used as a field sign by the Christian troops during the Crusades. In 1188, Kings Henry II of England and Philip II of France agreed to launch the Third Crusade together, and that Henry would use a white cross and Philip a red cross. The red-on-white cross came to be used by the Knights Templar, and the white-on-red one by the Knights Hospitaller (also white-on-black); the Teutonic Order used a black-on white version. Early cross or spiral-like shield decorations, not necessarily with Christian symbolism, are already found on depictions of shields of the 11th century.

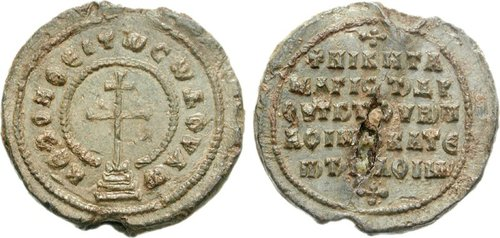
9th-century Byzantine seal showing a patriarchal cross (seal of Niketas, commander of the Byzantine imperial fleet)

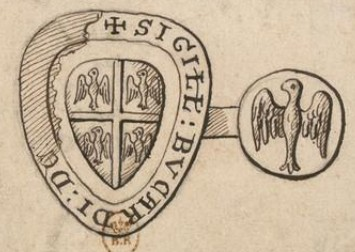
Seal of Bouchard de Marly (attested 1225), a cross, quarterly four alerions

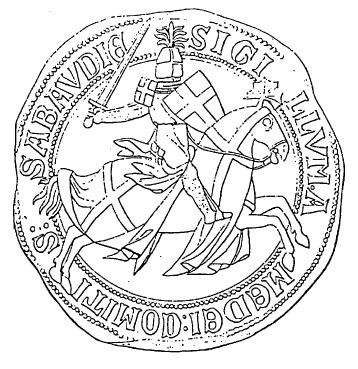
Seal of Amadeus V, Count of Savoy (1249–1323), showing a knight on horseback displaying the Savoy cross on his shield, ailets (shoulder-pads) and caparison (horse covering)

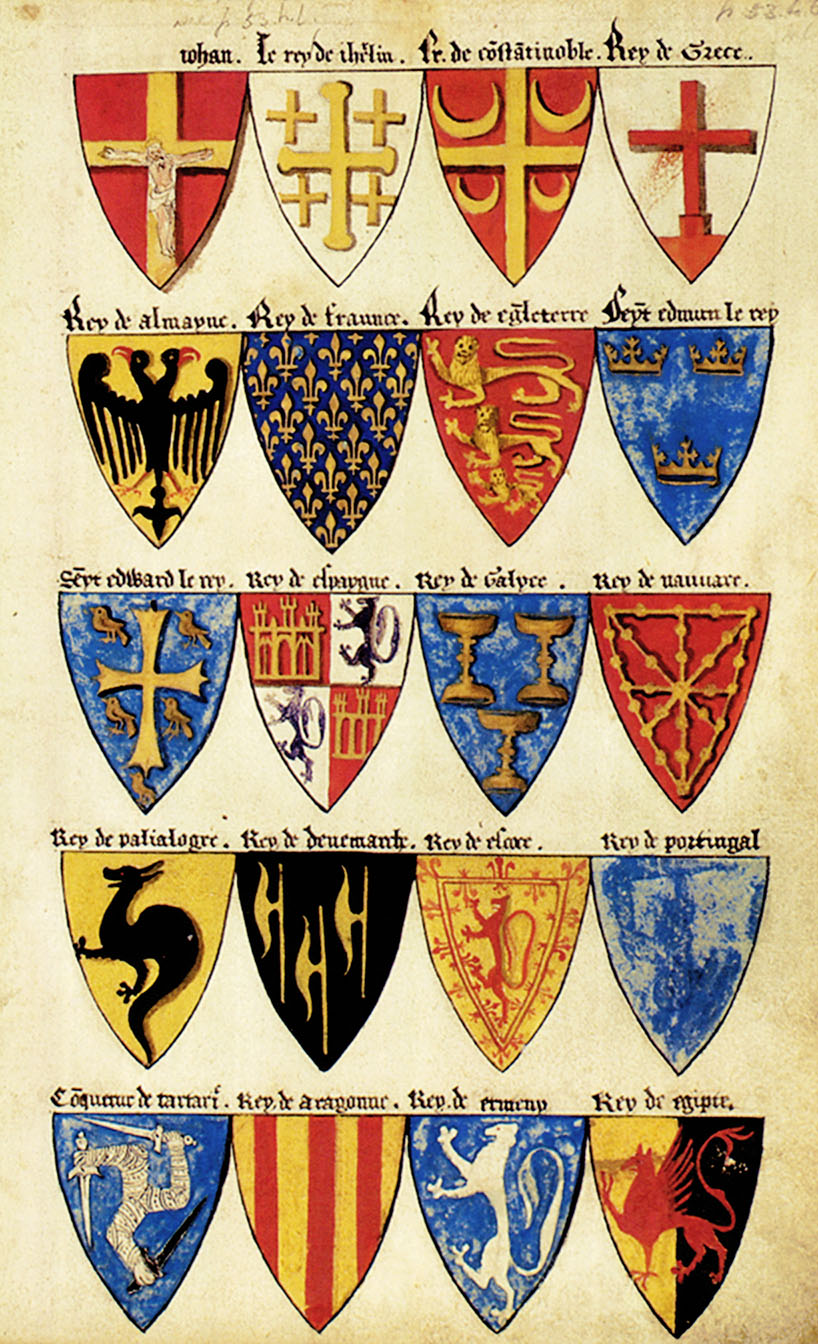
A section of Segar's Roll, a 17th-century copy of a late 13th-century English roll of arms. Crosses are shown on the arms of: the legendary Prester John (attributed arms showing a full crucifix including the figure of Christ), the King of Jerusalem (the Jerusalem cross), the Emperor of Constantinople (the Palaiologos dynasty emblem with the Betas interpreted as crescents), the "King of Greece", and King Edward the Confessor of England (attributed arms showing a cross and five martlets).

Heraldry emerged in western Europe at the start of the 13th century out of earlier traditions. The basic variants of the red-on-white (termed the Cross of Saint George) and the white-on-red crusaders' cross were continued independently in the flags of various states in the 13th and 14th century, including the Duchy of Genoa, the Electorate of Trier, the Bishopric of Constance and the Kingdoms of England and Georgia, which last two had special devotions to St George on one hand; and Savoy, the war flag of the Holy Roman Empire and (possibly from the latter) Switzerland and Denmark on the other.

The cross appears as heraldic charge in the oldest rolls of arms, from about 1250. A roll of arms of the 13th century (the reign of Henry III of England) lists the coats of arms of various noblemen distinguished by crosses of different tinctures:

- Le Conte de Norffolk, d'or a ung crois de goulez (viz. red on gold);
- Piers de Sauvoye, goules ung crois d'argent(white on red): this is attributed, Peter's funerary monument displays an eagle on his shield;
- Robert de Veer d'argent a la crois de goulz (red on white).

Glover's Roll (British Library Add MS 29796), a 16th-century copy of a roll of arms of the 1250s has depictions of various heraldic crosses, including the or a cross gules of the earl of Norfolk, gules, a cross argent of Peter of Savoy, argent a cross gules of Robert de Veer, gules a cross flory vair of Guillaume de Forz, Comte d'Aumale, gules a cross fleury argent of Guillaume Vescy, gules a cross saltire engrele of Fulke de Escherdestone, argent a cross fleury azure of John Lexington, azure three crosses or of William de Sarren, or a cross gules, five scallops argent of Ralph Bigod, gules a cross fourchy argent of Gilbert de Vale, argent a cross fleury sable of John Lamplowe, or a cross saltire gules, a chief gules of Robert de Brus, gules a cross saltire argent of Robert de Neville, or a cross voided gules of Hamond (Robert) de Crevecoeur, and azure a cross or, four lions rampant or of Baudouin Dakeney. In addition, the Glover Roll has semy of crosses crosslet as a tincture in several coats of arms.

The desire to distinguish one's coat of arms from others led to a period of substantial innovation in producing variants of the basic Christian cross by the early 14th century (in England, the reign of Edward II).

The great number of variants of crosses, and the deep history of such variants (going back to the 14th century or earlier) results in confusing and often contradictory terminology.

In the heraldry of the Holy Roman Empire, the cross is comparatively rare in the coats of arms of noble families, presumably because the plain heraldic cross was seen as an imperial symbol (for the same reason, the eagle was rarely used as a charge because it represented the empire), but in the 14th century the plain cross is used in the seals and flags of several prince-bishoprics, including Trier, Constance and Cologne.

Looking back on the Crusades as the foundational period of knighthood, the badge of the cross became strongly associated with the idealized Christian knight of romance, as expressed by Spenser (Faerie Queene book 1, canto 1):

And on his brest a bloodie crosse he bore,
The deare remembrance of his dying Lord,
For whose sweete sake that glorious badge he wore,
And dead, as living ever, his ador'd:
Upon his shield the like was also scor'd.

The black-on-white cross worn by the Teutonic Knights was granted by Innocent III in 1205. The coat of arms representing the grand master (Deutschmeisterwappen) is shown with a golden cross fleury or cross potent superimposed on the black cross, with the imperial eagle as a central inescutcheon. The golden cross fleury overlaid on the black cross becomes widely used in the 15th century. A legendary account attributes its introduction to Louis IX of France, who on 20 August 1250 granted the master of the order this cross as a variation of the Jerusalem cross, with the fleur-de-lis symbol attached to each arm. While this legendary account cannot be traced back further than the early modern period (Christoph Hartknoch, 1684) there is some evidence that the design does indeed date to the mid 13th century. The black cross patty was later used for military decoration and insignia by the Kingdom of Prussia and gave rise to the cross patty in the German Reichskriegsflagge and the Iron Cross and Pour le Mérite orders.

The Nordic cross is an 18th-century innovation derived from cross flags adapted as swallow-tailed (or triple-tailed) pennons used as civil ensigns; the first official introduction of such a flag was in a regulation of 11 June 1748 describing the Danish civil ensign (Koffardiflaget) for merchant ships. The Danish design was adopted for the flags of Norway (civil ensign 1821) and Sweden (1906), both derived from a common ensign used during the Union between Sweden and Norway 1818–1844, Iceland (1915) and Finland (1917).

== Ordinary cross ==
The blazon Cross without any addition signifies a heraldic ordinary, a pale and a fess of equal widths conjoined, the width being typically one-fifth of the shield (or one third of the shield when charges are placed on the cross). The four arms should be of equal length (forming a Greek cross), as far as possible within the shape of the shield, and they meet in the center (fesse-point) of the shield, except when it is abased (lowered) in the presence of a chief. The plain cross of gules in a field argent is termed Saint George's Cross.

The ordinary formed when the cross' arms are oblique, passing through the top corners of the shield, is referred to as a saltire.

The ordinary cross may further be modify in its flection (i.e. modification of its edges as engrailed (engreslée), embattled (bretessée), indented (denchée), invected (cannelée), wavy, (ondée), raguly (écotée), dancetty or dantelly (denché, émanchée), and so on. French heraldic terminology is even more diverse, with many synonyms leading to some confusion.

Gules a cross argent (Savoy)

Gules a saltire argent (Neville)

Or a cross per fess gules and azure

Vert a cross ermine, in each quarter a pale gules (Dinard)

Sable a cross engrailed or

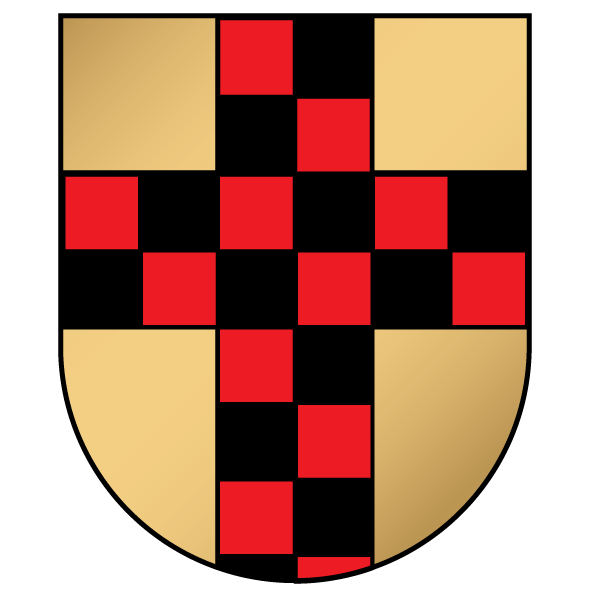
Or [tenné] a cross chequy gules and sable

Argent a saltire engrailed azure

Azure a saltire embattled parted [voided] or (John Allen-Petrie)

Or a cross patty throughout sable

The ordinary cross may also be varied in its tincture, it may be party, or chequy, compony, counter-compony, fretty, trellised, vair maçonnée and so on. It may also be of two tinctures, e.g. party per fesse, per pale, or per cross (equivalent to quarterly), mostly in connection with the partition of the field (i.e. counter-charged).

The term quarter-pierced (quarterly pierced) is used when the center of the cross has a separate tincture. Some heraldists have used quarter-voided or square-pierced for cases where the center of the cross is given the tincture of the field, or alternatively chequy of nine panes (French équipollée). A cross quadrate has a square at the intersection point.

Argent a cross azure pierced of the field

Argent a cross vert quarter pierced of the field

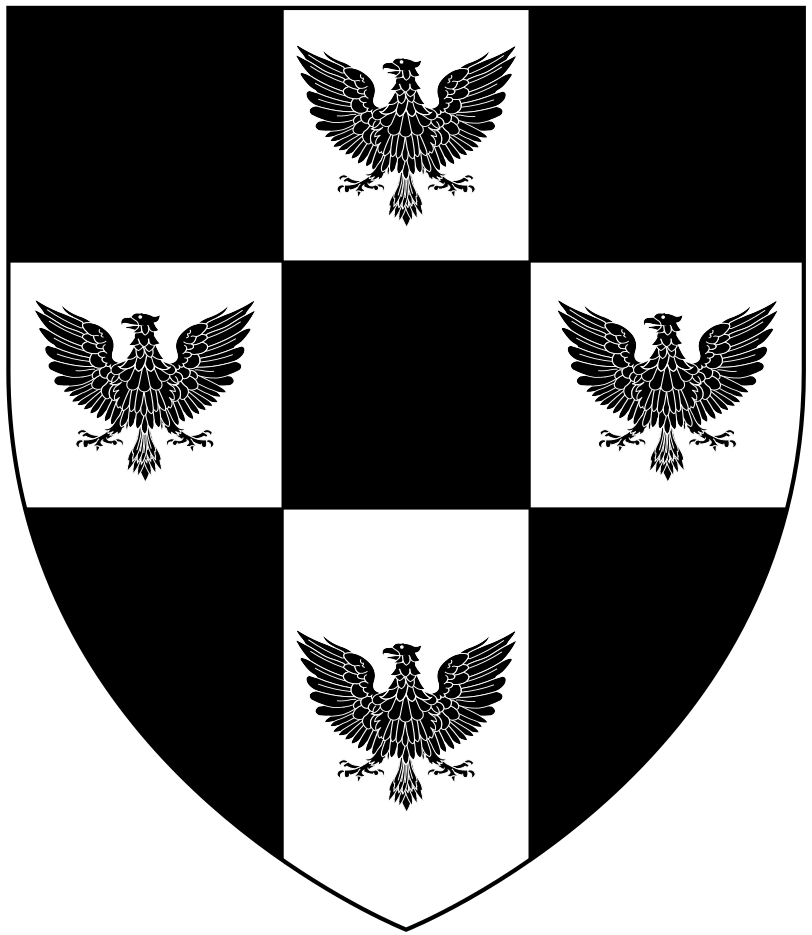
Sable on a cross argent quarter pierced of the field four eagles displayed of the first (Buller)

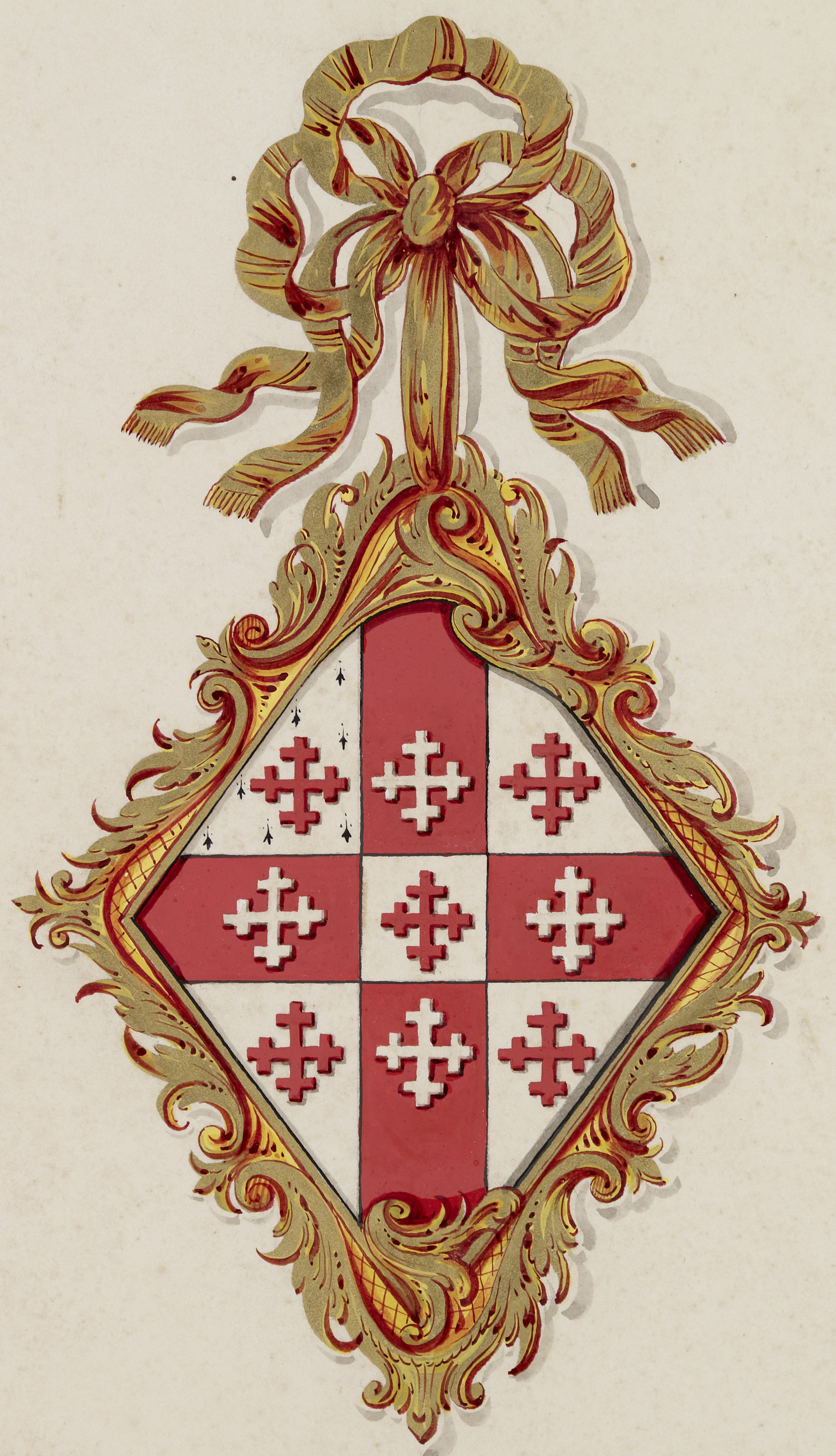
Argent a cross gules quarterly pierced nine crosses crosslet, three, three, and three counterchanged (the first quarter ermine for distinction) (Mary Ann Harvey Bonnell 1841)

The cross voided (also une fausse croix) has the same tincture of the field with only a narrow border outlining the limbs. This is equivalent to superimposing one cross upon another (croix chargée, or remplie) when the second cross is of the tincture of the field.

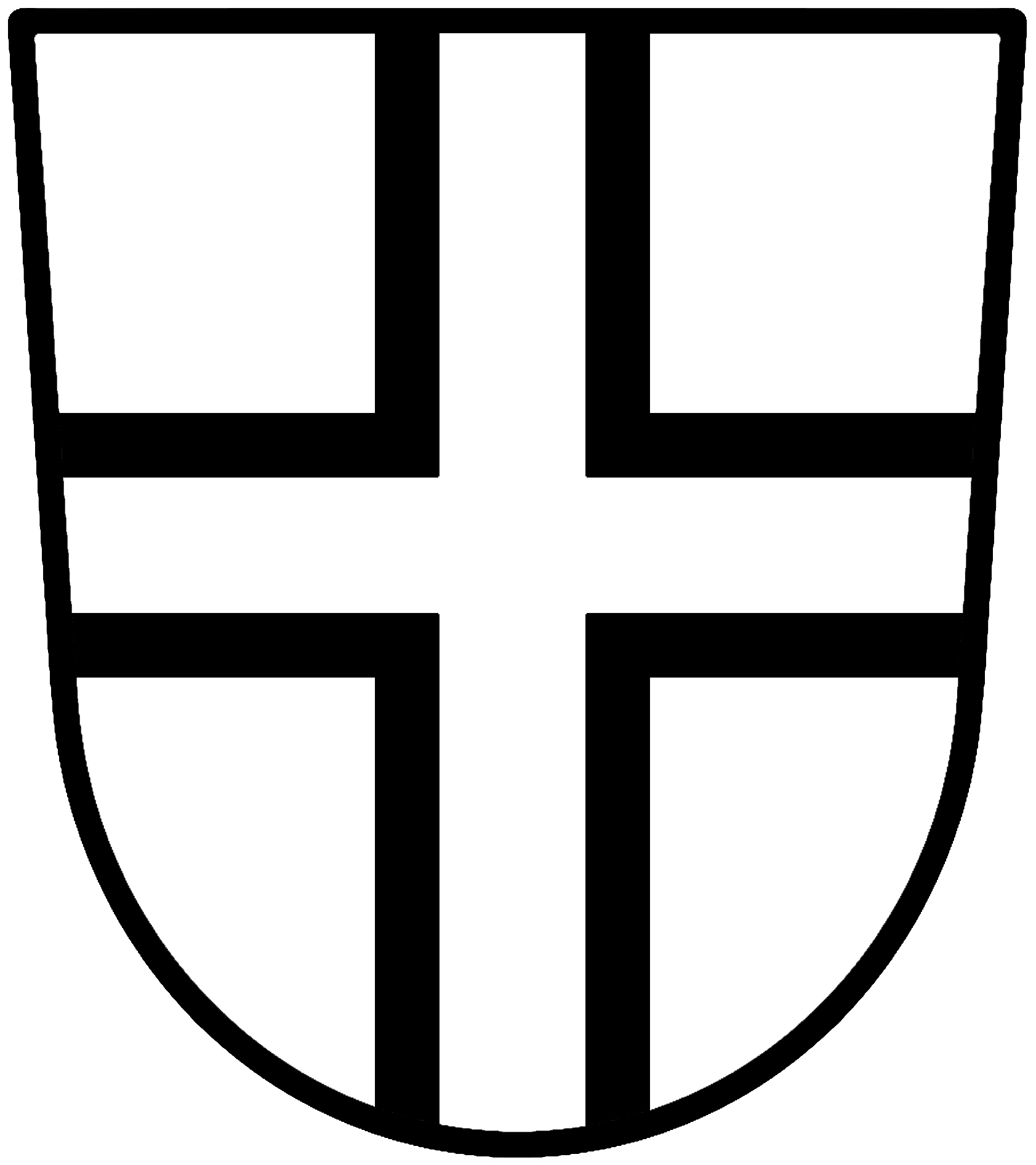
Argent a cross voided sable

Or a cross triple parted vert

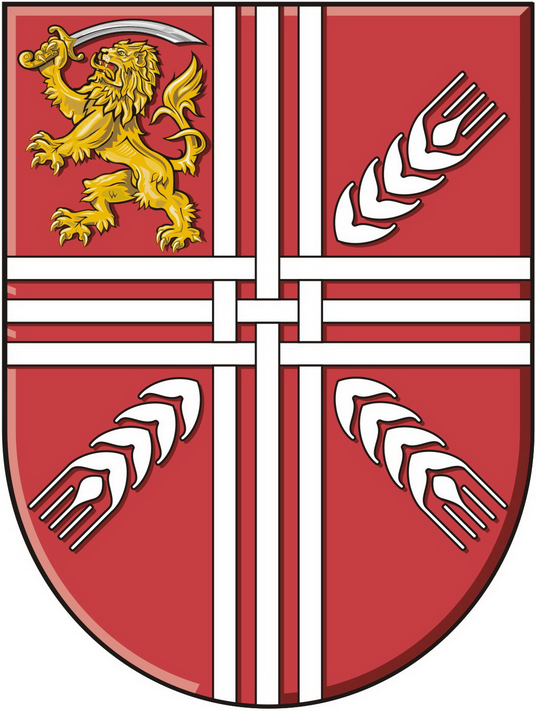
A cross triple parted fretted in the municipal coat of arms of Nova Crnja (Serbia)

A saltire triple parted fretted in the municipal Coat of arms of Hjelmeland (Norway)

A voided cross might also be blazoned as fimbriated. Fimbriated crosses are more common in vexillology, e.g. the fimbriated crosses in the national flags of the United Kingdom, of Norway and of Iceland. The German Balkenkreuz, introduced originally as identification for German Luftstreitkräfte in 1918 and later used as a vehicle emblem by the Wehrmacht, if used heraldically might be blazoned as a cross double fimbriated, or as a voided cross superimposed by a second cross. The "Bundeswehr cross" is a variant of the Balkenkreuz using a cross patty.

== Named variants ==
=== Equal limbs ===
Picture	Name	Description
	Cross hummetty (couped, alaisée, alésée)	When the ordinary cross is couped it acquires aspects of a charge (rather than an ordinary), i.e. a Greek cross with equal limbs.
	Cross pattée (patty, formée, formy)	A cross pattée (or formée/formy) has arms narrowing towards the centre, but with flat ends. It is usually found with curved inside edges as in the 13th c. arms of Baron Berkeley (see also Iron Cross); but sometimes encountered with straight edges (triangular arms). A cross pattée must be blazoned as throughout or fixed (passant), if it is intended that the four arms of the cross should reach to the edges of the shield.
	Cross potent	This cross has a crossbar at the end of each of its arms. "Potent" is an old word for a crutch, and is used in heraldic terminology to describe a T shape.
	Cross cercelée (recercely)	A cross recercely seems to be a cross moline parted or voided throughout—though it may be a cross moline very curly.
	Cross moline (anchory)	In a cross moline, the ends of the arms are bifurcated, split and curved back, also called a cross ancré or anchory. As a mark of cadency in English and Canadian heraldry, it marks an eighth son. Found in the coats of arms of Molyneux and of the House of Broglie.
	Cross fourchy (fourchée)	One form of the heraldic cross fourchy or cross fourche (croix fourchée meaning "forked"). An example is the South African Postal Association
	Maltese cross	With arms which narrow towards the center, and are indented at the ends, also known as the eight-pointed cross (with no curved lines). This is a gradual evolution of the eight-pointed cross moline. The sharp vertex of the modern "four-arrowhead" design is gradual, and takes place during the 15th to 16th century. The "Rhodian cross" of the early 16th century had almost, but not quite, achieved the "sharp arrowhead appearance". The modern form is known as the Maltese cross for its use by the Sovereign Military Order of Malta.
	Cross crosslet	A cross with the ends of each arm crossed. A prominent early example is in the arms of the Beauchamp earls of Warwick. In early armory it is not always distinguished from a cross bottony. A variant is the cross crosslet double crossed, with two bars crossing each arm, as in the arms of Robert Willoughby, 1st Baron Willoughby de Broke (d.1502) sculpted on his tomb at Callington Church, Cornwall. The religious symbol of Latvian religion Dievturība called a krustu krusts in Latvian.
	Cross bottony (trefly)	A cross with the ends of the arms bottony (or botonny, i.e. "furnished with knobs or buttons"), i.e. shaped like a trefoil—and so it is sometimes called a cross trefly. In early armory it is not always distinguished from a cross crosslet. It occurs counterchanged on the flag of Maryland; a saltire botonny can be seen in the coat and flag of the Village of New Maryland, New Brunswick; and a Latin cross trefly can be seen in the coat of Isidore Popowych, it also appears in the canton of the arms and flag of the Episcopal Church, where it is blazoned as "cross crosslet".
	Cross fleury (flory)	A cross whose arms end in fleurs-de-lys—as in the coats of arms of the Municipalité de la Paroisse de Saint-Philémon in Canada and the Borough of Woking in England. In early armory it was not consistently distinguished from the cross patoncé. A version of the cross flory is used by the Romanian Order of Michael the Brave. Another version, the "Cross of Saint Julian" (Cruz de San Julián) is a special form of the cross fleury used by the Spanish Order of Alcántara, Order of Calatrava and Order of Montesa.
	Cross patoncé	A cross patoncé (or patonce) is more or less intermediate between a cross pattée and a cross flory (or fleury). The ends of its limbs are trifurcated into leaf shapes, and seems to come in two sorts: one where the limbs are the same width all along as in the coat of Godfrey McCance Gransden; and the other where the limbs gently widen from the centre (but do not curve) as in the coat of John Chiu] (both of Canada). A medieval example is shown on the seal of William de Fortibus (d.1260). The name is derived from French patte d'once (“ounce's paw”).
	Cross pommy	A cross pommy (croix pommée) has a round knob at the end of each arm, as in the coat of Penwith District Council, England. The name is derived from French pommé, "grown round like an apple."
	Cross gamma (gammate, cramponny)	Upright cross with truncated angled arms; essentially a variant of the swastika; uncommon, but can be found in the arms of Gordon of Hallhead. Also known as a cross cramponny or cramponée, a fylfot, a gammate or gammadion cross, or tetragammadion, as it were combining four capital Greek letters Γ (gamma).
	Cross barby	In the coat of Tillie in Cornwall. The symbol is also called a "barbed cross" or an "arrow cross". An arrow cross in green was also the symbol of the Arrow Cross Party of Hungary.
	Cross erminée	A cross erminée is a cross of four ermine-spots, with the heads meeting, sharing their spots. Historically borne by Hurston (Cheshire, England) c. 1490 and others
	Avellane cross	A form of cross which resembles four hazel filberts in their husks or cases, joined at the great end. The term comes from the Latin name for the hazel, originally Nux avellana. It was fairly rare in English heraldry.
	Order of Christ Cross	A form of cross which resembling a mix between a cross pattée or the cross potent. Also known as a "Portuguese Cross", it is associated with the Portuguese discoveries. It is fairly common in Portuguese heraldry and Brazilian heraldry.
	Occitan Cross	A cross chiefly used as a symbol of Occitania.

=== Unequal limbs ===
Picture	Name	Description
	Latin cross	The Latin cross has an elongated lower limb. Media related to Latin crosses in heraldry at Wikimedia Commons
	Cross of Saint Peter	The inverted Latin cross is known as the Cross of Saint Peter. Media related to Cross of Saint Peter in heraldry at Wikimedia Commons
	Cross of Saint Philip	The sideways Latin cross is associated with Philip the Apostle.
	Cross portate	The oblique Latin cross, known as cross portate ("carried"), is associated with Saint Gilbert of Sempringham.
	Calvary cross	A Latin cross standing on steps (mostly three in number) is known as Calvary cross. Media related to Calvary cross in heraldry at Wikimedia Commons
	Cross fitchy	A cross fitchy has the lower limb pointed, as if to be driven into the ground. From French fiché, "fixed."
	Cross pattée fitchée	A cross pattée fitchée is a cross pattée with a sharp point added to the lower limb, as if for use in staking into the ground
	Cross fleury fitchy (Cross of Saint James)	A special form of the cross flory fitchy is used by the order of Santiago. Also found in the Scottish arms of Mulino from Venezuela and in the coats of Santa Cruz de Tenerife, Spain; and Caracas, Venezuela; Santiago de Tete, Mozambique.
	Cross crosslet fitchy	Shown here is a cross crosslet fitchy, a very frequent charge in British and French armory, appearing in the arms of the House of Howard, the Marquess of Ailsa, the Earl Cathcart, Macpherson of Cluny, Rattray of that Ilk, among many others. This is probably the most common form of the cross fitchy but others do exist, such as the crosses formy fitchy found between the antlers of the stag supporters of South Buckinghamshire District Council, England.
	Patriarchal cross	The patriarchal cross or double cross was used in Byzantine seals since the early medieval period. It was adopted in the coat of arms of Hungary in the late 12th century, and also appears on the more recent coat of arms of Slovakia.
	Two-barred cross	A Latin cross with an extra bar added. The lengths and placement of the bars (or "arms") vary, and most of the variations are interchangeably called either of the cross of Lorraine, the patriarchal cross, the Orthodox cross or the archiepiscopal cross. It appears in the arms of the Jagiellonian dynasty, which itself appears in the modern arms of Lithuania.

=== Additional charges ===
In some cases, a separate name is given to the ensemble of a heraldic cross with four additional charges in the angles.

Picture	Name	Description
	Cross-and-crosslets (a cross potent between four plain crosslets); Jerusalem cross)	The symbol of the Crusader Kingdom of Jerusalem, which existed for almost two hundred years after the First Crusade; in the rendering at left, the large cross is shown slightly "potent" (i.e., with T-shaped ends), but that is not always the case. The four smaller crosses are said to symbolize either the four books of the Gospel or the four directions in which the Word of Christ spread from Jerusalem. Alternatively, all five crosses can symbolize the five wounds of Christ during the Passion. This symbol is used in the flag of Georgia. Also found in the coat of arms of the Papal Equestrian Order of the Holy Sepulchre of Jerusalem, Vatican City (matriculated in Scotland as "Argent; a Jerusalem cross cantoned between four crosses couped, gules"—Scots Public Register, volume 75, page 112)—to be seen at various EOHSJ websites; also in the Canadian coat of Robert Gerald Guest (Canadian Public Register Volume III, page 85).
	Tetragrammatic cross	A Greek cross with the letter beta (Β) in each of its angles, which represent the imperial motto of the Palaiologos dynasty (mid-13th century, βασιλεὺς βασιλέων, βασιλεύων βασιλευόντων - Basileus Basileōn, Basileuōn Basileuontōn "King of Kings, Ruling Over Kings"). The Serbian cross variant (Само Слога Србина Спашава - Only Unity Saves The Serbs) with four "firesteel" shapes develops in the early modern Illyrian Armorials.

== Flags ==
Depiction of St George's Flag used alongside the Royal Standard by Wat Tyler's rebels in Froissart's Chronicles (c. 1470)

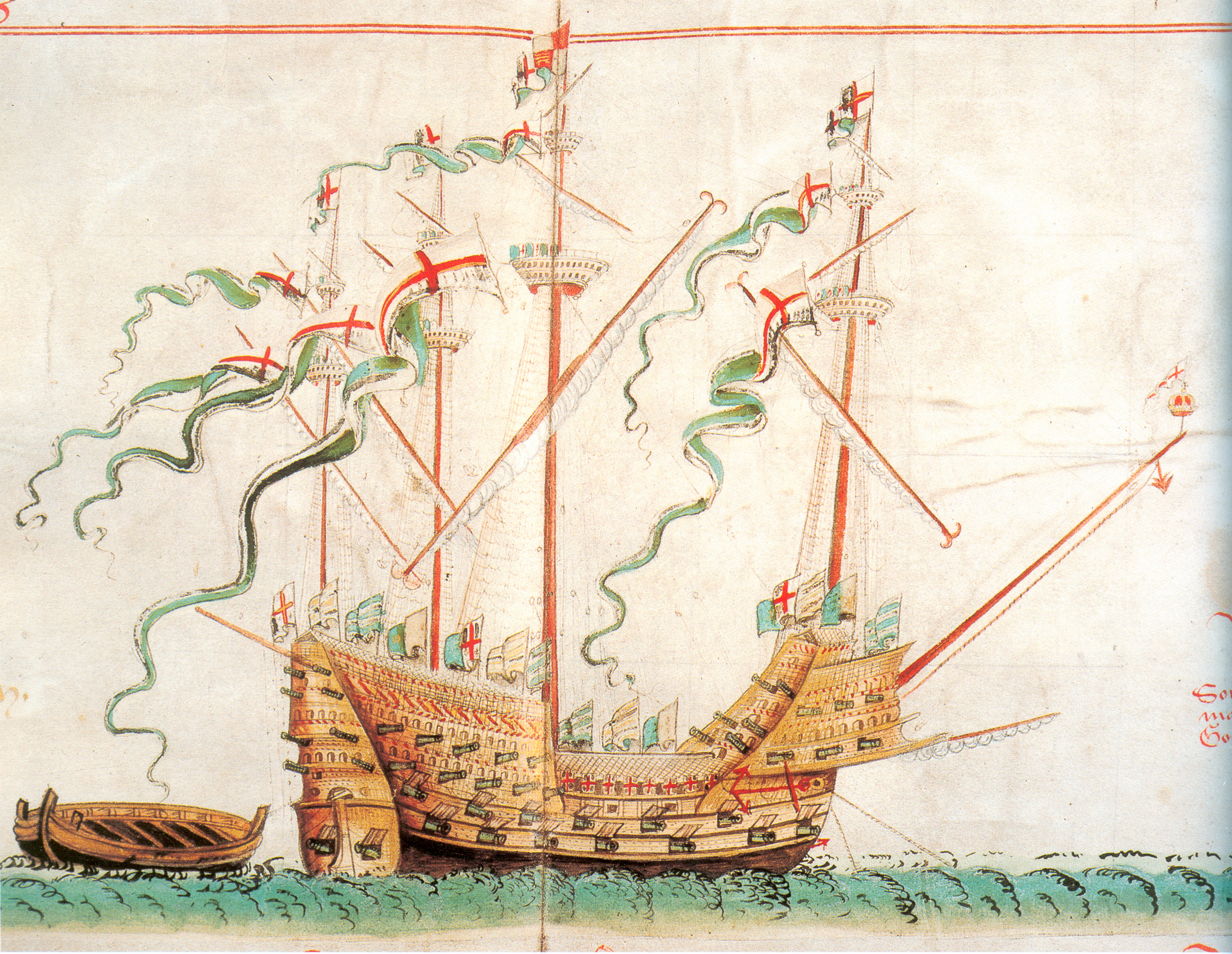
The Tudor navy carrack Henry Grace à Dieu (launched 1514) as depicted in the 1546 Anthony Roll, with streamers showing St George's Cross

Flags with crosses are recorded from the later Middle Ages, e.g. in the early 14th century the insignia cruxata comunis of the city of Genoa, the red-on-white cross that would later become known as St George's Cross, and the white-on-red cross of the Reichssturmfahne used as the war flag of the Holy Roman Emperor possibly from the early 13th century.

Crosses on flags become more widespread in the Age of Sail, as maritime flags, and from this tradition develop into national flags in the 18th to 19th century, the British Union flag (as naval flag) was introduced in 1606, after the Union of the Crowns. The Nordic cross is a modern cross variant used on rectangular flags only, introduced for rectangular civil ensigns for Denmark in 1748. This is to be distinguished from the (rare) heraldic charge of a horizontal Latin cross, known as the "Cross of Saint Philip".

Several national flags are based on late medieval war flags, including the white-on-red crosses of the flag of Denmark and the flag of Switzerland. The elongated Nordic cross originates in the 18th century due to the rectangular shape of maritime flags.

The Red Cross flag originates in 1906 as a colour-switched version of the flag of Switzerland.

== See also ==
- St. Andrew's Cross
- Fillet (heraldry)
