= Arthur Charles Fox-Davies =

British expert on heraldry

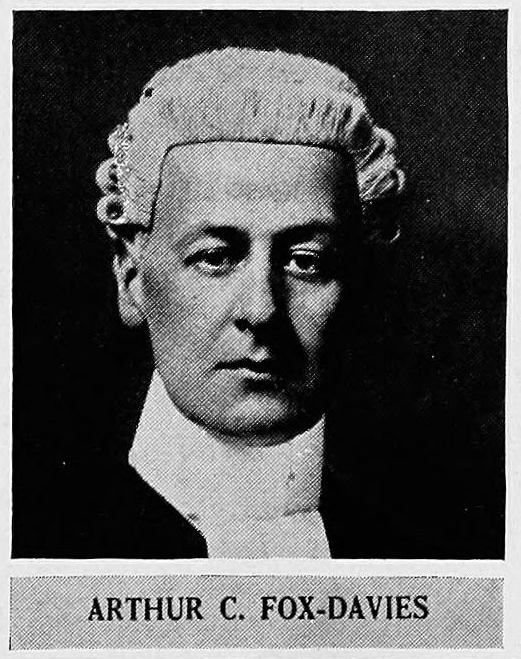
- Born: 28 February 1871; Bristol, England
- Died: 19 May 1928 (aged 57); London, England
- Occupations: Author; barrister
- Notable work: Complete Guide to Heraldry (1909)

Arthur Charles Fox-Davies (28 February 1871 – 19 May 1928) was a British expert on heraldry. His Complete Guide to Heraldry, published in 1909, has become a standard work on heraldry in England. A barrister by profession, Fox-Davies worked on several notable cases involving the peerage, and also worked as a journalist and novelist. (Note: Quoted: "Fox-Davies" → Armorial Families: A Directory of Gentleman of Coat-Armour. Vol. 1 (of 2) (7th ed.). London: Hurst and Blackett, Ltd. 1929. p. 716 – via Internet Archive (Boston Public Library).)

== Biography ==
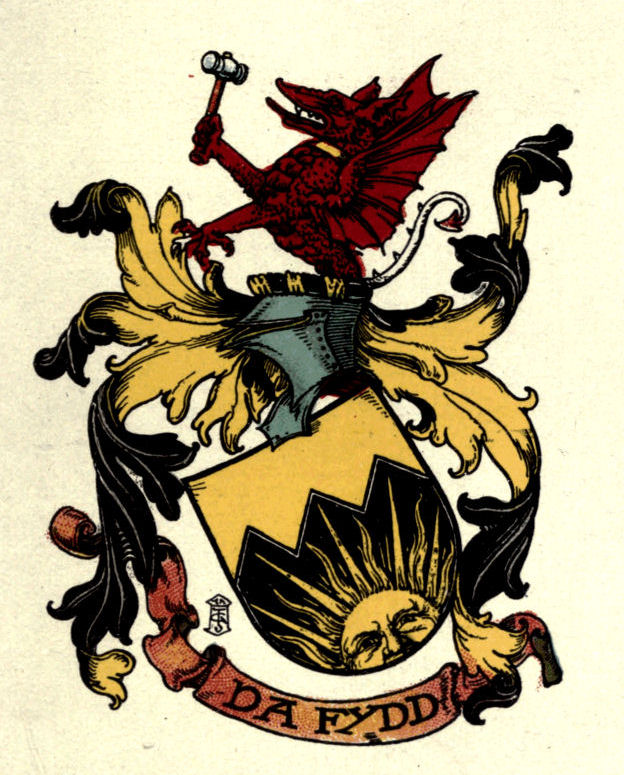
Fox-Davies's arms, as illustrated in his Complete Guide to Heraldry

Arthur Charles Davies (known as Charlie) was born in Bristol, the second son of Thomas Edmond Davies (1839–1908) and his wife Maria Jane Fox, the daughter and co-heiress of alderman John Fox, JP. Fox-Davies was brought up from the early 1880s at Coalbrookdale in Shropshire, where his father worked for the Coalbrookdale Iron Company and had a house called "Paradise" which became his home in much of his adult life; his grandfather, Charles Davies of Cardigan in Wales, had been an ironmonger. He added his mother's maiden name to his own by deed poll on his nineteenth birthday in 1890, thereby changing his surname from Davies to Fox-Davies. In 1894, his father took the same course for himself and the rest of the family.

Fox-Davies attended Ackworth School in Yorkshire, but was expelled in 1884 at the age of fourteen, after hitting one of the schoolmasters. He received no further formal education, but was admitted to Lincoln's Inn in 1901 and called to the bar in 1906. As a barrister, he practised on the South Eastern Circuit, at the Old Bailey, and at the Surrey and South London Sessions. He also prepared printed cases for peerage cases in the House of Lords.

He married in 1901 Mary Ellen Blanche Crookes (1870–1935), daughter and coheiress of Septimus Wilkinson Crookes and Anne Blanche Harriet Proctor. They had a son, Harley Edmond Fitzroy Fox-Davies (1907–1941), and a daughter, Moyra de Somery Regan. His wife worked as an heraldic artist, often for her husband's publications, under the pseudonym "C. Helard".

Neither the Fox nor the Davies families were armigerous, so in 1905, when Fox-Davies was 34 and already well-advanced in his career as a writer on heraldic and genealogical subjects, he organised posthumous grants of arms to both his grandfathers. The arms granted to Charles Davies were sable, a demi sun in splendour issuant in base or, a chief dancetée of the last, with, for crest, "a demi dragon rampant gules collared or, holding in the dexter claw a hammer proper"; those granted to John Fox were "per pale argent and gules, three foxes sejant counterchanged", with, for crest, a demi stag winged gules collared argent.

Fox-Davies bore the Davies arms with a crescent for cadency, and intended to quarter them with the Fox arms after his mother's death; but as she outlived him, dying in 1937, this was not possible. He also considered obtaining grants to his wife's families of Crookes and Proctor, which would have entitled his children to additional quarterings, but at this point he no longer had the money for further grants of arms. He did obtain, in 1921, the grant of a badge, which consisted of a crown vallary gules. His motto was Da Fydd, Welsh for "good faith" and a pun on the name Davies.

In addition to his writings on heraldry, he published a number of works of fiction, including detective stories such as The Dangerville Inheritance (1907), The Mauleverer Murders (1907) and The Duplicate Death (1910). He authored the article on "Heraldry" in the Catholic Encyclopedia.

Politically Conservative, Fox-Davies "quite hopelessly" stood for election as a member of parliament for Merthyr Tydfil in 1910, 1923 and 1924. He was, however, elected as a member of Holborn Borough Council in London.

Fox-Davies lived at 65 Warwick Gardens in Kensington, London, and had chambers at 23, Old Buildings, Lincoln's Inn. He died, aged 57, of portal hypertension and cirrhosis of the liver, having lain ill in his home for several weeks. He was buried at the parish church of Holy Trinity in Coalbrookdale.

== Heraldic writings ==
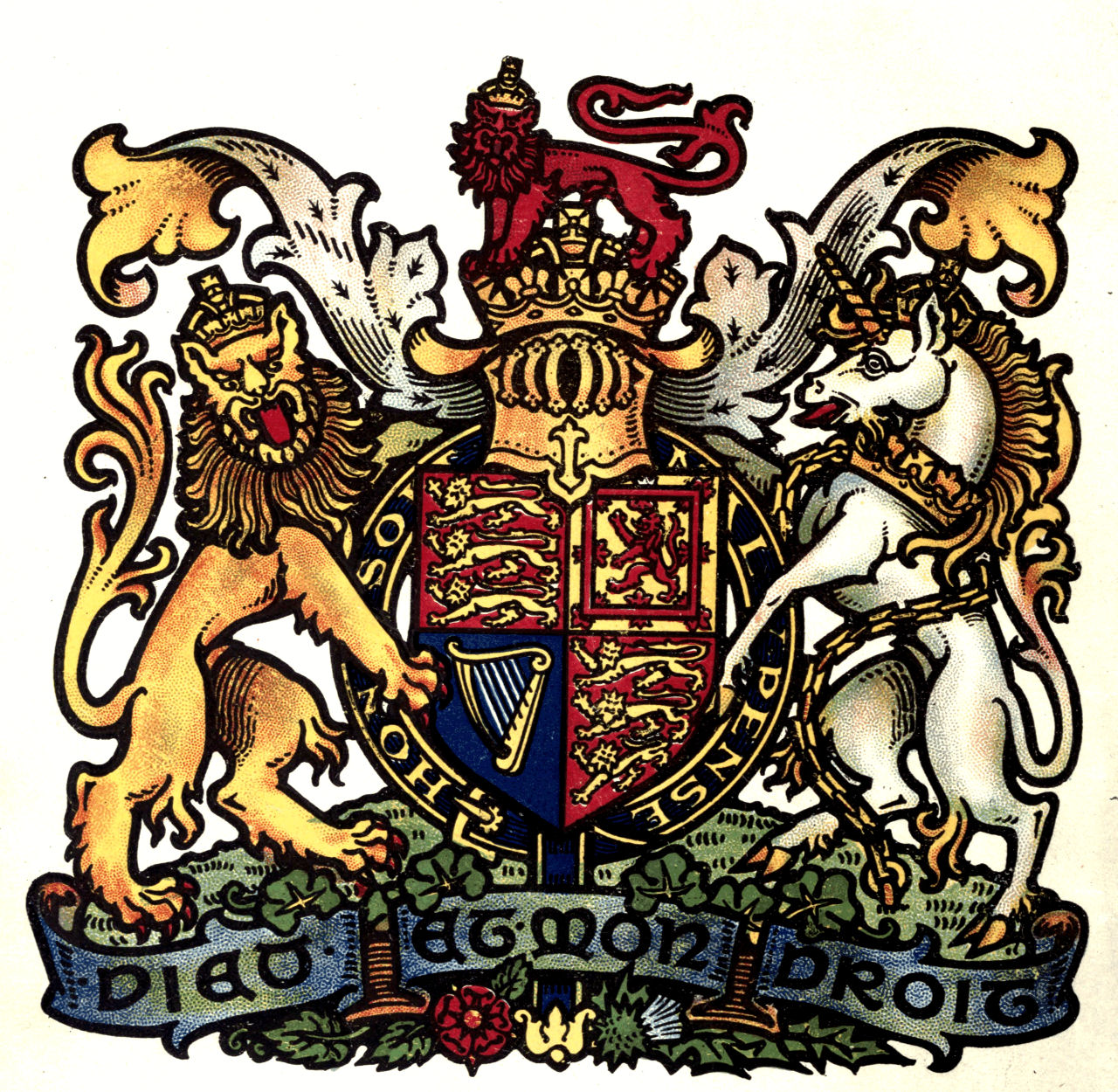
The Royal Arms as depicted in The Art of Heraldry

Fox-Davies's writing on heraldry is characterised by a passionate attachment to heraldry as art and history and also as law. He was something of a polemicist, and issued one of his most controversial works, The Right to Bear Arms, under the pseudonym X. However, he always supported his arguments with specific historical and manuscript evidence.

He was the editor of the Genealogical Magazine from 1895 to 1906.

He conducted a lifelong campaign against the bearing of coats of arms without lawful authority in accordance with the Law of Arms, whether that authority was a right recognised at the visitations conducted by heralds in the 16th and 17th centuries or, more commonly, a right deriving from a specific grant entered in the records of the College of Arms. In support of this campaign, he produced a directory which attempted to list all living bearers of arms in England and Wales who could prove such authority, under the title Armorial Families. This served as an incentive to families who had not got such authority to regularise their position at the College of Arms and the size of the work increased considerably until its final edition in 1929, which remains the most comprehensive published record (the records of the College of Arms being largely unpublished) of post-Victorian heraldry in Britain. Many of the arms were illustrated with specially commissioned heraldic drawings, and Fox-Davies drew on this large resource when illustrating his more systematic treatises on heraldry.

The most lavish of these was The Art of Heraldry: An Encyclopædia of Armory, which was originally conceived as an English translation of a German publication (Ströhl's Heraldischer Atlas) but which was transformed, in Fox-Davies's hands, into a largely original work specifically directed to the history, theory and practice of English heraldry, with illustrations in black and white and in colour throughout. This large 500-page book was first published in 1904 and was re-issued in black and white only in 1976 by an American publisher and in 1986 in colour by a London publisher. Much of the material in this book was re-used in a shorter, cheaper and more popular exposition of contemporary English heraldic practice, A Complete Guide to Heraldry, which proved very successful and influential. This too has been reprinted several times. Even the still shorter Heraldry Explained balanced a clear and didactic text with plentiful illustration.

Fox-Davies's emphasis on practical and officially authorised heraldry caused him to showcase mostly recent grants of arms. This was in contrast to the medieval emphasis of other scholars, of whom his most prominent critics were Oswald Barron, author of the celebrated article on heraldry in the 1911 edition of the Encyclopædia Britannica, and Horace Round.

Round, in an essay called "Heraldry and the Gent" (eventually published in his collection Peerage and Pedigree), ridiculed another thesis with which Fox-Davies was particularly associated, namely, that an English grant of arms was equivalent to a continental patent of nobility, and that, not only were all English armigers to that extent noblemen as well as gentlemen (if male), but that no one without an official right to bear a coat of arms could claim to be a gentleman at all.

Fox-Davies's influence on English heraldry continued long after his death in 1928, not least because of his lawyerly insistence on backing his opinions with solid evidence, and because of the continuing popularity of his books with the general public and with expert heraldists alike. One of his admirers in the next generation was John Brooke-Little, Norroy and Ulster King of Arms and founder of the Heraldry Society, who edited a new edition of The Complete Guide to Heraldry and in many ways propagated similar, albeit somewhat less aggressively expressed, ideas.

Fox-Davies never served as a herald or pursuivant at the College of Arms, but he was one of the 250 Gold Staff Officers who assisted at the coronation of King George V.

=== Publications ===
As editor

- Fairbairn's Book of Crests of the Families of Great Britain and Ireland. Edinburgh: T.C. & E.C. Jack. Retrieved March 7, 2025.
1. "Revised and Brought Down to the Present Date by Author Charles Fox-Davies".
2. Vol 1. 1892 – via HathiTrust Cornell.
3. Vol 2. 1892 – via HathiTrust Cornell.
- Dod's Peerage.
- Burke's Landed Gentry.
- Genealogical Magazine: A Journal of Family History, Heraldry, and Pedigrees (monthly). Vol. 1 (May 1897) thru Vol. 8 (July 1904). London: Elliot Stock. 1897–1904. OCLC 1125387825 (all editions).
1. Vol. 1. 1898 – via Internet Archive (Harold B. Lee Library).
2. Vol. 2. 1899 – via Internet Archive (Harold B. Lee Library).
3. Vol. 3. 1900 – via Internet Archive (Allen County).
4. Vol. 4. 1901 – via Internet Archive (Allen County).
5. Vol. 5. 1902 – via Internet Archive (Allen County).
6. Vol. 6. 1903 – via Internet Archive (Allen County).
7. Vol. 7. 1904 – via Google Books (Cal Berkeley).
8. Vol. 8. 1904 – via Google Books (Cal Berkeley).
- The Book of Public Speaking (7 Vols.). London: Caxton Publishing Company. 1913 – via HathiTrust.
As author

- Armorial Families. OCLC 3588083 (all editions).
1. ↓ Edinburgh: T.C. & E.C. Jack, publisher. Thomas Chater Jack (1863–1939) and Edwin Chisholm Jack (1864–1939) (husband of Louey Chisholm; 1863–1948), sons of Thomas Chisholm Jack (1830–1886), the publishing firm's founder.
2. 1895. 1st ed. Sub-title: A Complete Peerage, Baronetage, and Knightage, and a Directory of Some Gentlemen of Coat-Armour, and Being the First Attempt to Show Which Arms in Use at the Moment Are Borne by Legal Authority.
  1. HathiTrust (Cal Berkeley).
  2. HathiTrust (Cornell).
  3. Via Internet Archive (Allen County Public Library).
3. 1899. 3rd ed. Sub-title: A Directory of Some Gentlemen of Coat-Armour, Showing which Arms in Use at the Moment are Borne by Legal Authority.
  1. Via HathiTrust (Cal Berkeley).
  2. Via Internet Archive (Cal Berkeley).
4. 1902. 4th ed. Sub-title: A Directory of Gentlemen of Coat-Armour, Showing Which Arms in Use at the Moment Are Borne by Legal Authority.
  1. Via Google Books (Yale).
5. 1905. 5th ed. Sub-title: A Directory of Gentlemen of Coat-Armour. LCCN 06-11561
  1. Via HathiTrust (Cal Berkeley).
  2. Via HathiTrust (Cal Berkeley).
  3. Via Wikimedia Commons (Cal Berkeley).
  4. See images at Wikimedia Commons (Boston Public Library).
6. 1910. 6th ed. Sub-title: A Directory of Gentlemen of Coat-Armour. LCCN 59-56145.
  1. Via HathiTrust (Getty Research Institute).
  2. Via Google Books (Iowa).
  ↓ London: Hurst & Blackett, Ltd., publisher.
7. 1929. 7th ed. Sub-title: A Directory of Gentlemen of Coat-Armour. LCCN 38-14084; OCLC 2704137.
  1. Vol. 1: Via Internet Archive (Boston Public Library).
  2. Vol. 2: Via Internet Archive (Boston Public Library).
  3. Vol. 1: Via HathiTrust (Michigan).
  4. Vol. 2: Via HathiTrust (Michigan).
- The Book of Public Arms – A Clopædia of the Armorial Bearings, Heraldic Devices, and Seals, as Authorised and as Used, of the Counties, Cities, Towns, and Universities of the United Kingdom. Edinburgh: T.C. & E.C. Jack. 1915 [1894]. Retrieved March 18, 2025. OCLC 3588161 (all editions).
1. Via Internet Archive (Cornell). 1894.
2. 1915 variant title: The Book of Public Arms – A Complete Encyclopædia of all Royal, Territorial, Municipal, Corporate, Official, and Impersonal Arms.
3. Via Google Books (Minnesota) (new ed.). 1915.
- The Art of Heraldry: An Encyclopædia of Armory. Edinburgh: T.C. & E.C. Jack. 1904. Retrieved March 7, 2025. LCCN 04-12432, LCCN 58-53048; OCLC 3588106 (all editions).

See The Art of Heraldry: An Encyclopædia of Armory

1. Via Internet Archive (Boston). Plate 4 (between pages 16 & 17).
2. Via Google Books (Princeton). Plate 4 (between pages 16 & 17).
- Fox-Davies, Arthur Charles; Carlyon-Britton, Philip William Poole (1863–1938) [at Wikidata] (1906). A Treatise on the Law Concerning Names and Changes of Name. London: Elliot Stock, publisher.
1. Via Internet Archive (UCLA).
- Heraldic Badges. London: John Lane. 1907 [1901]. OCLC 4897294 (all editions).
1. Via HathiTrust.
2. Via Google Books (NYPL).
- Heraldry Explained (a shortened version of The Art of Heraldry: An Encyclopædia of Armory). Edinburgh: T.C. & E.C. Jack. Retrieved March 7, 2025.
1. Via Internet Archive (Boston Public Library). 1907.
- A Complete Guide to Heraldry: Illustrated by Nine Plates in Colour and Nearly 800 Other Designs, Mainly From Drawings by Graham Johnston, Herald Painter to the Lyon Court (a shorter version of The Art of Heraldry: An Encyclopædia of Armory). Edinburgh: T.C. & E.C. Jack. 1909. Retrieved March 10, 2025. LCCN 73-115793 (1969 re-print), LCCN 84-29280 (1985 re-print); OCLC 1048481784.
1. Via Internet Archive (University of California Libraries).
2. Via Google Books (Stanford).
- "X" (pseudonym) (1899). The Right to Bear Arms. London: Elliot Stock (1838–1911). Retrieved March 14, 2025.
1. Via Google Books (Oxford).
- Their Majesties' Court – 1906. London: The Caxton Publishing Company, publisher. 1906.
1. Via HathiTrust (Cal Berkeley).
- The Dangerville Inheritance. John Lane. New York: John Lane Company. McMvii. 1907. OCLC 11192869 (all editions).
1. Via Internet Archive (NYPL).
- The Mauleverer Murders. London: John Lane. 1907.
1. Via Google Books (NYPL).
- The Average Man. London: George Routledge & Sons, Ltd. 1907. OCLC 78244185 (all editions).
- The Finances of Sir John Kynnersley. 1907.
1. Via HathiTrust (NYPL).
2. Via Google Books (NYPL).
- "The Sex Triumphant". With four full-page plates by H.L. Shindler (né Harry Lumsden Shindler; 1870–1964). London: George Routledge & Sons, Ltd. 1909. OCLC 767241725.
1. In Clarke, Ignatius Frederick "Ian" (1918–2009), ed. (2000). British Future Fiction. Vol. 5: "1700–1914".
  1. 2017 re-print. London: Taylor and Francis. ISBN 978-1-3512-2262-4, 1-3512-2262-7; OCLC 1011122256 (all editions).
- The Troubles of Colonel Marwood. London: F.V. White → Frederick Vernon White (1851–1932). 1909. OCLC 315843551 (all editions).
- The Duplicate Death. New York: The Macaulay Company. 1910. OCLC 11192921 (all editions).
1. Via Internet Archive (NYPL).
- The Testament of John Hastings. London: John Long, Ltd. 1911. OCLC 4349807 (all editions).
- The Ultimate Conclusion. London: John Long, Ltd. 1912. OCLC 21249836 (all editions).

== Coat of arms ==
Coat of arms of Arthur Charles Fox-Davies
Adopted 1905 Crest A demi dragon rampant Gules collared Or holding in the dexter claw a hammer proper Escutcheon Sable a demi sun in splendour issuant in base Or a chief dancetée Or Motto Da Fydd (Welsh for 'Good Faith') and a pun on the name Davies

== Bibliography ==
=== References ===
- Bookseller (The): A Newspaper of British and Foreign Literature. Edinburgh. 1802. Retrieved March 7, 2025. ISSN 0006-7539; OCLC 8861630 (all editions).
1. "Trade and Literary Gossip" → "Messrs. T. C. & E. C. Jack". Thomas Chater Jack (1863–1939) and Edwin Chisholm Jack (1864–1939) (husband of Louey Chisholm; 1863–1948), sons of Thomas Chisholm Jack (1830–1886), the publishing firm's founder. Vol. 65 (Old Series), No. 972 → Vol. 15 (New Series), No. 351. 11 February 1916. p. 51 – via Internet Archive (Illinois).
- The Catholic Encyclopedia and Its Makers. New York: The Encyclopedia Press. 1917. p. 60. This article incorporates text from this source, which is in the public domain.
- Dickins, Gordon (1987). An Illustrated Literary Guide to Shropshire (2nd ed.). Shropshire Libraries. pp. 32, 94. ISBN 978-0-9038-0237-6, 0-9038-0237-6; OCLC 60048879 (all editions).
- Fox-Davies, Arthur Charles. Armorial Families: A Directory of Some Gentlemen of Coat-Armour, Showing which Arms in Use at the Moment are Borne by Legal Authority. Edinburgh: T.C. & E.C. Jack. Retrieved September 8, 2017. OCLC 259702444 (all editions).
1. ↓ Edinburgh: T.C. & E.C. Jack, publisher
2. 3rd ed. Via HathiTrust (Cal Berkeley). 1899.
3. 3rd ed. Via Internet Archive (Cal Berkeley). 1899.
4. ↓ London: Hurst & Blackett, Ltd., publisher
5. 7th ed. Via Internet Archive (Boston). 1929. p. 716.
- Hurd, Sir Percy Angier (1864–1950); Massey, Albert (asst. ed. beginning 1906), eds. (1898–1928). The Outlook (weekly). The Outlook Publishing Co., 167 Strand, W.C., publisher. Dublin: Hodges, Figgis, and Co., 104, Grafton Street, distributor. Retrieved March 13, 2014. OCLC 13515926 (all editions), 222000564.
1. Review (17 August 1907). "The Average Man. By A. C. Fox-Davies". Vol. 20, No. 498. p. 215 – via Google Books (NYPL).
- International Who's Who (1912). "Fox-Davies, Arthur Charles". The International Who's Who in the World. New York: International Who's Who Publishing Company. pp. 474–475.
1. Via Internet Archive (Harvard).
2. Via Google Books (Harvard).
- Lattimore, Colin (2012). The Bookplates of Miss C. Helard. London: The Bookplate Society. ISBN 978-0-9555-4282-4.
Includes a detailed biography and profile of Fox-Davies in Section 2, and Fox-Davies's own unpublished biographical notes about himself and his family in Appendix 3.
- Obituary (21 May 1928). "Mr. A. C. Fox-Davies, Expert in Pedigrees and Heraldry". The Times. p. 22.
1. Transcript Via Findagrave.com.
- Round, John Horace (1854–1928) (1910). Peerage and Pedigree; Studies in Peerage Law and Family History (2 Vols.). London: James Nisbet & Co., Ltd. & The St. Catherine Press. Retrieved March 15, 2025. OCLC 21477012 (all editions).
1. "Heraldry and the Gent". Vol. 1. 1910. pp. 307–384 – via Internet Archive (Cornell).
- Saturday Review of Books (7 September 1907). "Real Thing in the Murder Mystery Line." – "The Mauleverer Murders. By A. C. Fox-Davies". The New York Times. Reviews of Most Lately Published Books. Vol. 56, no. 18123. p. 540 (digital image 26 of 30). Retrieved January 8, 2015.
1. Pdf Via Times Machine (PDF).
2. Pdf Via WayBack Machine (PDF) (Archived March 14, 2022). Archived from the original (PDF) on 14 March 2022.
3. Via New York Times Permalink.
- Who Was Who (Fox-Davies, Arthur Charles). First published in 1848.
1. Online via Oxford University Press. Oxford University Press. 1 December 2007. doi:10.1093/ww/9780199540884.013.U196567; ISBN 978-0-1995-4089-1; OCLC 5557231783.
2. Vol. 2: "1916–1928" (5 Vols.) (4th ed.). Adam & Charles Black. 1967 – via Internet Archive (Camp C.C., Franklin, Virginia). ISBN 978-0-7136-0169-5, 0-7136-0169-8; OCLC 6352121 (all editions).
