= The Art of Heraldry: An Encyclopædia of Armory =

Book by Arthur Charles Fox-Davies

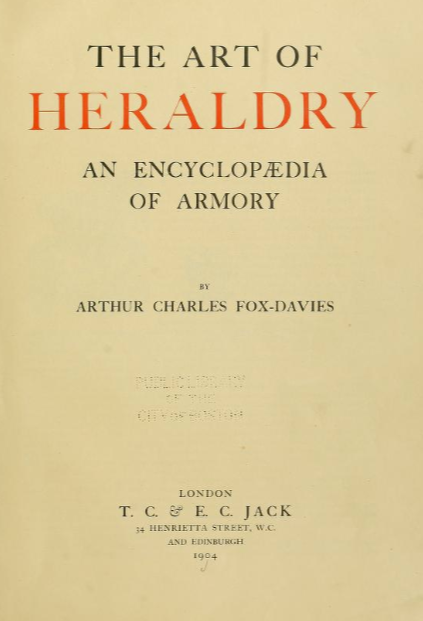
- Title page for The Art of Heraldry: An Encyclopædia of Armory (1904)
- Author: Arthur Charles Fox-Davies
- Illustrator: Hugo Gerard Ströhl
- Language: English
- Subject: Heraldry
- Published: 1904 (T.C. & E.C. Jack)
- Publication place: United Kingdom
- Media type: Print
- Pages: viii + 503

The Art of Heraldry: An Encyclopædia of Armory is a book on heraldry and armory by Arthur Charles Fox-Davies, originally published in 1904.

== Description ==
The book was originally conceived as an English translation of Ströhl's Heraldischer Atlas, written in German. However, in Fox-Davies' hands, it was so much transformed and expanded that it became a largely original work specifically directed to the history, theory and practice of English heraldry, with illustrations in black and white and in colour throughout. The parts written by Ströhl were translated to English by Fox-Davies's sister Grace Muriel Fox-Davies, while Fox-Davies himself wrote other chapters in whole or in part and other chapters were written in whole or in part by heraldists such as the then (i) Lyon King of Arms Sir James Balfour Paul (1846–1931) and (ii) Richmond Heralds Charles Harold Athill, MVO, FSA (1853–1922), Cyril James Humphries Davenport, FSA (1848–1941), Albert Hartshorne, FSA (1839–1910), and Walter Jenkinson Kaye, FSA

Apart from the illustrations by Ströhl, the book also included heraldic drawings specially commissioned for heraldic records published by Fox-Davies.

This large 500-page book was re-issued in black and white only in 1976 by an American publisher and in 1986 in colour by a Bloomsbury Books of London. Much of the material in this book was re-used in a shorter, cheaper and more popular exposition of contemporary English heraldic practice, Complete Guide to Heraldry, which proved very successful and influential. This too has been reprinted several times. Another even shorter guide was Heraldry Explained, but even this balanced a clear and didactic text with plentiful illustration.

Fox-Davies died in 1928 (and Ströhl died in 1919), so the book is now in public domain, the copyright having expired in 1998.

== Bibliography ==
=== References ===
- Fox-Davies, Arthur Charles (1871–1928) (1904). The Art of Heraldry: An Encyclopædia of Armory. Edinburgh: T.C. & E.C. Jack → Thomas Chater Jack (1863–1939) and Edwin Chisholm Jack (1864–1939) (husband of Louey Chisholm; 1863–1948), sons of Thomas Chisholm Jack (1830–1886), the publishing firm's founder. Retrieved January 4, 2014. LCCN 04-12432, LCCN 58-53048; OCLC 3588106 (all editions).
1. Via Internet Archive (Boston).
2. Via Google Books (Princeton).
- Fox-Davies, Arthur Charles (1871–1928). Heraldry Explained (a shortened version of The Art of Heraldry: An Encyclopædia of Armory). Edinburgh: T.C. & E.C. Jack. Retrieved March 7, 2025.
1. Via Internet Archive (Boston Public Library).
- Fox-Davies, Arthur Charles (1871–1928) (1986) [1904]. The Art of Heraldry: An Encyclopædia of Armory. Edinburgh: T.C. & E.C. Jack. Re-printed by Bloomsbury Books, London. Retrieved January 4, 2014. ISBN 978-0-9062-2334-5, 0-9062-2334-2; OCLC 17199560.
- Fox-Davies, Arthur Charles (1871–1928) (1909). A Complete Guide to Heraldry: Illustrated by Nine Plates in Colour and Nearly 800 Other Designs, Mainly From Drawings by Graham Johnston, Herald Painter to the Lyon Court (a shorter version of The Art of Heraldry: An Encyclopædia of Armory). Edinburgh: T.C. & E.C. Jack. Retrieved March 10, 2025. LCCN 73-115793 (1969 re-print), LCCN 84-29280 (1985 re-print); OCLC 1048481784.
1. Via Internet Archive (Cal Berkeley).
2. Via Google Books (Stanford).
- Ströhl, Hugo Gerard (1851–1919) (1899). Heraldischer Atlas – Eine Sammlung von heraldischen Musterblättern für Künstler, Gewerbetreibende sowie für Freunde der Wappenkunde, zusammengestellt und erläutert [Heraldic Atlas: A Collection of Heraldic Pattern Sheets for Artists, Tradespeople, and Enthusiasts of Heraldry, Compiled and Explained] (in German). Stuttgart: Julius Hoffmann (1833–1904), publisher. Retrieved March 23, 2025. OCLC 247556768 (all editions).
1. Via Internet Archive.
