= The Forsaken Merman =

Poem by Matthew Arnold

- by Matthew Arnold
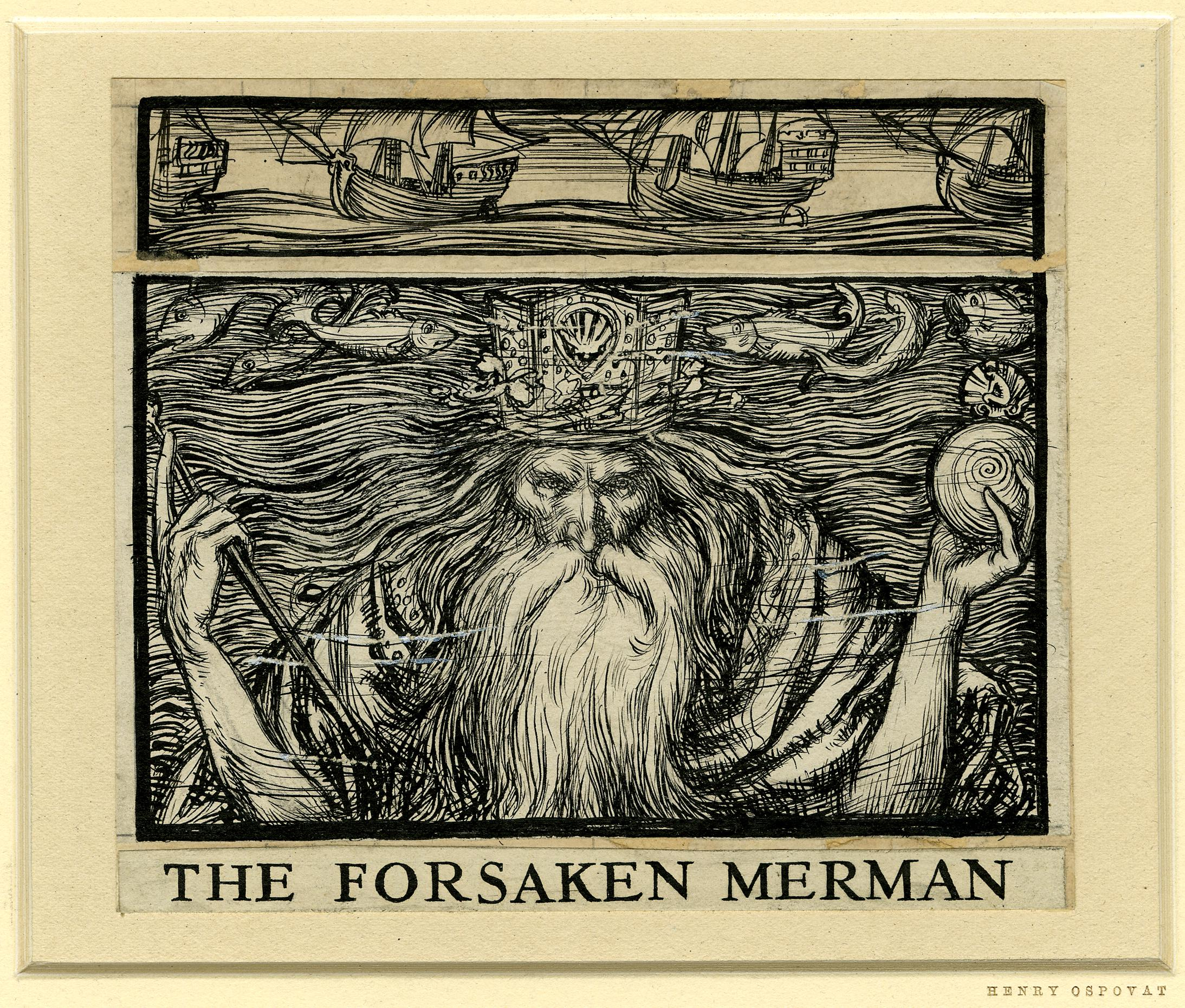
- Illustration to "The Forsaken Merman" in Poems by Matthew Arnold, 1900

Full text
- The Forsaken Merman at Wikisource

"The Forsaken Merman" is a rhymed lyric poem written in irregular metre by Matthew Arnold, begun whilst he was studying at Oxford on a scholarship in the early 1840s, and which appeared in the poet's first published collection, The Strayed Reveller, and Other Poems, in 1849.

== Synopsis ==
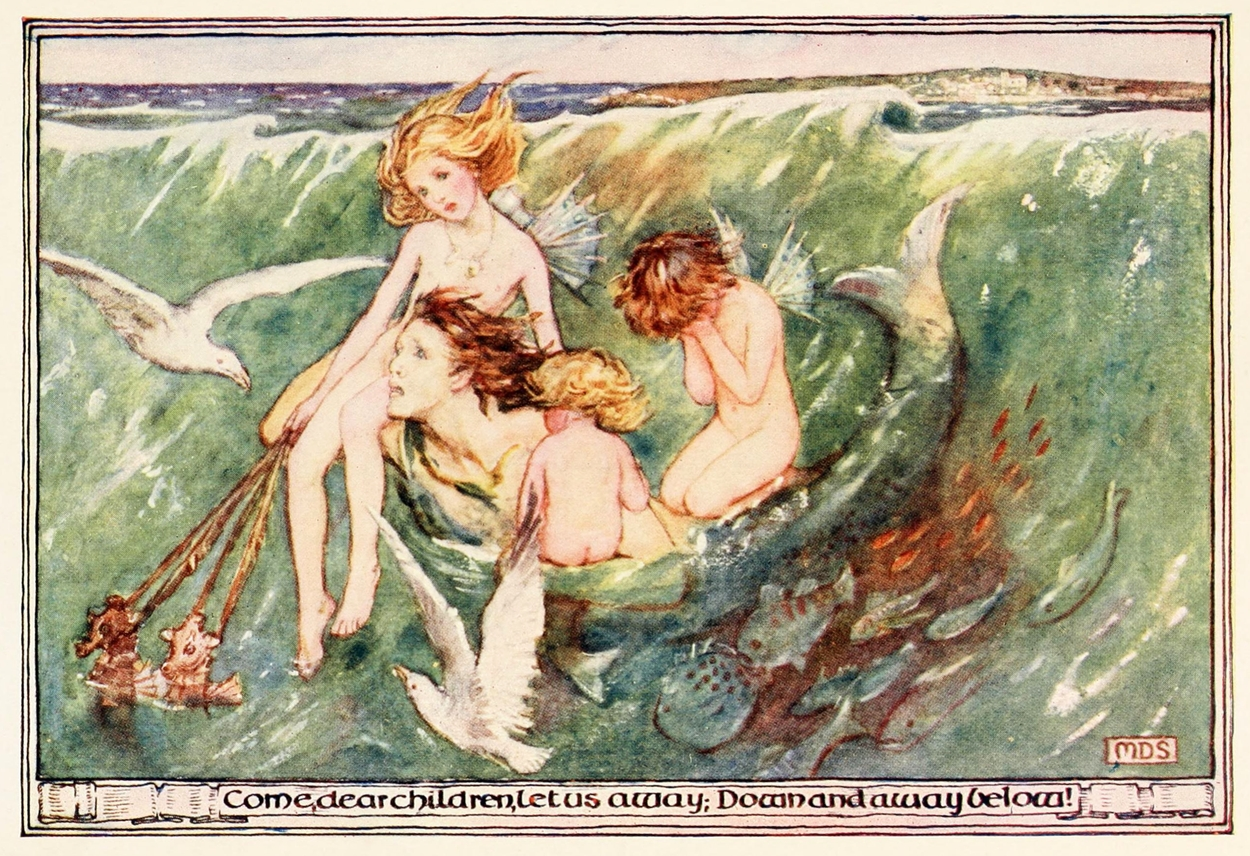
Illustration of the opening lines by Minnie Dibdin Spooner, 1906

The basic premise recurs in Danish, Norwegian, German, and Slavonic folklore. The Merman, a King of the Sea, marries an earthly maiden, and lives with her happily, for many years, but at last she leaves him for a visit to her friends, promising, however, to return. Time passes, but she comes not back. Scruples of conscience have arisen, and she chooses, as she thinks, between her soul and her family. The story is told by the old Sea King, in what the reviewer Charles J. Peterson called "a wild, irregular melody", to his children.

== Reception ==
Many critics initially found most of the poems in The Strayed Reveller to be obscure and aloof, but "The Forsaken Merman" was highly praised by fellow-poet Algernon Charles Swinburne for its lyric beauty.

== Sources ==
- Peterson, Charles J. (May 1854). "An Hour with the New Poets". Peterson's Magazine, 25(5). p. 331.
- "The Forsaken Merman". The Story Museum. 28 August 2020. Retrieved 7 April 2023.
