= Louey Chisholm =

Louey Chisholm (Louise Charlotte Jack, née Steinitz; 1863 – 28 October 1948) was a British writer, editor, and publisher of books for children.

== Life ==
Louise Charlotte Steinitz was born in 1863, the daughter of German and Scottish parents. Her father was Reverend J. J. Steinitz. She was educated in Dollar and Edinburgh.

She married Edwin Chisholm Jack, a publisher, on 28 June 1894. He encouraged her interest in poetry and storytelling for children. The couple lived in Edinburgh, where Louise was active in the Edinburgh Poetry Club, and the local branch of the Scottish Association for the Speaking of Verse. They had a house built for them by Robert Lorimer, moving later to a terrace house in Morningside. Her close friends included art historian James Caw, writer Herbert Read, and artist Henry John Lintott. The Scotsman described her as "a woman of exceptional gifts of understanding, of poetic apprehension, and quick sympathy".

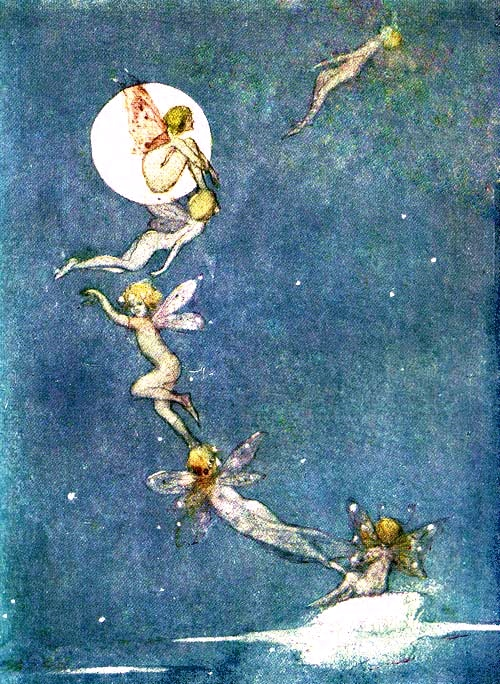
Illustration from by Katharine Cameron from Stories from the Ballads by Mary MacGregor, part of the Told to the Children series edited by Louey Chisholm

As Louey Chisholm, she edited two volumes of fairytales: In Fairyland (1904) and The Enchanted Land (1906). These were illustrated by Katherine Cameron, and were successful. Also in 1906, she published Golden Staircase, an anthology of poetry for children. Chisholm subsequently conceived the Told to the Children and Shown to the Children series which, according to The Scotsman, "had a great vogue, and became, and continued, for many years a model of what such things might and could be". She credited the success of the books to their illustrations. Told to the Children included works by Lena Dalkeith and Janet Harvey Kelman. The Shown to the Children series included works on animals, flowers, birds, the sea-shore, the farm, trees, nest and eggs, butterflies and moths, stars, gardens, and bees.

In 1910, The Bookman described Chisholm as:

an excellent hand at the retelling of familiar fairy tales... While retaining the spirit and poetry of the stories, she contrives to express them in language suitable for the comprehension of a youthful audience...

The couple's daughter, Marie Winifred Jack (1895–1988), was the subject of a portrait by Henry John Lintott, exhibited at the RSA Annual Exhibition of 1920.

Louise Charlotte Jack died on 28 October 1948. She left money to The Thistle Foundation, Edinburgh Old People's Welfare Council, Mothers’ Welfare Clinic, and St Saviour's Child Garden, Canongate, Edinburgh.

== Selected bibliography ==
- In Fairyland (1904)
- Told to the Children Series, edited by Louey Chisholm (1905–1909)
- Shown to the Children Series, edited by Louey Chisholm (from 1906)
- The Enchanted Land, with pictures by Katharine Cameron (1906)
- The Golden Staircase: Poems and Verses for Children, chosen by Louey Chisholm, with Pictures by M. Dibdin Spooner (1907)
- Simple Susan, re-told by Louey Chisholm (1910)
- Wordsworth Thoughts, selected by Louey Chisholm (1910)
- Nursery Rhymes, chosen by Louey Chisholm, with pictures by F.M.B. Blaikie (1911)
- Nursery Rhymes, chosen by Louey Chisholm, and Fables, re-told for children by Lena Dalkeith (1940)
