= Avellane cross =

Depiction of the heraldic "avellane cross" from A Glossary of Terms Used in Heraldry.

In heraldry, an avellane cross is a form of cross which resembles four hazel filberts in their husks or cases, joined at the great end. The term comes from the Latin name for the hazel, originally Nux avellana. It was fairly rare in English heraldry.
