= Janet Harvey Kelman =

Scottish illustrator, writer, educator (1873–1957)

- Born: April 18, 1873; Leith, Scotland
- Died: November 15, 1957 (aged 84)
- Resting place: Grange Cemetery, Edinburgh, Scotland
- Occupations: writer, Illustrator, educator

Janet Harvey Kelman (18 April 1873 – 15 November 1957) was a Scottish writer and illustrator. She was also director of a YWCA training college in Selly Oak, Birmingham.

== Life ==
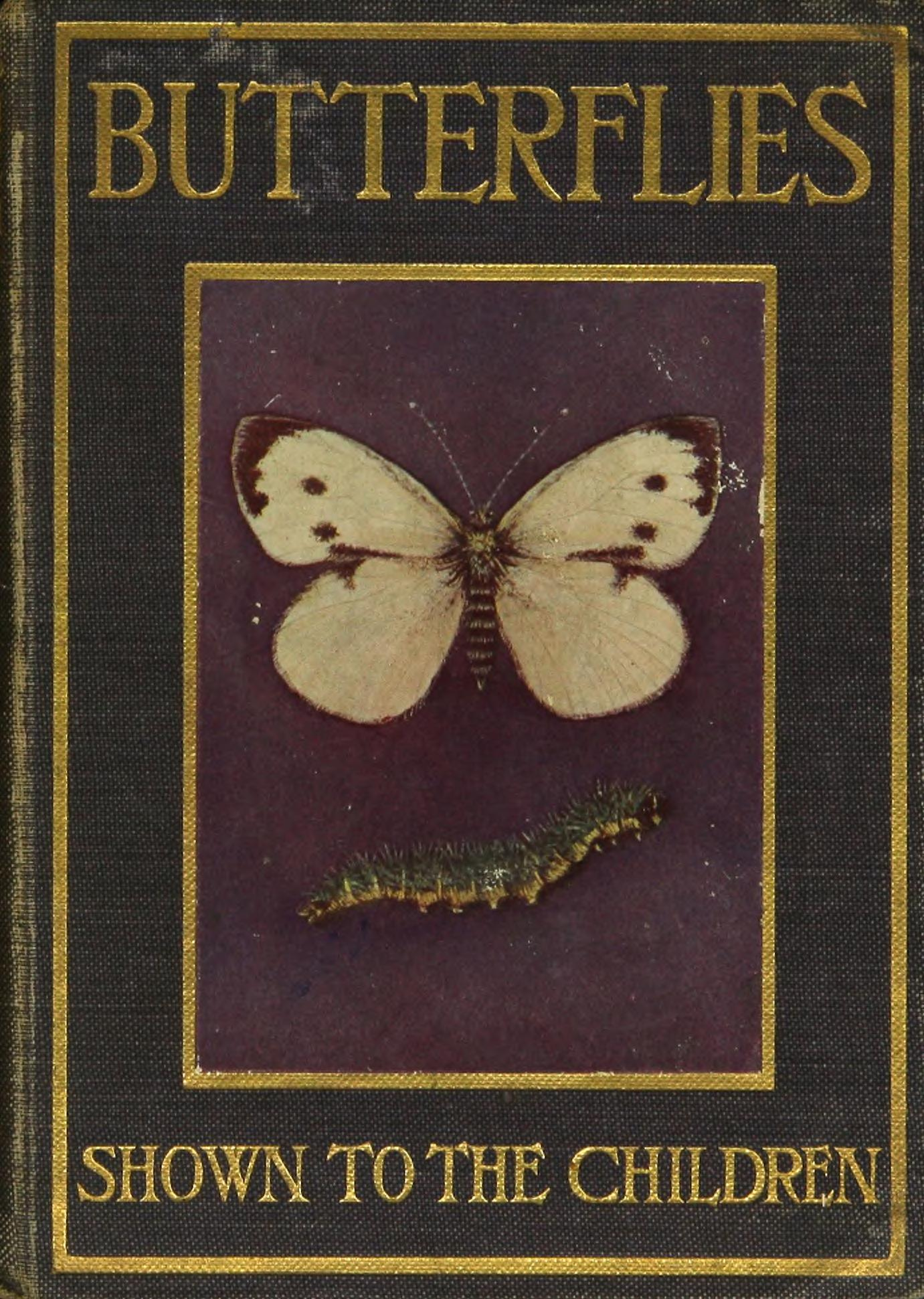

Janet Harvey Kelman was born in Leith, Scotland, on 18 April 1873, the daughter of Margaret Harper Urquhart and John Kelman, a reverend. Her brother, John Kelman, became a United Free Church of Scotland minister, and a published writer.

In 1923, Kelman published Labour in India: A Study of the Conditions of Indian Women in Modern Industry. The work was based on sixteen months Kelman spent in India, funded by a research fellowship from Selly Oak Colleges.

In 1926, Kelman was appointed director of the newly opened YWCA training school for leaders in social and religious work, in Selly Oak, Birmingham.

As well as works on natural history, Kelman published books on Christianity.

Janet Harvey Kelman died on 15 November 1957, and was buried at Grange Cemetery, Edinburgh.

== Bibliography ==
- Stories from Chaucer: Told to the Children (London, 1906)
- The Story of Chalmers of New Guinea (London, 1906)
- The Sea-shore: Shown to the Children (London, 1907)
- Butterflies and Moths: Shown to the Children (London & Edinburgh, 1909)
- Flowers: Shown to the Children (London, 1910)
- Trees: Shown to the Children (London, c. 1910)
- Labour in India: A Study of the Conditions of Indian Women in Modern Industry (London & New York, 1923)
