= Minnie Dibdin Spooner =

British artist and miniature painter

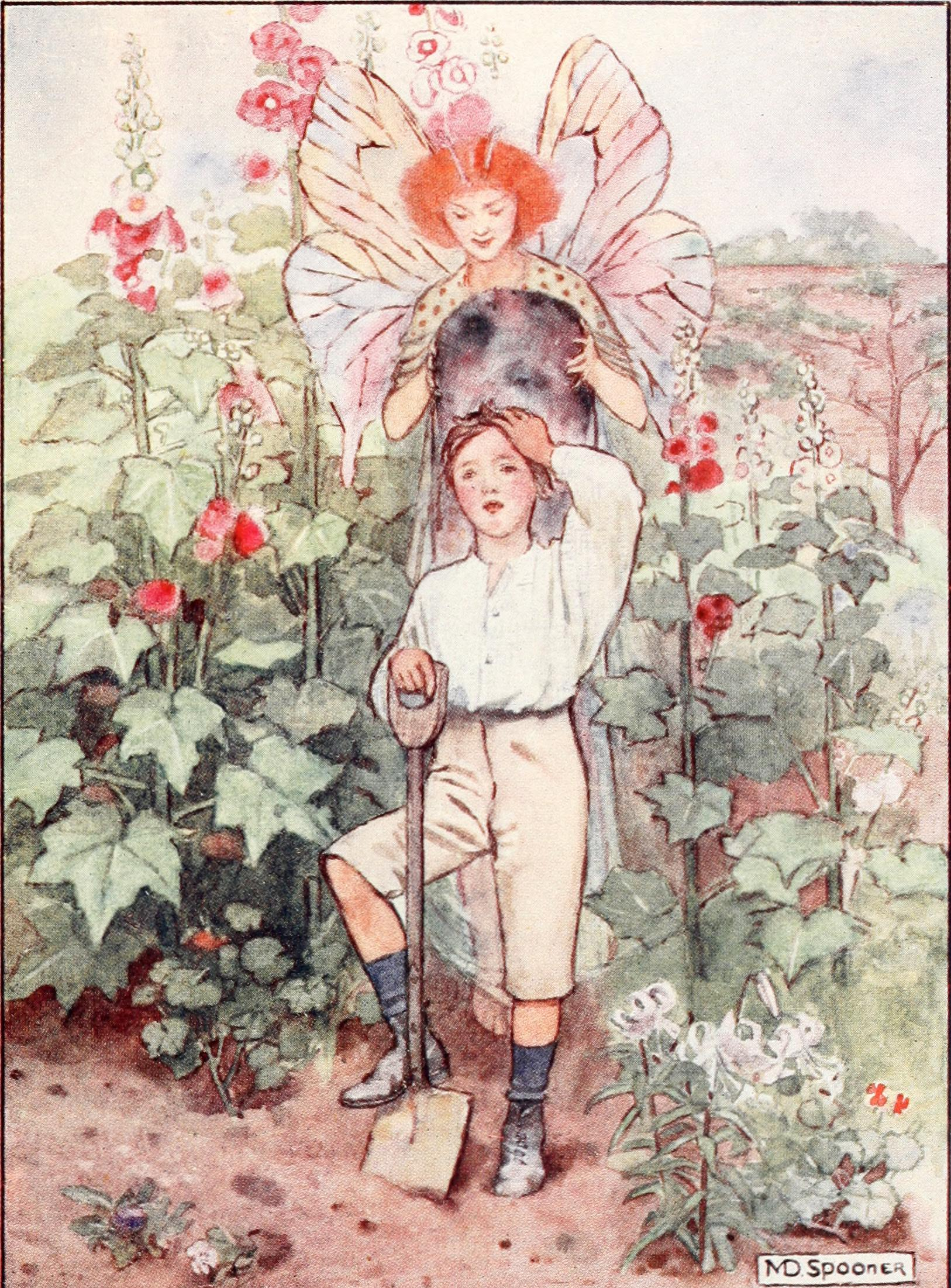
- Illustration from the book, The Golden Staircase
- Born: Winifred Dibdin Davison; 1867
- Died: November 1949 (aged 81–82)
- Occupation: Artist

Minnie Dibdin Spooner (née Davison; 1867 – 6 November 1949) was a British artist and miniature painter. She illustrated children's books under the name M. Dibdin Spooner, and collaborated on stained glass and furniture with her husband, Charles Spooner.

== Biography ==
Winifred "Minnie" Dibdin Davison was born in 1867.

According to the Journal of Stained Glass, she may have studied sometime in the 1890s at the Slade School in London. Between 1893 and 1903, she exhibited at the Royal Academy of London.

In 1900, she married Charles Sydney Spooner, an architect. She collaborated with Charles on furniture and stained glass for various church projects of his, including St. Christopher's in Haslemere and St. Hugh's RC Church in Letchworth.

She illustrated the anthology of children's poetry, The Golden Staircase: Poems and Verses for Children, published around 1906. She worked in a Victorian illustration style for the book, which was an ornate style popular for children's literature at the time.

Spooner was known as a miniature painter, including under her maiden name. She mainly used oil paint for her portraits, and used watercolour for her miniatures and other subjects. Alongside miniatures and portraits, she also painted landscapes and genre scenes. Her stained glass works were likely influenced by the styles of her friends, Louis Davis and Christopher Whall.

Spooner died on 6 November 1949.

== Gallery ==
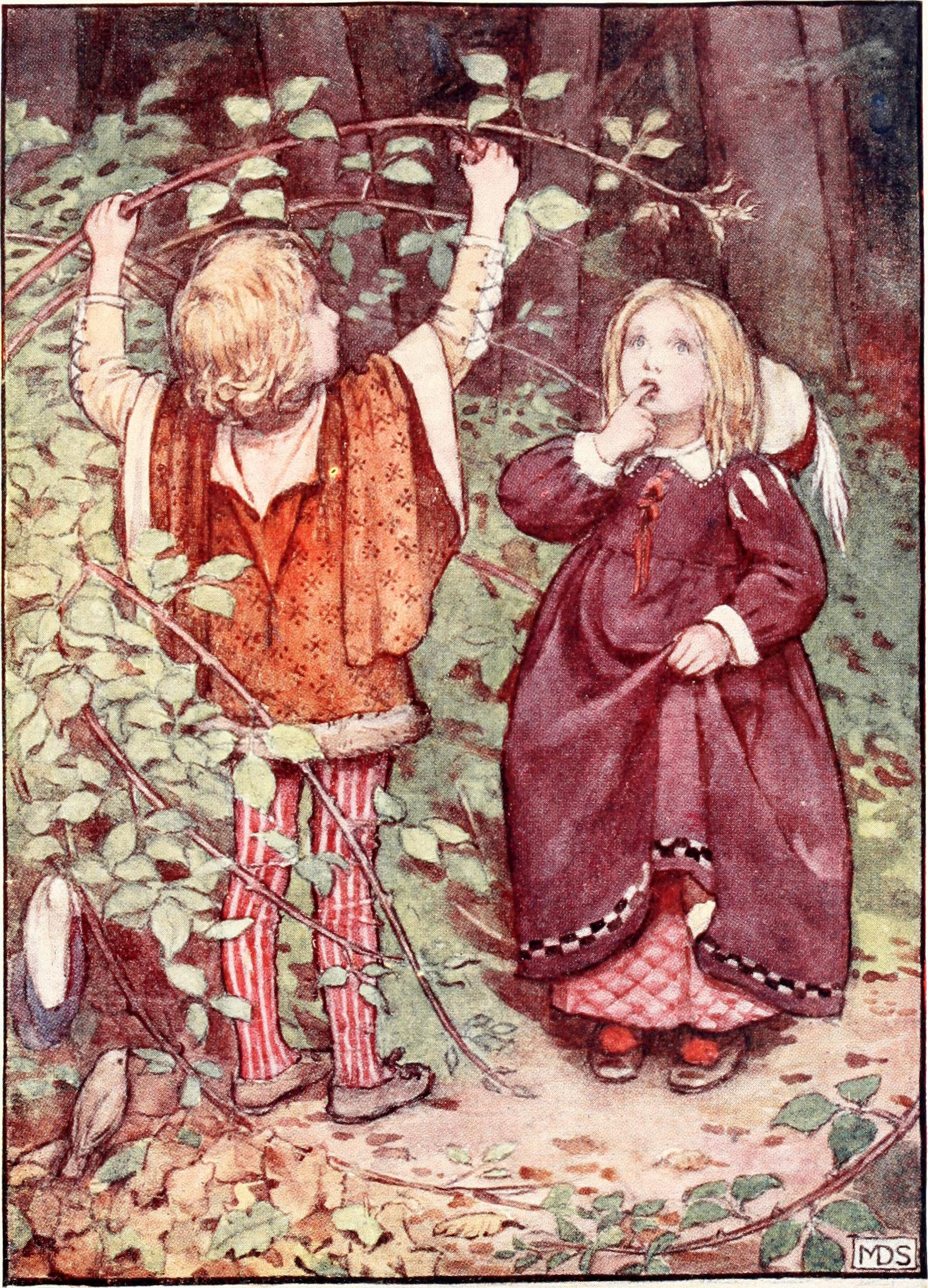
Book illustration from The Golden Staircase (1907)

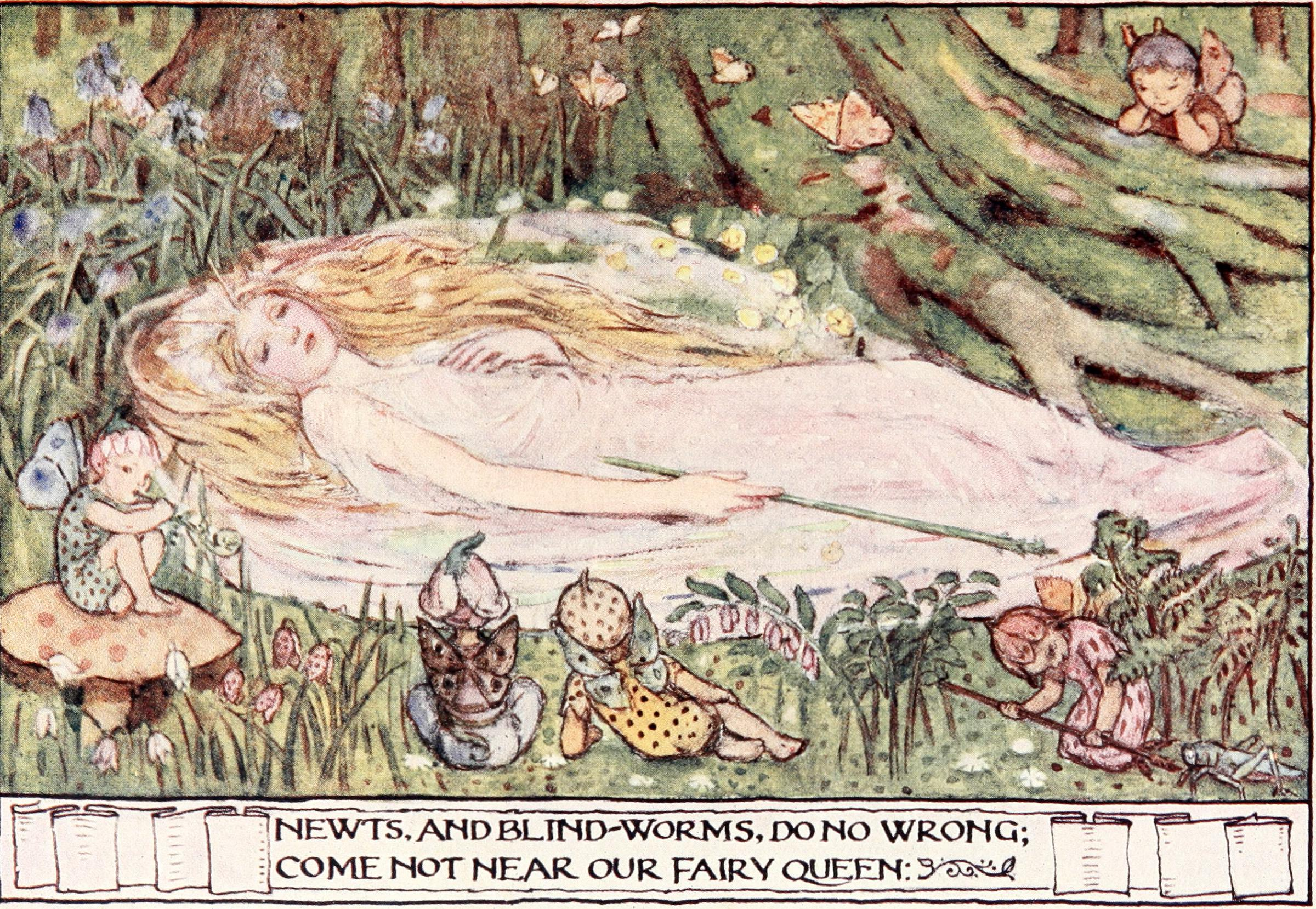
Book illustration from The Golden Staircase (1907)

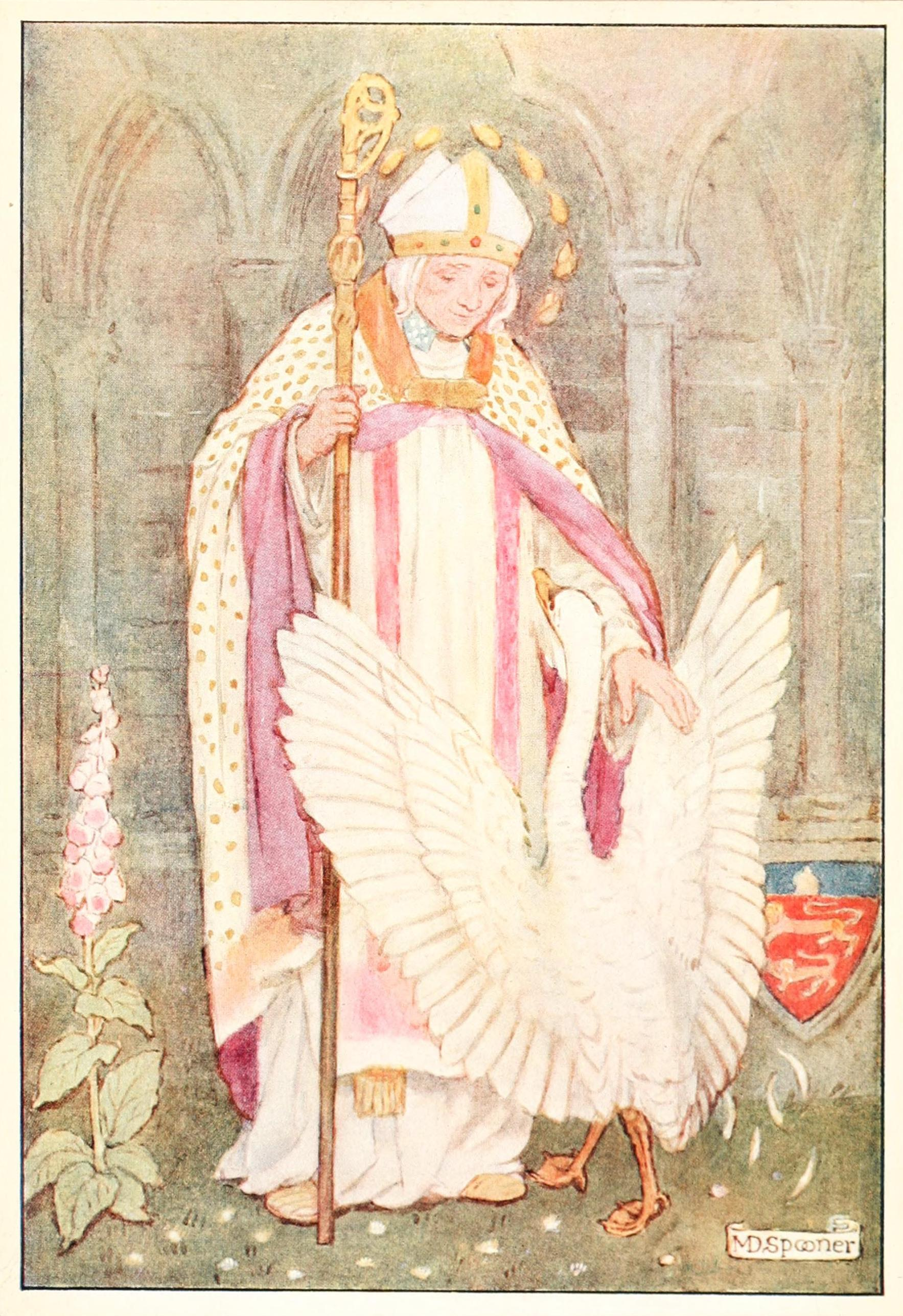
Book illustration from Our Island Saints (1912)

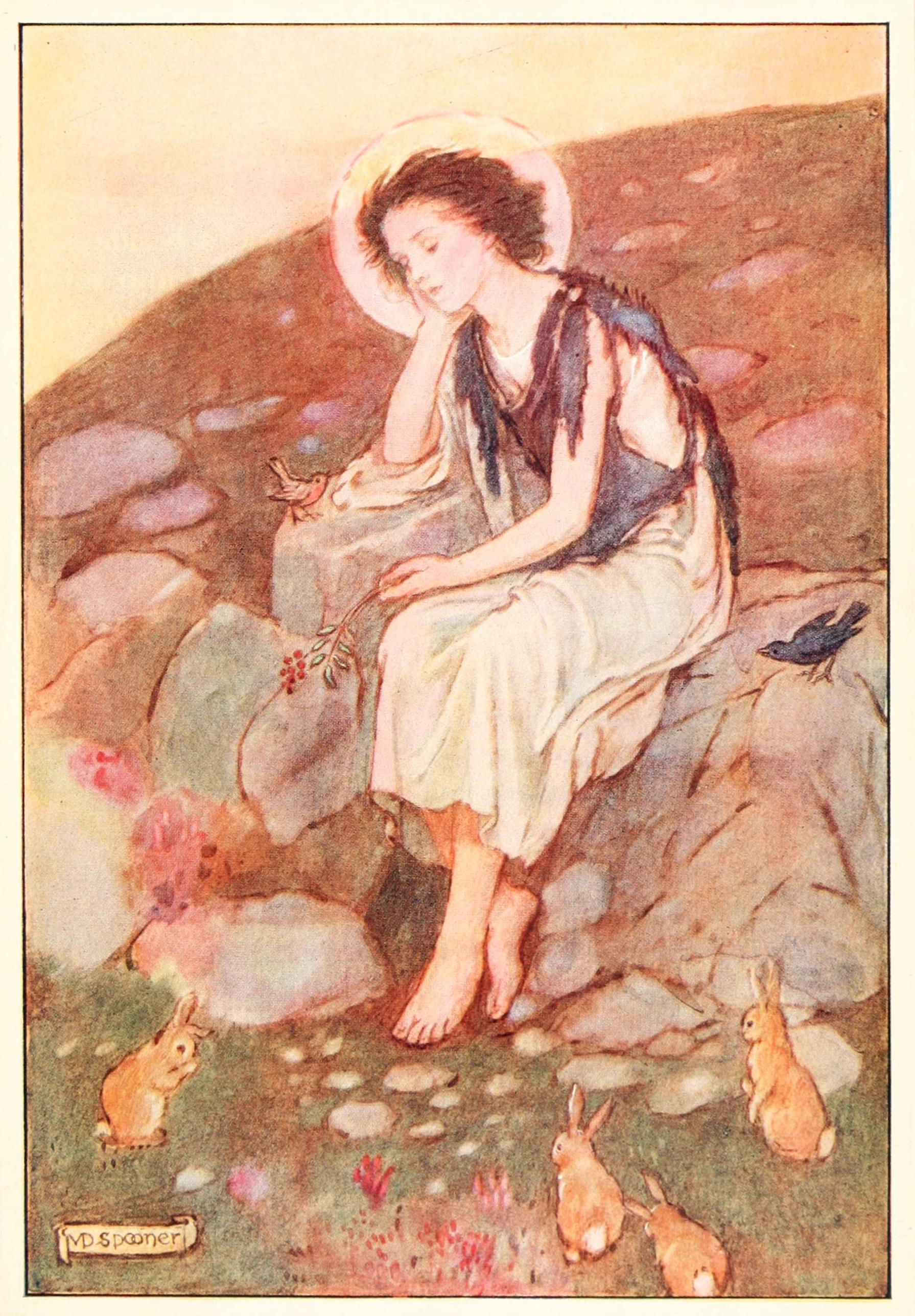
Book illustration from Our Island Saints (1912)

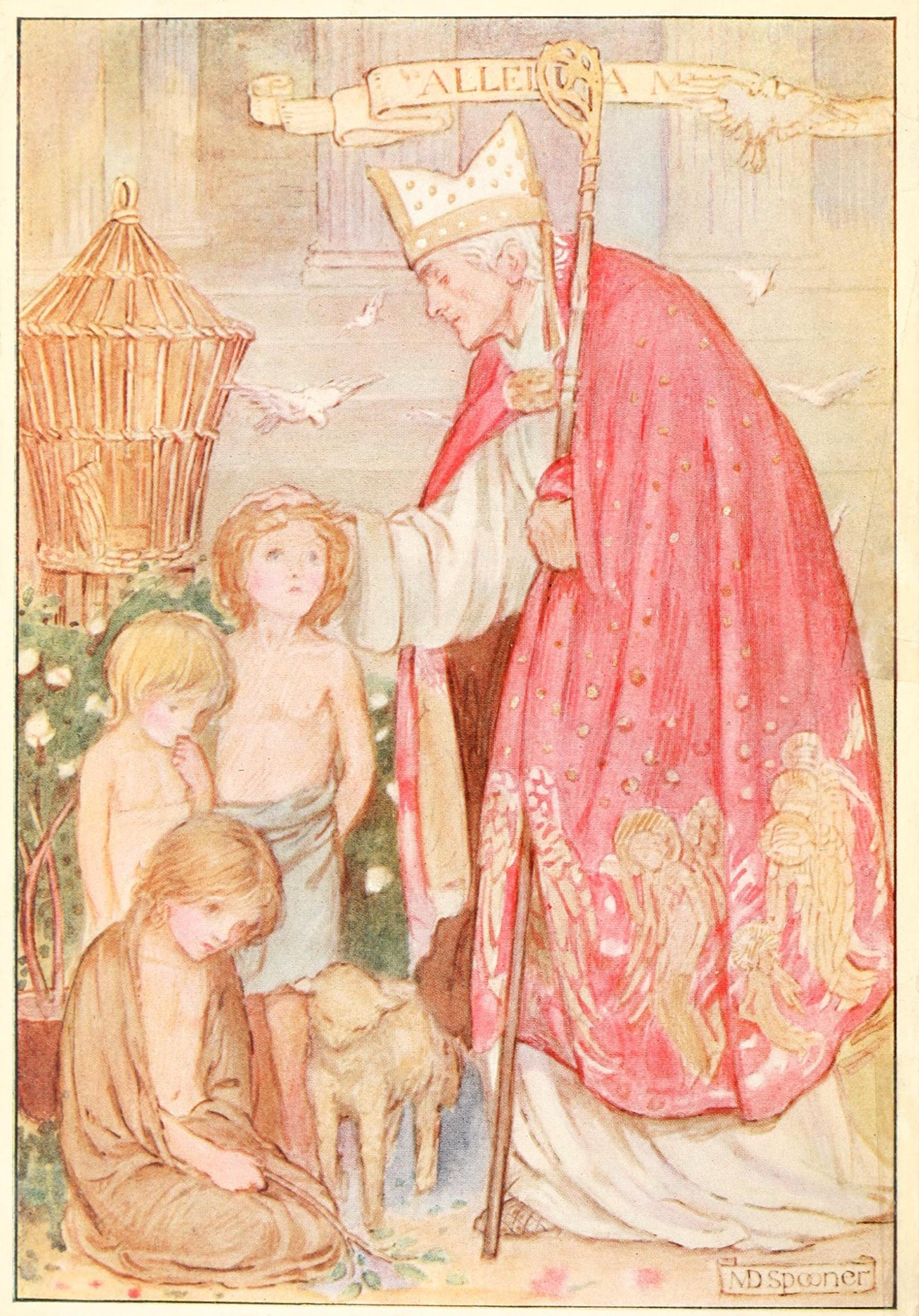
Frontispiece from Our Island Saints (1912)
