= Heraldischer Atlas =

1899 book on heraldry by Austrian heraldist and heraldic artist Hugo Gerard Ströhl

Heraldischer Atlas; eine Sammlung von heraldischen Musterblättern für Künstler, Gewerbetreibende, sowie für Freunde der Wappenkunde
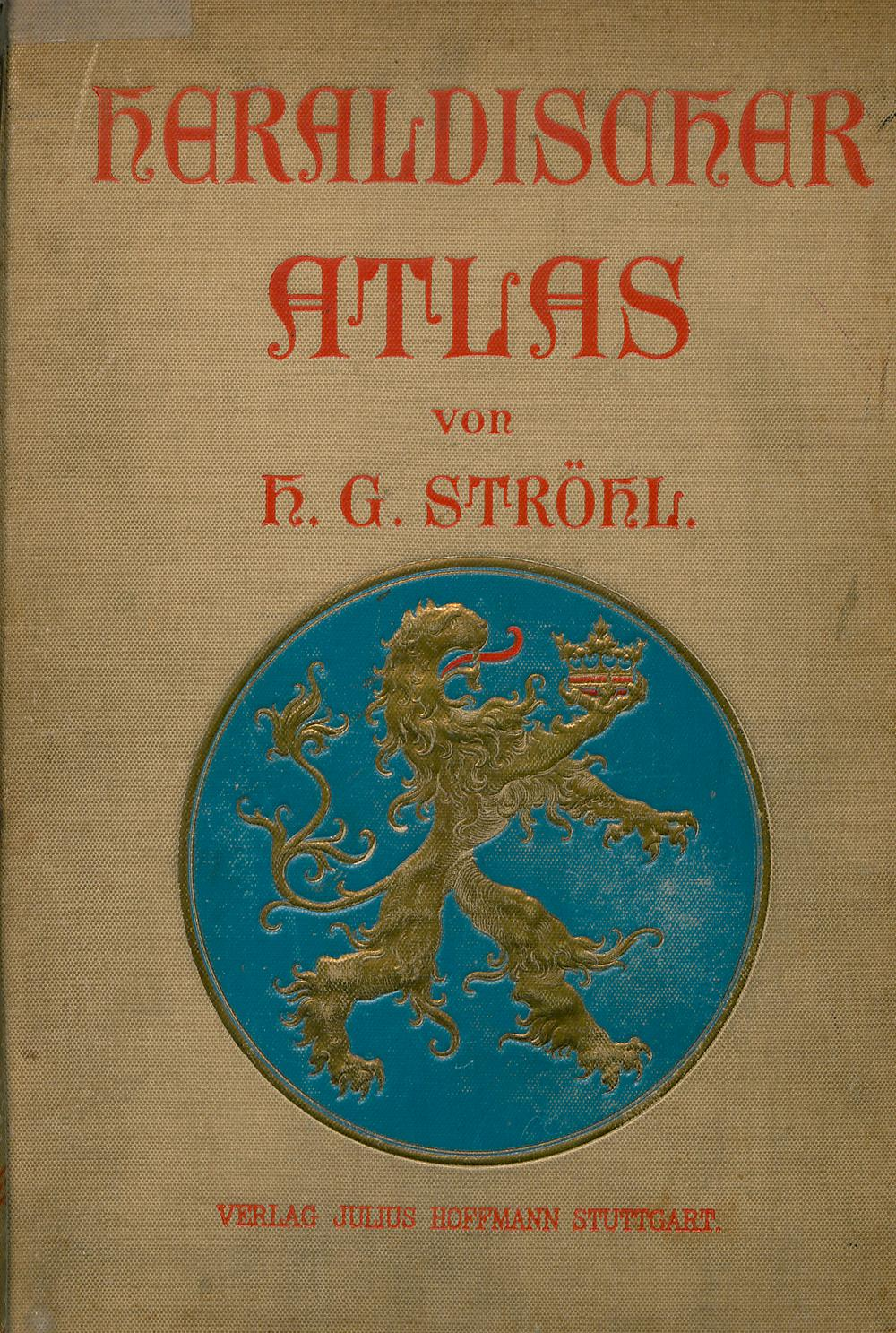
- The original book cover
- Author: Hugo Gerard Ströhl
- Original title: Heraldischer Atlas; eine Sammlung von heraldischen Musterblättern für Künstler, Gewerbetreibende, sowie für Freunde der Wappenkunde
- Language: German
- Subject: Heraldry
- Published: 1899 (Verlag Julius Hoffmann)
- Media type: Print

Heraldischer Atlas; eine Sammlung von heraldischen Musterblättern für Künstler, Gewerbetreibende, sowie für Freunde der Wappenkunde was a book on heraldry by Austrian heraldist and heraldic artist Hugo Gerard Ströhl, published in Stuttgart in 1899. As the title says, it was intended as a model book for how coats of arms should be drawn.

This large volume is still considered a standard work in German heraldic literature. The English book The Art of Heraldry: An Encyclopædia of Armory (1904) by Arthur Charles Fox-Davies incorporates its plates and much of its text translated to English.

The book is now in the public domain and free to copy; since its creator died in 1919, copyright expired in 1989.

== Reprints ==
- Heraldischer Atlas. In: Heraldische Reihe. IV, PHV Verlag, Offenbach 2000, ISBN 3-934743-08-0
- Heraldischer Atlas. Milano, Edizioni Orsini De Marzo, 2010, ISBN 978-88-7531-074-5
