= Hugo Gerard Ströhl =

Austrian heraldist (1851–1919)

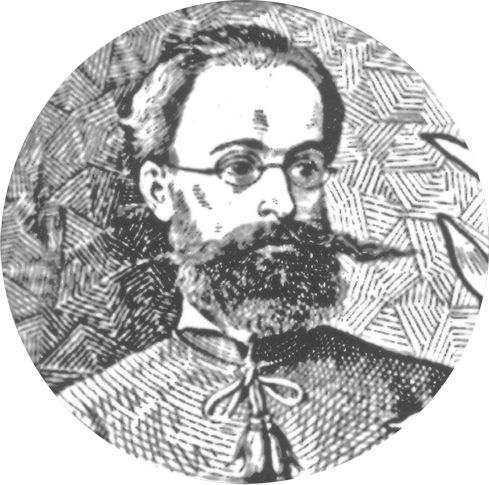
- Born: 24 September 1851; Wels, Upper Austria, Austrian Empire
- Died: 7 December 1919 (aged 68)
- Education: Kunstgewerbeschule des Österreichischen Museums für Kunst und Industrie

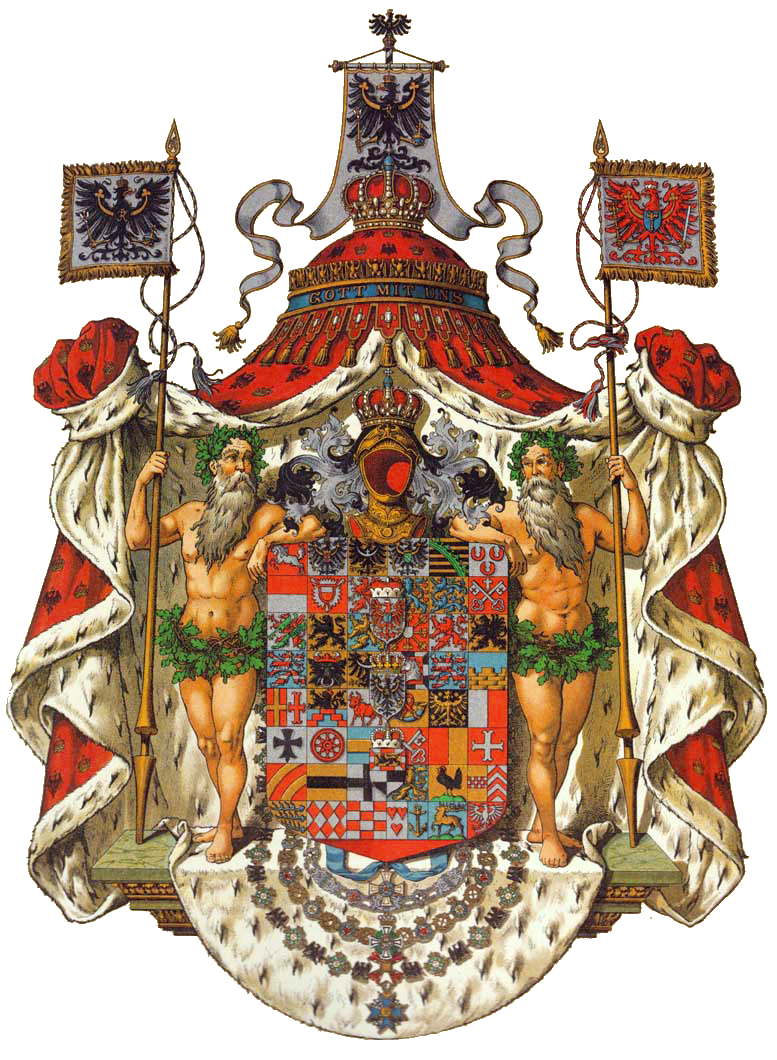
An example of Ströhl's work, the coat of arms of the Kings of Prussia, from the Deutsche Wappenrolle, Wappen von Deutschen Reiches und seiner Bundesstaaten published in 1897.

Hugo Gerard Ströhl (24 September 1851 – 7 December 1919) was an Austrian heraldist.

== Life ==
Ströhl was born in Wels in Upper Austria. A talented painter, he studied at the School for Applied Arts ("Kunstgewerbeschule des Österreichischen Museums für Kunst und Industrie", now "Hochschule für angewandte Kunst") in Vienna. After graduation, he taught painting and drawing, and founded a small printing office. Much of his work involved designing heraldic books and stamps for advertising.

His heraldic drawings, especially his main books, the Austrian-Hungarian and the Imperial German rolls of arms, are considered among the best heraldic drawings ever published.

Although it was not his first work on heraldry, the Roll of Arms of the Austrian-Hungarian Empire, or "Österreichisch-Ungarische Wappenrolle", an overview of the arms of all the territories (and claims) of the Austrian-Hungarian Empire, led to Ströhl's fame following its 1890 publication. These images can be seen in detail here

Besides European heraldry, Ströhl was also interested in the comparable Japanese system of symbolism, and he published a large book on Japanese mon, the "Nihon moncho" (日本 もんちょ) or Japanese Roll of Arms.

His "Heraldischer Atlas" is still considered a standard work in German heraldic literature.

Ströhl designed for the St. Karl Borromäus-church in the old peoples home "Am Wienerwald" in Vienna, 130 arms of Viennese guilds, which are still shown on the walls of the church (see here. He also designed a large number of civic coats of arms for municipalities in Austria and Germany, including the arms of Vienna. He died in Mödling.

== Bibliography (selection) ==
- Frisch brockte Schworzkerschäln. Schwarz-weiße Bilder zu lustigen Schnadahüpfeln aus den oestrreichischen Alpenländern, Vienna, Perles, 1891
- Die Wappen der Druckgewerbe, Vienna, 1893
- Wappen und Siegel der Orte Vorarlbergs, Jahrbuch der Heraldischen Gesellschaft Adler in Vienna 1893, 22 pp. Arms of the towns in Vorarlberg State.
- Deutsche Wappenrolle, Wappen von Deutschen Reiches und seiner Bundesstaaten. Deutsche Wappenrolle enthaltend alle Wappen, Standarten, Flaggen, Landesfarben und Kokarden des Deutschen Reiches, seiner Bundesstaaten und regierenden Dynastien, Julius Hoffmann, Stuttgart, 1897. Images can be seen here and here
- Heraldischer Atlas, Stuttgart, 1899. A large volume designed as a style guide for heraldic arts; with many illustrations.
- Oesterreichisch-Ungarische Wappenrolle: die Wappen ihrer K.u.k. Majestäten, die Wappen der durchlauchtigsten Herren Erzherzoge, die Staatswappen von Oesterreich und Ungarn, die Wappen der Kronländer und der ungarischen Comitate, die Flaggen, Fahnen und Cocarden beider Reichshälften, sowie das Wappen des souverainen Fürstenthumes Liechtenstein, Vienna 1890; reprinted and revised 1900. An Austro-Hungarian Roll of Arms. Most images can be seen here.
- Beiträge zur Geschichte der Badges: gesammelt aus den Werken englischer Heraldiker, Jahrbuch der Heraldischen Gesellschaft Adler, Vienna, 1902. On English badges.
- Städtewappen von Österreich-Ungarn, Vienna, 1904. A revised edition of the book by Karl Lind of 1885 on Austrian Hungarian city arms. For images see Hartemink, Heraldry of the World.
- Nihon moncho: Japanisches Wappenbuch, Ein Handbuch für Kunstgewerbetreibende und Sammler, Vienna, Schroll, 1906. On Japanese mon.
- Landesfarben und Kokarden: Ein Vademekum für Maler, Graphiker, Fahnenfabrikanten und Dekorateure, published by Ernst Morgenstern, Berlin 1910. On flags and banners.
- Die Entwicklung der österreichisch-ungarischen Kriegs- und Handelsflagge, Jahrbuch der Heraldischen Gesellschaft Adler, Vienna. On the development of the Austrian-Hungarian war- and trade flags.
- Die Landesfarben und Cocarden in Österreich und Deutschland, Jahrbuch der Heraldischen Gesellschaft Adler, Vienna. On the colours and banners of Austria and Germany.
- Album pontificale: Die Bildnisse der Päpste nach den Papstmedaillen. Nebst einer Wappenrolle der Päpste gezeichnet und erl. von Hugo Gerhard Ströhl, Mönchengladbach, Kühlen, 1909. A book on papal arms, written in co-operation with Josef Hergenröther.
