= List of Japanese coinage patterns =

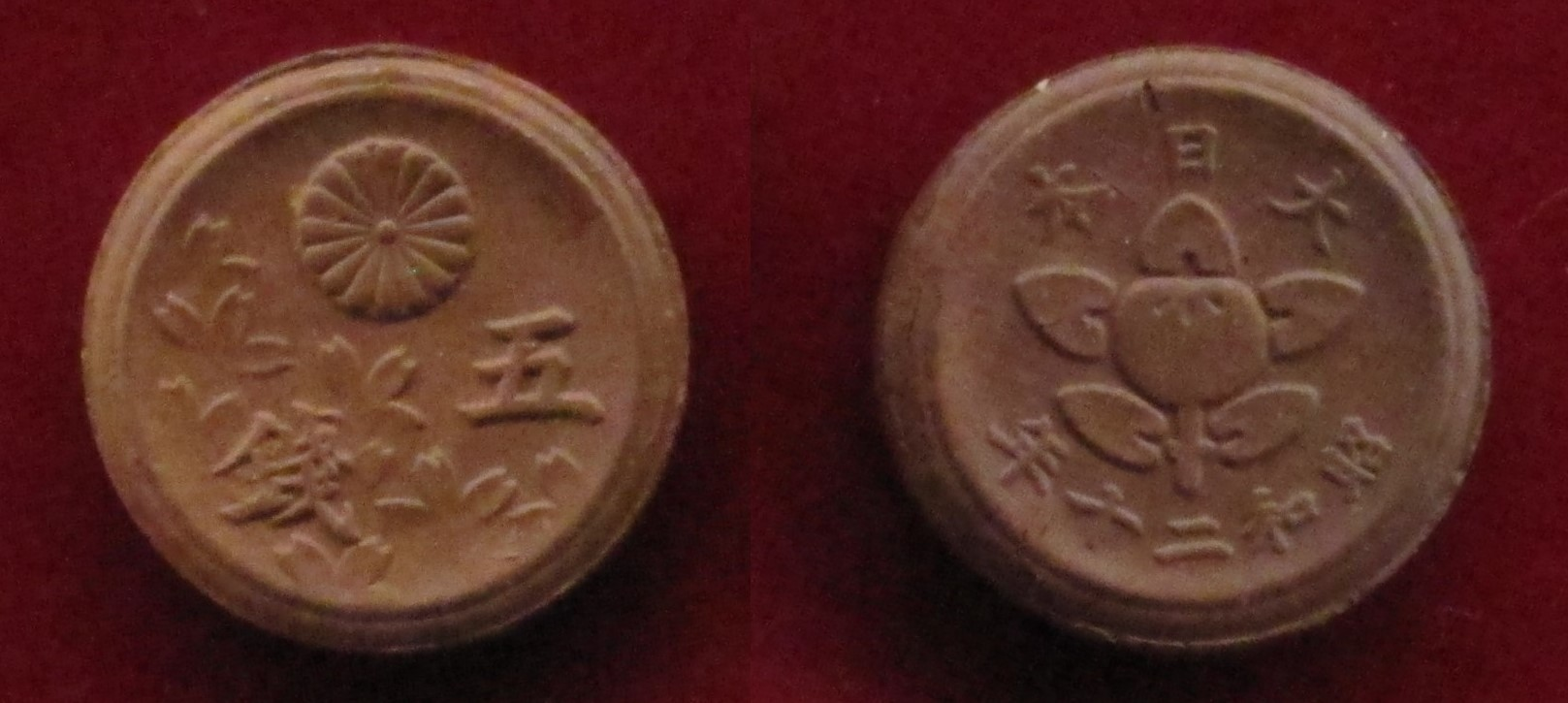
Experimental Japanese coins were struck in porcelain towards the end of World War II. These pattern coins were never issued for circulation, though some privately made ones circulated unofficially.

The following is a list of Japanese pattern coins from the yen based currency system started under the Meiji Restoration. The first patterns of the yen based system were made from 1869 to 1870 as presentation pieces to the Emperor. The new currency system was eventually adopted by the Meiji government in an Act signed on June 27, 1871. Pattern coins are almost never released into circulation as they are made for evaluation purposes only. Once a pattern is approved by government officials, it then goes to the minting process. Most of the patterns listed below are very rare, and sell for considerable amounts at auctions. The market value and rarity of any given coin is dependent on supply and demand.

== Selected terminology ==
The following terms appear on the list below:

Legend(s) – In numismatic terminology "legends" refer to inscriptions on any given coin. Common inscriptions for these coins include; "Great Japan" (大日本), the reigning Emperor's name (ex: 明治 Meiji), the value of the coin, and the year of the Emperor's reign.

Obverse/Reverse – These refer to the front (o) and back (r) side of a coin.

Struck/Strike – This is part of the minting process.

Variety – Coins struck with minor changes to their initial design are called "varieties".

== Meiji ==
- Note: Early Japanese coins are read clockwise from right to left, while modern coins are read counterclockwise from right to left.

=== Early proposals ===
Denomination	Year of reign	Japanese date	Gregorian date	Name (Note: The codes given for the "name" are catalog numbers used by major coin grading services. These numbers are shared with other currencies, and are only distinct by adding Japan (日本) (or formerly: 日本国) when looking them up for reference.)	Description
1 Fun	2nd	二 (undated)	1869 (undated)	KM-Pn2	The obverse (front) side of this coin has two crossed Japanese flags on poles with Mount Fuji in the background, while the reverse (back) side shows the coin's value. This pattern was struck in copper, and holed in the center.
5 Fun	2nd	二 (undated)	1869 (undated)	KM-Pn3	Obverse has two crossed Japanese flags on poles with Mount Fuji in the background, while the reverse shows the coin's value. This pattern was struck in copper, and is holed in the center. Only 2 coins have been certified as genuine by PCGS, while a 3rd resides in the Smithsonian Institution.
1 Momme	2nd	二 (undated)	1869 (undated)	KM-Pn4	Obverse has two crossed Japanese flags on poles with Mount Fuji in the background, while the reverse shows the coin's value. This pattern was struck in copper, and is holed in the center. An example sold for 182,000 (JPY) at auction in 2018.

=== Rin ===
Denomination	Year of reign	Japanese date	Gregorian date	Name	Description
1 Rin	2nd	二 (undated)	1869 (undated)	KM-Pn5	This pattern is holed in the middle with a sunburst design on both sides pointing outwards from the center. The Emperor's name is on the obverse, and "1 RIN" in Kanji on the reverse. The coin is described as "extremely rare" by Heritage Auctions.
1 Rin	3rd	三	1870	KM-Pn7	The obverse features the Chrysanthemum seal in its center surrounded by the Emperor's name and legends. The reverse has a sunburst on it with the value "1 RIN" in Kanji. This coin is described as "very rare".
1 Rin	6th	六	1873	KM-Pn21	Virtually identical to the adopted Rin design, the main difference being "1 MIL" instead of "1 RIN" in arabic. This coin is described as "extremely rare" by the American Numismatic Society.
2 Rin	18th	八十	1885	KM-Pn27	Virtually identical to the adopted Rin design. The main differences include "2 RIN" instead of "1 RIN" in Arabic, and 2 lines (二) above the Japanese symbol for Rin (厘) on the reverse. This coin has been described as a "rare pattern" by Heritage Auctions.
5 Rin	32nd	二十三	1899	KM-Pn30	The obverse features a paulownia crest within a wreath above the chrysanthemum seal. The reverse has the value written in Kanji within a beaded circle. "5 RIN" is written in Arabic around this circle alongside other legends. This coin is described as "extremely rare" by Heritage Auctions.
5 Rin	39th	九十三	1906	KM-Pn33	Unknown design struck in copper.
5 Rin	42nd	二十四	1909	KM-Pn35	This pattern is virtually identical to the 1899 dated 5 rin pattern (KM-Pn30), except the reverted obverse has the chrysanthemum seal appear at the top. One example was donated to the ANS in 1983.

=== Sen ===
Denomination	Year of reign	Japanese date	Gregorian date	Name	Description
1/2s – (Half sen)	3rd	三	1870	KM-Pn8	The obverse is virtually identical to the adopted design, but "1/2 SEN" is written in Kanji (半銭). (Note: The design of the dragon in the beaded circle was altered for the final adopted coin.) The reverse features a sunburst design in a beaded circle surrounded by legends next to the Chrysanthemum Seal above, and a decorative wreath below. These coins found their way into circulation making the few survivors well worn.
1 Sen	2nd	二	1869	KM-Pn6	The obverse is virtually identical to the 1st adopted design, but "1 SEN" is written in Kanji. The reverse features a sunburst design with the inscription "Exchange 100 coins for 1 Yen" (圓ー換枚百以) written in Kanji. This coin is described as "very rare" by Heritage Auctions.
1 Sen	3rd	三	1870	KM-Pn9	The obverse of this pattern is the same as the preceding one, with a reverse similar to KM-Pn8. One of these coins sold for $15,600 (USD) at auction in March, 2019.
1 Sen	10th	十	1877	KM-PnA27	Not much is known about this pattern other than a dragon design which is featured on the obverse. This particular coin was minted in silver, while all the other sen coins of the Meiji era were struck in copper.
1 Sen	39th	九十三	1906	Unlisted	Virtually identical to the adopted second "1 sen" design, this "extremely rare" coin was struck in aluminum. No "1 sen" coins were struck for circulation during this year, only a few known copper issues were struck as Proofs.
1 Sen	41st	一十四	1908	KM-Pn34	This pattern is holed in the center, with the obverse featuring a wreath and "1 SEN" written in Kanji. The reverse has a sunburst which surrounds the central hole, legends and "1 SEN" are written in Arabic around the sunburst.
1 Sen	44th	四十四	1911	KM-Pn36	The design for this copper coin is unknown.
1 Sen	44th	四十四	1911	KM-Pn37	Obverse features a wreath with "1 SEN" written in Kanji, while the reverse features a large sunburst with legends surrounding it. "1 SEN" is written in Arabic at the bottom.
5 Sen	21st	一十二	1888	KM-Pn28	Similar to the 4th adopted 5 sen design used in the following year (1889). This pattern is described as "extremely rare" by Heritage Auctions, and an example sold for $9,200 at auction in 2011.
5 Sen	28th	八十二	1895	KM-Pn29	This copper nickel pattern has a sunburst in a circle surrounded by legends and "5 SEN" written both in Arabic and Kanji on the obverse. The reverse meanwhile features a symbol within a wreath. Both sides of the coin additionally feature a rope design near the border rim.

=== Yen ===
Denomination	Year of reign	Japanese date	Gregorian date	Name	Description
1/20 yen	3rd	三	1870	KM-Pn10	Almost nothing about this coin is known other than it's white metal alloy. The adoption of a 1/20 yen coin would have made it the lowest ever valued in Yen. It was ultimately rejected in favor of the 5 sen coin.
1/10 yen	3rd	三	1870	KM-Pn11; KM-Pn12	The design of this coin is unknown. Two varieties were struck, one in copper and the other in white metal. Both were rejected in favor of the 10 sen coin.
1/4 yen	3rd	三	1870	KM-Pn13; KM-Pn14	The design of this coin is unknown. Two varieties were struck, one in copper and the other in white metal. While these coins were rejected, another proposal was made during the Taishō era for a 25 sen coin.
1/2 yen	3rd	三	1870	KM-Pn15	The obverse of this copper coin is virtually identical to the adopted 1st silver yen design. The reverse features a sunburst surrounded by a floral pattern towards the rim. The half yen coin was rejected in favor of the 50 sen coin.
1 yen	3rd	三	1870	KM-Pn16 (Note: Two sub-varieties exist, one privately struck and the other a local copy.)	Virtually identical to the adopted 1st silver yen design. “Only a handful of examples extant,” one such coin sold for $195,500 (USD) in 2011.
1 yen	6th	六	1873	KM-Pn22	Virtually identical to the adopted 2nd silver yen design. The main difference is "1873" written in Arabic below the reverse bow.
1 yen	7th	七	1874	KM-Pn23	Virtually identical to the adopted 2nd silver design.
1 yen	34th	四十三	1901	KM-Pn31	The obverse has a sunburst surrounded by a circle with legends around it, "1 YEN" is in Arabic. There is nothing on the reverse except 1 Yen written in Kanji. This coin was struck in copper.
1 yen	34th	四十三	1901	KM-Pn32	Obverse has the value written in Kanji within a wreath, and has a chrysanthemum seal located above. The reverse features a sunburst surrounded by a circle with legends around it which include "1 YEN" in Arabic. One example of this rare coin sold for $80,500 (USD) in 2011.
2 1/2 yen	3rd	三	1870	KM-Pn17	This rejected proposed pattern was struck in both gold and copper. While the gold design for this coin is unknown, at least one copper example survived with a design similar to KM-Pn15.
5 yen	3rd	三	1870	KM-Pn18	Struck in gold, design unknown.
5 yen	7th	七	1874	KM-Pn26	The obverse features a dragon with legends around the border, on the reverse is a sunburst crest superimposed on the sacred mirror within the wreath. The chrysanthemum seal is located above this design.
10 yen	3rd	三	1870	KM-Pn19	Virtually identical to the 1st adopted 10 yen design. An example of this coin sold for $276,000 (USD) in 2011, only 3 examples (total) are known.
10 yen	3rd	三	1870	KM-Pn20	Struck in gold, design unknown. This coin is possibly non-extant given the status of the previous pattern.

=== Trade dollars ===
Year of reign	Japanese date	Gregorian date	Name	Description
7th	七	1874	KM-Pn24	This pattern features the final accepted design used to strike trade dollars from 1875 to 1877. Very few of these coins are known.
7th	七	1874	KM-Pn25	The obverse is similar to the adopted trade dollar design, but there is no beaded circle around the dragon. Other differences include "420 GRAINS. 900 FINE" being under the dragon rather than around the rim with "TRADE DOLLAR", and larger inscriptions. The reverse side is virtually identical to the adopted reverse design (Value within wreath, chrysanthemum above). This pattern is described as "very rare" as only a few pieces are known to have survived.

== Taishō ==
- Note: Early Japanese coins are read clockwise from right to left, while modern coins are read counterclockwise from right to left.

=== Rin and Sen ===
Denomination	Year of reign	Japanese date	Gregorian date	Name	Description
5 Rin	5th	五	1916	KM-Pn39	This pattern was struck in copper. The obverse features the value within a circle surrounded by a floral wreath, the reverse features a sunburst with legends. Another variety shows the value within a circle surrounded by legends with 5 RIN written in Kanji, the reverse is a simple sunburst.
5 Rin	5th	五	1916	KM-Pn40	This pattern was struck in copper. The obverse features a large paulownia crest in the center flanked by cherry blossoms, the reverse has the value within a circle surrounded by legends. An example sold for 210,000 (JPY) in 2017.
1 Sen	4th	四	1915	KM-Pn38	The obverse features the value flanked by a floral design which includes the paulownia crest featured below. The reverse includes the legends with the value written as "1 Sn." all imposed over a sunburst design. One or both sides of this coin has a decorated rim. Described as "rare" by Heritage Auctions.
1 Sen	5th	五	1916	KM-Pn41	The obverse features a sunburst, while the reverse has the value within a circle surrounded by the legends. An example sold for $12,650 (USD) in 2011.
1 Sen	5th	五	1916	KM-Pn42	Virtually identical to the adopted 1 sen design with minor differences. (Note: An example being the absence of two small flowers on the obverse.) Only one "1 sen" design was issued for circulation during Taishō's reign.
1 Sen	5th	五	1916	KM-Pn43	The obverse is ornamental with the value superimposed on the sacred mirror with the chrysanthemum seal featured above. The reverse is identical to the one used on KM-Pn38. This coin is described as "rare" by Heritage Auctions. (Note: Heritage Auctions uses the wrong first image for the coin, the correct coin is shown in its holder in the 2nd image provided by H.A.)
5 Sen	5th	五	1916	KM-Pn44	Similar to the adopted 5 sen design. Only one "5 sen" design was issued for circulation during Taishō's reign, and all were struck in copper-nickel. An example sold for $26,450 (USD) in 2011.
10 Sen	7th	七	1918	KM-Pn45 (Note: It's possible that this was an issue that was originally meant for general circulation, but was ultimately abandoned for unknown reasons.)	The obverse features the value in Kanji flanked by two birds with chrysanthemum seal above. (Note: The obverse is very similar to the adopted second 50 sen design during Taishō's reign.) The reverse has a sunburst with a bird in the center surrounded by legends including "10 SEN" written in Arabic. Only a few pieces are known, an example sold for $11,500 (USD) in 2011.
10 Sen	8th	八	1919	KM-Pn49	Virtually identical to KM-Pn45 with minor detail changes, this pattern is described as "Extremely rare" by Heritage Auctions.
20 Sen	7th	七	1918	KM-Pn46	The obverse features the value in Kanji flanked by two birds with chrysanthemum seal above. The reverse has a sunburst with a bird in the center surrounded by legends including "20 SEN" written in Arabic. A very rare example dated 1920 (year 9) also exists which is counter stamped "mihon" (specimen).
20 Sen	8th	八	1919	KM-Pn50	The design for this pattern is unknown, it was struck in silver.
20 Sen	8th	八	1919	KM-Pn51	The design for this pattern is unknown, it was struck in silver.
20 Sen	10th	十	1921	KM-Pn54	The design for this pattern is similar to KM-Pn46, and is also counter stamped "mihon" (specimen). Both of these patterns are described as "very rare".
25 Sen	9th	九	1920	KM-Pn52	The design was struck in silver, and is similar in design to KM-Pn46 with "25 SEN" now written in Arabic. Like the others this "very rare" coin is also counter stamped "mihon" (specimen). This was the final attempt at proposing a coin equal to a quarter yen.
50 Sen	7th	七	1918	KM-Pn47	The obverse features the value in Kanji flanked by two birds with chrysanthemum seal above. The reverse has a sunburst surrounded by legends including "50 SEN" written in Arabic. Like the previous coins, this "very rare" pattern is counter stamped "mihon" (specimen).
50 Sen	7th	七	1918	KM-Pn48	The obverse features the value in a beaded circle surrounded by a wreath with chrysanthemum seal above. The reverse has a sunburst with legends surrounding it.
50 Sen	9th	九	1920	KM-Pn53	The design for this pattern is unknown, it was struck in silver.
50 Sen	12th	十二	1923	KM-Pn55	Virtually identical to the adopted 50 sen 2nd design. The main difference being the coin is struck in tin rather than silver.
50 Sen	15th	五十	1926	KM-Pn56	While the obverse design is unknown, the reverse features the value flanked by a floral design with other legends on the top and bottom. This coin was struck in tin rather than silver.

== Shōwa ==
- Note: Early Japanese coins (until 1945–1946) are read clockwise from right to left, while modern coins are read counterclockwise from right to left.

=== Sen ===
Denomination	Year of reign	Japanese date	Gregorian date	Name	Description
1 Sen	13th	三十	1938	KM-Pn66	Obverse has the value surrounded by a floral wreath with the Chrysanthemum seal featured above. The reverse features a bird within a circle surrounded by legends. This pattern was struck in aluminum.
1 Sen	18th (undated)	八十 (undated)	1943 (Dated: 2603)	KM-Pn70	This pattern coin was struck in a tin alloy, and was intended for later use in occupied territories. The obverse features a puppet head, while on the reverse are the legends, date, and a large "1" (1 sen).
1 Sen	18th	八十	1943	KM-Pn71	Unknown design struck in fiber, this was intended to be used as occupation coinage.
1 Sen	20th	十二	1945	KM-Pn73	Identical to the final 1 sen design that was made for circulation in 1945. The only difference is that this pattern was struck in brass rather than tin and zinc.
1 Sen	20th	十二	1945	KM-Pn74	All of these patterns were struck in porcelain, and have numerous different designs. (Note: Porcelain sen patterns differ from clay baked coins which circulated unofficially.) Common themes include the Chrysanthemum seal, paulownia crest, and legends which include the value. At least 3 examples have been graded by PCGS.
1 Sen	20th	十二	1945	KM-Pn75	All of these patterns were struck in porcelain, and have numerous different designs. The same applies here with regards to the design features, at least 2 have been graded by PCGS.
1 Sen	20th	十二	1945	KM-PnA74	The obverse features a small sunburst, while the obverse has the value 1 SEN written in Kanji. This coin does not have the Emperor's name nor seal on it, and was struck in porcelain.
5 Sen	8th	八	1933	KM-Pn62	This holed pattern was struck in nickel. On the obverse is a garnished center with legends including two small flowers. The reverse features an Imperial eagle at the bottom, the value written in kanji towards the top, and the Chrysanthemum seal at the top. Described as "extremely rare" by Heritage Auctions.
5 Sen	12th	二十	1937	KM-Pn64	Unknown design struck in brass.
5 Sen	13th	三十	1938	KM-Pn67	Nothing is known about this coin other than the value and date.
5 Sen	18th (undated)	八十 (undated)	1943 (Dated: 2603)	KM-Pn72	This tin alloy struck pattern was intended for later use in occupied territories. The obverse features a stick puppet, on the reverse are the legends, date, and a large "5" (5 sen).
5 Sen	20th	十二	1945	KM-Pn76	All of these patterns were struck in porcelain, and have numerous different designs. Common themes include the Chrysanthemum seal, paulownia crest, and legends which include the value.
5 Sen	20th	十二	1945	KM-Pn77	All of these patterns were struck in porcelain, and have numerous different designs.
10 Sen	8th	八	1933	KM-Pn63	More than one variety exists for this pattern which uses elements of the adopted design. Described as "extremely rare" by Heritage Auctions.
10 Sen	12th	二十	1937	KM-Pn65	Unknown design struck in brass.
10 Sen	13th	三十	1938	KM-Pn68	Nothing is known about this coin other than the value and date.
10 Sen	18th (undated)	八十 (undated)	1943 (Dated: 2603)	KM-PnA73	This silver struck pattern coin was intended for later use in occupied territories. The obverse features a stick puppet, on the reverse are the legends, date, and a large "10" (10 sen). An example sold for $12,650 (USD) in 2011.
10 Sen	20th	十二	1945	KM-Pn78	All of these patterns were struck in porcelain, and have numerous different designs. Common themes include the Chrysanthemum seal, paulownia crest, and legends which include the value.
10 Sen	20th	十二	1945	KM-Pn79	All of these patterns were struck in porcelain, and have numerous different designs. At least 1 example has been graded by PCGS.
10 Sen	21st	一十二	1946	KM-Pn80 (Note: This pattern coin may have been intended for circulation as allegedly bags of these coins were witnessed at the mint. Two examples were said to have been given to collectors before the rest were melted.)	Virtually identical to the final adopted 10 sen design, but struck in brass (small sized). Only a few pieces are known to have survived.
50 Sen	2nd	二	1927	KM-Pn57	Obverse design is virtually identical to the adopted 50 sen version (two birds). The reverse has an empty circle in the center surrounded by legends. This pattern was struck in brass.
50 Sen	2nd	二	1927	KM-Pn58	Unknown design struck in silver.
50 Sen	2nd	二	1927	KM-Pn59	Obverse design is virtually identical to the adopted 50 sen version (two birds). The reverse has an empty center, with legends below and a wheat stalk above. This pattern was struck in brass.
50 Sen	2nd	二	1927	KM-Pn60	Unknown design struck in silver.
50 Sen	3rd	三	1928	KM-Pn61	Unknown design struck in tin.
50 Sen	13th	三十	1938	KM-Pn69	Virtually identical to the 1st adopted 50 sen design (two birds) under Shōwa. This pattern was struck in "white metal" and "aluminum" rather than the circulation issued silver alloy. The total mintage of these coins remains unknown.

=== Yen ===
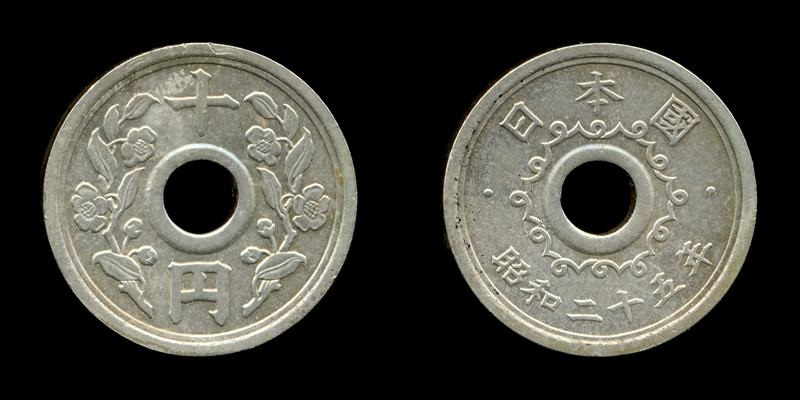
KM-Pn83 (shown here) and KM-Pn85 were struck but never released.

Denomination	Year of reign	Japanese date	Gregorian date	Name	Description
1 yen	25th	二十五	1950	Unlisted	Virtually identical to the first adopted modern 1 yen design (1948 to 1950), but struck in aluminum instead of brass. (Note: These pattern coins were made for the aluminum 1 Yen issues that began production in 1955.)
1 yen	25th	二十五	1950	KM-Pn81	Unknown design struck in brass.
5 yen	26th	二十六	1951	KM-Pn84	Virtually identical to the adopted 5 yen "old script" design, but struck in aluminum. This coin is described as "very rare" by Heritage Auctions.
5 yen	33rd	三十三	1958	KM-Pn86	Virtually identical to the adopted 2nd design which uses an "old script" for the value. There are added Japanese characters on the reverse side (gear design around hole).
10 yen	25th	二十五	1950	KM-Pn82	Unknown design struck in aluminum.
10 yen	25th	二十五	1950	KM-Pn83	The obverse features the value flanked by a floral design, the reverse has legends surrounded by a decorative center. This pattern coin was struck in copper-nickel and is holed in the middle. An example sold for $2,530 (USD) in 2011.
10 yen	26th	二十六	1951	KM-Pn85	The obverse features the value flanked by a floral design, the reverse has legends surrounded by a decorative center. This pattern coin was struck in copper-nickel and is holed in the middle. An example sold for $2,990 (USD) in 2011.
