= 10 sen coin =

Former Japanese coin

Ten Sen
- Japan
- Value: 1/10 Japanese Yen
- Shape: circular
- Composition: Several different metals
- Years of minting: 1870–1946

Obverse
- Design: Various, depending on year.

Reverse
- Design: Various, depending on year.

The 10 sen coin (十銭硬貨) was a Japanese coin worth one tenth of a Japanese yen, as 100 sen equalled 1 yen. These coins were minted from the late 19th century up until the end of World War II.

== History ==
=== Meiji coinage (1870–1912) ===
Ten sen coins were first struck towards the end of 1870 (year 3 of Meiji) from a newly established mint at Osaka. Initially, this process was done by engineers from the United Kingdom as Japan did not have the technology or raw materials to manufacture new coins. Authorization was given to strike ten sen coins in .800 silver, weighs 38.6 grains (2.5g), and has a 18.28mm diameter (0.72 in). (Note: Modern sourcing places the diameter at 17.57mm (0.69 in)) The first design used is nicknamed rising sun dragon (旭日竜, Asahi Ryu), which had its features engraved by a commission of Japanese artists. The obverse side features a dragon with an open mouth, while on the reverse there is a paulownia decoration with a sunburst in the center, and the chrysanthemum seal up on top. While dated 1870 (year 3), these first year ten sen coins were not released into circulation until the following year (1871). During this time, the coins along with twelve other denominations were adopted by the Meiji government in an act signed on June 27, 1871. This newly adopted coinage gave Japan a western style decimal system based on units of yen, which were broken down into subsidiary currency of sen, and rin. Ten sen coins were set as legal tender only up to the amount of 10 yen which was fixed by government regulations. An issue soon arose when the weight of silver ten sen coins per face value became too light in regard to the higher valued silver 1 yen coin. An amendment to the currency act (Daijo-kan Declaration No. 74) was adopted in March 1872 (year 5) which intended to increase the weight of the ten sen coin. This action was never carried out, and the currency act was amended again in the following year.

Changes in weight and design features of the ten sen coin was implemented in 1873 (year 6). While their diameter remained the same, the coins had their weight increased to 41.6 grains (2.69 grams) as proposed in Declaration No. 74. The second used design has a "western style" medallic orientation, with 10 SEN in Arabic below the dragon on the obverse side. On the reverse are leaves of paulownia and a chrysanthemum seal up on top with the value "10 sen" written in Kanji. Ten sen coins continued to be minted with this design until at least June 30, 1879. (Note: Apparently, coins dated 1877 (year 10 of Meiji) were produced in 1878 and 1879.) Only proof strikes were made for coins dated 1880 (year 13) for exclusive use in presentation sets. Production resumed in 1885 (year 18) and continued through 1897 (year 30). While Japan officially went onto the gold standard during this year via the coinage act of 1897 (Meiji 30 Law No. 16), this had no effect on the ten sen coin which continued to be produced unchanged until 1906 (year 39). An amendment to the 1897 coinage act was implemented this year which gave ten, twenty, and fifty sen coins new designs. This replaced the second dragon design which had been in place for 33 years. (Note: The second ten sen dragon design lasted the longest of all modern-day yen when excluding currently issued postwar currency.)

The third ten sen design features a wreath on the obverse with the value written in kanji in the center, and a sunburst surrounded by flowers on the opposite side (reverse). Almost immediately there was a problem during the design transition when the market price of silver exceeded the face value of the ten sen coin. Coins dated 1906 (year 39) were originally made using two different designs. The second older dragon design was used for coins produced until March, while the newly adopted third design was used for coins produced from June 1906 to January 1907. The latter of these coins had been distributed to the banks but not released yet when another amendment to the coinage act was made in March 1907. Ten sen coins by law had their silver content lowered from .800 to .720, and their weight from 2.7 to 2.3 grams. The 1906 dated coins which had been minted using the third design were all melted except for one which is preserved at the Japan Mint. Adjusted coins with the third design were finally released into circulation when 1907 (year 40) dated coins were produced in August of that year. These continued to be minted until the death of Emperor Meiji in 1912 (year 45).

=== Taishō coinage (1912–1926) ===
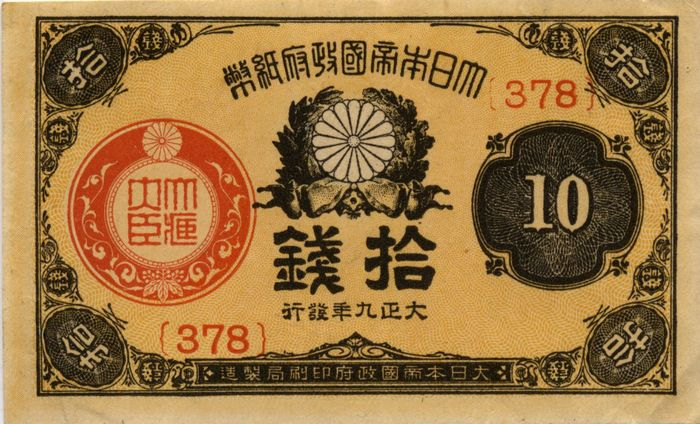
Taishō era 10 sen notes were originally intended to be exchanged for silver.

Production resumed under Emperor Taishō in 1912 and World War I broke out two years later. This event brought Japan a booming economy which required an increase of small denomination coins. Unfortunately, rising silver bullion costs to produce ten sen coins also became an issue again. Ten sen coins were struck in silver until the end of 1917 (Taishō year 6), when an announcement was made to replace the coins with fractional bank notes. The coinage act of 1897 was amended again and went into effect on May 1, 1918, providing coinage as needed. Ten sen coins dated 1918 to 1922 (year 7 to 11) were produced in silver under this amendment and stored at the Bank of Japan. For reasons unknown these coins were never exchanged for ten sen notes, and possible reasoning depends on the literature used. It remains debatable if these coins were ever meant for circulation at all as they could have been intended as trial or pattern strikes. Most of these were eventually melted down at the mint into bullion and shipped overseas by 1923 (year 12) leaving ten examples behind at the mint.

Ten sen copper nickel coins were authorized by the Imperial ordinance of August 26, 1920. These coins weigh 57.86 grains (3.75g), have a 22.12 mm diameter, and a 4.55 mm central hole. The chosen design features a chrysanthemum seal, and a bouquet of paulownia flowers on the obverse, while the reverse side uses Qinghai waves. This same ordinance also reduced the size of the 5 sen coin due to public complaints regarding the similarity of the two coins. Ten sen copper nickel coins were eventually produced in large amounts which peaked in 1922 and 1923 (year 11 and 12). This was done to encourage the public to redeem old ten sen notes for coins, which lasted into the Shōwa era. No additional changes regarding ten sen coins were made during the remainder of Emperor Taishō's reign.

=== Shōwa coinage (1927–1946) ===
Copper nickel ten sen coins resumed production in 1927 (year 2 of Shōwa) and continued to be minted until 1932 (year 7). The "1897 coinage act" was then amended or a final time for political reasons in 1933 which left an impact on the series. The width of ten sen coins dropped slightly by 0.1mm to 22mm, and the weight was increased from 3.8 to 4 grams. Pure nickel was chosen as an alloy as an anti-counterfeiting measure because it was difficult to process with the technology of the time. Another reason has to do with the Mukden Incident in 1931 (year 6), and subsequent Japanese invasion of Manchuria. Nickel was being stockpiled as the metal was not produced in Japan, and could be used in the event of a larger conflict. The design of the nickel coins was chosen based on ideas solicited from the general public, and pattern coins were made. This design features the chrysanthemum seal and paulownia surrounded by arabesque on the obverse, while the reverse features a Qinghai wave design. These pure nickel coins substituted the old copper-nickel coins starting on April 1, 1933 (year 8). Production continued for another four years before the Second Sino-Japanese War broke out in July 1937 (year 12).

The National Mobilization Law was legislated in the Diet of Japan by Prime Minister Fumimaro Konoe on March 24, 1938, to prepare the country for war. This action led to the promulgation of the "Temporary Currency Law" which came into effect on June 1, 1938. It now became possible to change the material and purity of money without a resolution from the Imperial Diet. An aluminium bronze alloy consisting of 95% copper and 5% aluminium thus replaced ten sen nickel coins as nickel was needed for munitions. The only changes made to the coins other than their alloy was a new design and a smaller central hole. Waves along with a sunburst and chrysanthemum seal were chosen for the obverse, while the reverse features a grooved cherry blossom design with paulownia. These coins were only produced for two years before an increased wartime demand for copper caused another alloy change. Ten sen coins were switched to a pure aluminum alloy on March 28, 1940 (year 15) by Royal Decree No. 113. The size of the coins remained the same, while the light aluminum alloy cut the weight of the coins by more than half from 4 to 1.5 grams. These coins feature a chrysanthemum seal with leaves on the obverse, and a cherry blossom design on the reverse.

As the war situation grew worse for Japan, more aluminum was needed for aircraft. Ten sen coins had their weight lowered from 1.5 to 1.2 grams on August 27, 1941, by Royal Decree No. 826 to meet this demand. Things only deteriorated further when the Second Sino-Japanese War became the broader Pacific War three months later. The Japanese government eventually withdrew nickel and copper ten sen coins from circulation in December 1942, and exchanged them for aluminum ones. On February 5, 1943, by Royal Decree No. 60, more aluminum was taken out of ten sen coins by lowering their weight from 1.2 to 1 gram as the metal became difficult to obtain. An announcement by the Japanese government was eventually made in April 1943 regarding plans to replace aluminum coinage with tin. Aluminum was officially abolished for coinage by the end of the year in favor of the new alternate alloy. One of the main reasons for using tin centered around it being relatively easy to obtain from occupied territories in Southeast Asia. The decision was not made lightly, as tin was a strategic material which is unsuitable for monetary purposes as the metal is soft.

Ten sen coins with a tin alloy were enacted on March 8, 1944, by Royal Decree No. 388. These coins are reduced in size from 22 to 19mm, the weight was increased from 1 to 2.4 grams, and a central 5mm hole was added. The design used for these coins features a chrysanthemum seal and paulownia on the obverse, and inscriptions on the reverse. Production only occurred for a few months before being discontinued due to allied air superiority and control over the seas. The Japanese government issued Ten sen notes as a response when materials could no longer be secured for the coins. (Note: Unissued porcelain ten sen pieces were also made, but were mostly destroyed when World War II ended.) Ten sen coins were brought back into production in December 1945 and were officially enacted on January 26, 1946 (Showa 21) with an aluminum alloy. These hole-less coins are the same weight and size as the previously made final 1943 issue. The final design employs symbols of Japan with rice ears and the chrysanthemum seal on the obverse, and cherry blossoms on the reverse. It was mandated at the time by the Supreme Commander for the Allied Powers that coins read "日本政府" (Nippon-koku, Government of Japan) rather than "大日本" (Dai Nippon, Japanese Empire). Their production lasted only two years before being discontinued due to a lack of remaining wartime supplies. Ten sen coins were eventually demonetized at the end of 1953 when the Japanese government passed a law abolishing subsidiary coinage in favor of the yen. Currencies of less than one yen were rarely used by this time due to excessive post-war inflation.

== Composition and size ==
Years	Technical parameters			Edge
Years	Diameter	Mass	Composition	Edge
1870	17.57 mm	2.5 g	80% silver 20% copper	Reeded
1873-1906	17.57 mm	2.7 g	80% silver 20% copper	Reeded
1907-1917	17.57 mm	2.3 g	72% silver 28% copper	Reeded
1920–1932	22.12 mm	3.8 g	Cupronickel; 75% copper 25% nickel	Smooth
1933–1937	22.0 mm	4.0 g	100% nickel	Smooth
1938–1940	22.0 mm	4.0 g	95% copper, 5% aluminium	Smooth
1940-1941	22.0 mm	1.5 g	100% aluminium	Smooth
1941-1943	22.0 mm	1.2 g	100% aluminium	Smooth
1943	22.0 mm	1.0 g	100% aluminium	Smooth
1944	19.0 mm	2.4 g	93% tin, 7% zinc	Smooth
1945–1946	22.0 mm	1.0 g	100% aluminium	Smooth

== Circulation figures ==
=== Meiji ===
The following are circulation figures for ten sen coins that were minted between the 3rd, and the 45th year of Meiji's reign. The dates all begin with the Japanese symbol 明治 (Meiji), followed by the year of his reign the coin was minted. Each coin is read clockwise from right to left, so in the example used below "二十三" would read as "year 32" or 1899. Some of the mintages included cover more than one variety of a given coin.

- "Year" ← "Number representing year of reign" ← "Emperors name" (Ex: 年 ← 二十三 ← 治明)

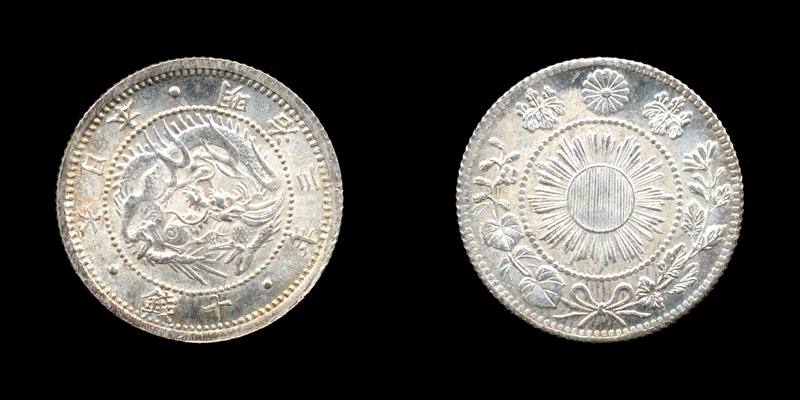
10 sen coin from 1870 (year 3) Design 1 - (1870)

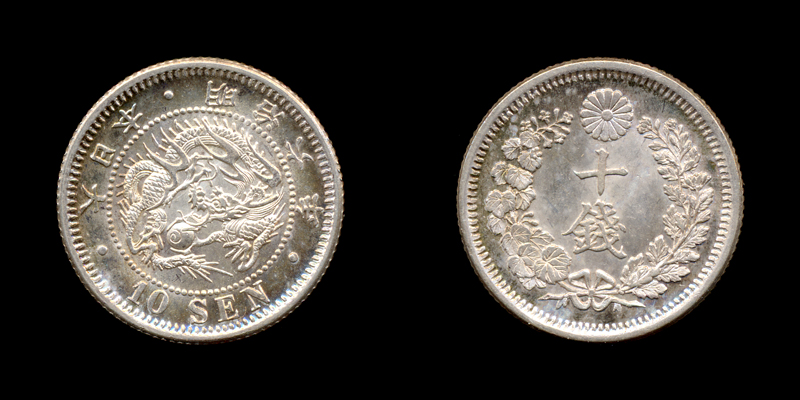
10 sen coin from 1873 (year 6) Design 2 - (1873–1906)

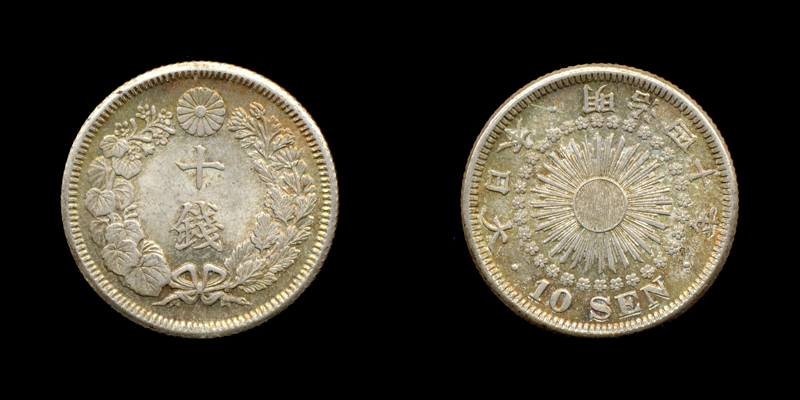
10 sen coin from 1907 (year 40) Design 3 - (1907–1912)

Year of reign	Japanese date	Gregorian date	Mintage
3rd	三	1870 (Note: Two varieties were made in 1870 in regards to the depth of the dragon's scales (shallow and deep), their mintage is combined.)	6,102,674
6th	六	1873 (Note: Two different types were made this year, their mintage is combined.)	5,109,951
7th	七	1874	10,221,571
8th	八	1875	8,977,419
9th	九	1876	11,890,000
10th	十	1877	20,352,136
13th	三十	1880	77 (Note: Not intended for circulation.)
18th	八十	1885	9,763,333
20th	十二	1887	10,421,616
21st	一十二	1888	8,177,229
24th	四十二	1891	5,000,000
25th	五十二	1892	5,000,000
26th	六十二	1893	12,000,000
27th	七十二	1894	11,000,000
28th	八十二	1895	13,719,054
29th	九十二	1896	15,080,506
30th	十三	1897	20,357,439
31st	一十三	1898	13,643,001
32nd	二十三	1899	26,216,579
33rd	三十三	1900	8,183,421
34th	四十三	1901	797,561
35th	五十三	1902	1,204,439
37th	七十三	1904	11,106,638
38th	八十三	1905	34,182,194
39th	九十三	1906	4,710,168
40th	十四	1907	12,000,000
41st	一十四	1908	12,273,239
42nd	二十四	1909	20,279,846
43rd	三十四	1910	20,339,816
44th	四十四	1911	38,729,680
45th	五十四	1912	10,755,009

=== Taishō ===
The following are circulation figures for ten sen coins that were minted between the 1st and the 15th (last) year of Taishō's reign. The dates all begin with the Japanese symbol 大正 (Taishō), followed by the year of his reign the coin was minted. Each coin is read clockwise from right to left, so in the example used below "四" would read as "year 4" or 1915.

- "Year" ← "Number representing year of reign" ← "Emperors name" (Ex: 年 ← 四 ← 正大)

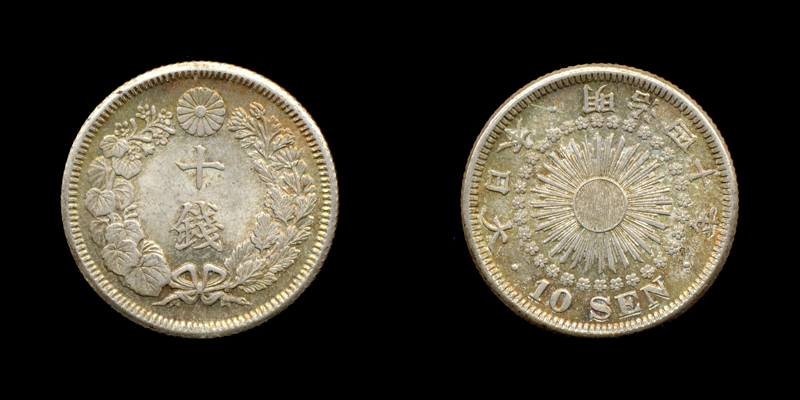
10 sen coin Design 1 - (1912–1917)

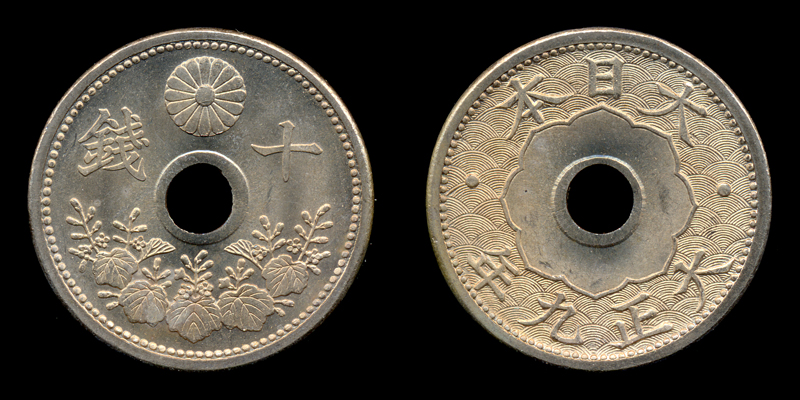
10 sen coin from 1920 (year 9) Design 2 - (1920–1926)

Year of reign	Japanese date	Gregorian date	Mintage
1st	元	1912	10,344,307
2nd	二	1913	13,321,466
3rd	三	1914	10,325,327
4th	四	1915	16,836,225
5th	五	1916	10,324,128
6th	六	1917 (First design)	35,170,906
9th	九	1920 (Second design)	4,894,420
10th	十	1921	61,870,000
11th	一十	1922	159,770,000
12th	二十	1923	190,010,000
14th	四十	1925	54,475,000
15th	五十	1926	58,675,000

=== Shōwa ===
The following are circulation figures for ten sen coins that were minted between the 2nd, and the 21st year of Emperor Shōwa's reign. The dates all begin with the Japanese symbol 昭和 (Shōwa), followed by the year of his reign the coin was minted. Each coin is read clockwise from right to left, so in the example used below "二十" would read as "year 12" or 1937. Coin patterns that include examples struck on porcelain are not included here as they were never issued for circulation.

- "Year" ← "Number representing year of reign" ← "Emperors name" (Ex: 年 ← 二十 ← 和昭)

Year of reign	Japanese date	Gregorian date	Mintage
2nd	二	1927	36,050,000
3rd	三	1928	41,450,000
4th	四	1929	10,050,000
6th	六	1931	1,850,087
7th	七	1932	23,151,177
8th	八	1933	14,570,714
9th	九	1934	37,351,832
10th	十	1935	35,586,755
11th	一十	1936	77,948,804
12th	二十	1937	40,001,969
13th	三十	1938	46,999,990
14th	四十	1939	121,500,000
15th	五十	1940 TY1 (AB)	165,000,000
15th	五十	1940 TY2 (AL)	575,600,000
16th	六十	1941 TY1	575,600,000
16th	六十	1941 TY2 (Note: Ten sen coins were minted in 1941 with weights of 1.5g, and 1.2g creating two different types for the year.)	944,900,000
17th	七十	1942	944,900,000
18th	八十	1943	944,900,000
18th	八十	1943 (Reduced weight)	756,000,000
19th	九十	1944	450,000,000
20th	十二	1945	237,590,000
21st	一十二	1946	237,590,000

== Shōwa era designs ==
Six different designs were used during the Shōwa era for the 10 sen coin, not including pattern coins which were never intended for circulation. As the weight and sizes were changed frequently after 1940, these designs have been listed separate with their respective information.

Image	Minted	Size	Weight	Comments
	1927–1932 (Year 2-7)	22.1 mm	3.8 g	This design is similar to Taishō era coins. (Taishō coin pictured)
	1933–1937 (Year 8-12)	22.0mm	4.0 g	The alloy was changed in 1933 to pure nickel.
	1938–1940 (Year 13-15)	22.0mm	4.0 g	The alloy was changed in 1938 to Aluminium bronze.
	1940–1941 (Year 15-16)	22.0mm	1.5 g	The alloy was changed in 1940 to Aluminium.
	1941–1943 (Year 16-18)	22.0mm	1.2 g	Reduced weight, all three years have a combined mintage total.
	1943 (Year 18)	22.0mm	1.0 g	Reduced weight.
	1944 (Year 19)	19.0mm	2.4 g	Reduced size, alloy changed to tin/zinc.
	1945–1946 (Year 20-21)	22.0mm	1.0 g	Final issue of the series.

== Collecting ==
The value of any given coin is determined by survivability rate and condition as collectors in general prefer uncleaned appealing coins. For this denomination, there are a few major varieties and multiple design changes which occurred during three different imperial eras. The first coins minted are Asahi Ryu or rising sun dragon coinage which only has one year (Meiji 3), but consists of two different varieties regarding scales on the dragons design. As with the other denominations, those with clear (deep) scales are worth more than obscure (shallow) ones. Overall these first year of issuance coins are "reasonably priced" with average value in the several thousands of yen. The second design was much longer lasting in comparison as it was featured on coins from 1873 to 1906 (year 6 to 39). Another similarity with other denominations occurs here with the character "明" in Meiji's name on the obverse. Coins dated 1873 and 1875 (year 6 and 8) either have both features separated as the first variety, or have a line connecting both the left and right features as the second variety. Those with the second "connected" variety are worth more than their counterparts. With a mintage of just 77 coins, ten sen coins dated 1880 (year 13) are not even listed by some Japanese price guides. They are estimated to be worth in the low millions of yen. An overall assessment on coins made from 1873 to 1906 has common dates valued at 1000 yen in average condition. Rare dates include; 1874, 1901, and 1902 (Meiji 7, 34 and 35) and are potentially worth more than 10,000 yen in average condition. The third design is used on the last of the ten sen silver coins dated from 1907 to 1917. As there are a lot of surviving coins for these dates, they are generally priced lower except for those in high grades.

Copper-nickel coins debuted under Emperor Taishō in 1920 (year 9 of Taishō) as the price of silver bullion had risen too high. The most valuable of these coins under Taishō were made during this first year. Production amounts increased afterwards for the remainder of Taishō's reign to redeem 10 sen notes, which left plenty of surviving coins for collectors to obtain. These amounts in general drop with coins produced from 1927 to 1932 (year 2–7) of the Shōwa era. When ten sen coins were switched to nickel, a lot of these may have been redeemed at the bank. Coins of this period can still be collected "relatively easily" as enough surviving coins remain. An anomaly occurs with coins dated 1929 (year 4), when compared to the much lower mintage 1931 (year 6) date in terms of value. As the number of existing coins in good condition for 1931 outnumbers those from 1929 (year 4), the latter date is valued more in higher grades. As a caveat, there were a "considerable" amount of contemporary counterfeit coins sold at the time as the value of the metal was low relative to the coin's face value.

There is nothing "particularly rare" about the nickel series issued from 1933 to 1937 (year 8 to 12) other than proof strikes which are valued in the hundreds of thousands of yen. Nickel ten sen coins are usually found in better conditions as the alloy is a stable resistant metal. Aluminum bronze coins made from 1938 to 1940 (Year 13 to 15) were released for such a short time that many of them were held on to. The aluminum coins that replaced these were produced in even larger amounts in three different varieties. Scarce 1943 (year 18) dated coins weighing 1.2 grams are the most valuable among these and carry a premium. Post-war inflation made coins produced from 1944 to 1946 (year 19 to 21) essentially worthless which gave the public no incentive to cash them in. These coins have low value as an abundance of survivors in all conditions can easily be obtained by collectors.
