= 5 sen coin =

Former Japanese coin

Five Sen
- Japan
- Value: 1/20 Japanese Yen
- Mass: (1870–1871) 1.25 g, (1873–1880) 1.35 g, (1889–1906) 4.67 g, (1917–1920) 4.28 g, (1920–1923) 2.63 g, (1932–1945) various g
- Diameter: (1870–1871) 15.5 mm, (1873–1880) 15.2 mm, (1889–1920) 20.6 mm, (1920–1923) 19.1 mm, (1932–1945) various mm
- Shape: Circular
- Composition: Several different metals
- Years of minting: 1870–1946

Obverse
- Design: Various, depending on year.

Reverse
- Design: Various, depending on year.

The 5 sen coin (五銭硬貨) was a Japanese coin worth one twentieth of a Japanese yen, as 100 sen equalled 1 yen. These coins were minted from the late 19th century until the end of World War II. Like the other denominations of sen, these coins were eventually taken out of circulation at the end of 1953. While not in circulation any more, these coins are bought and sold by numismatists for academic study, and by those with a hobby.

== History ==
=== Meiji coinage (1870–1906) ===
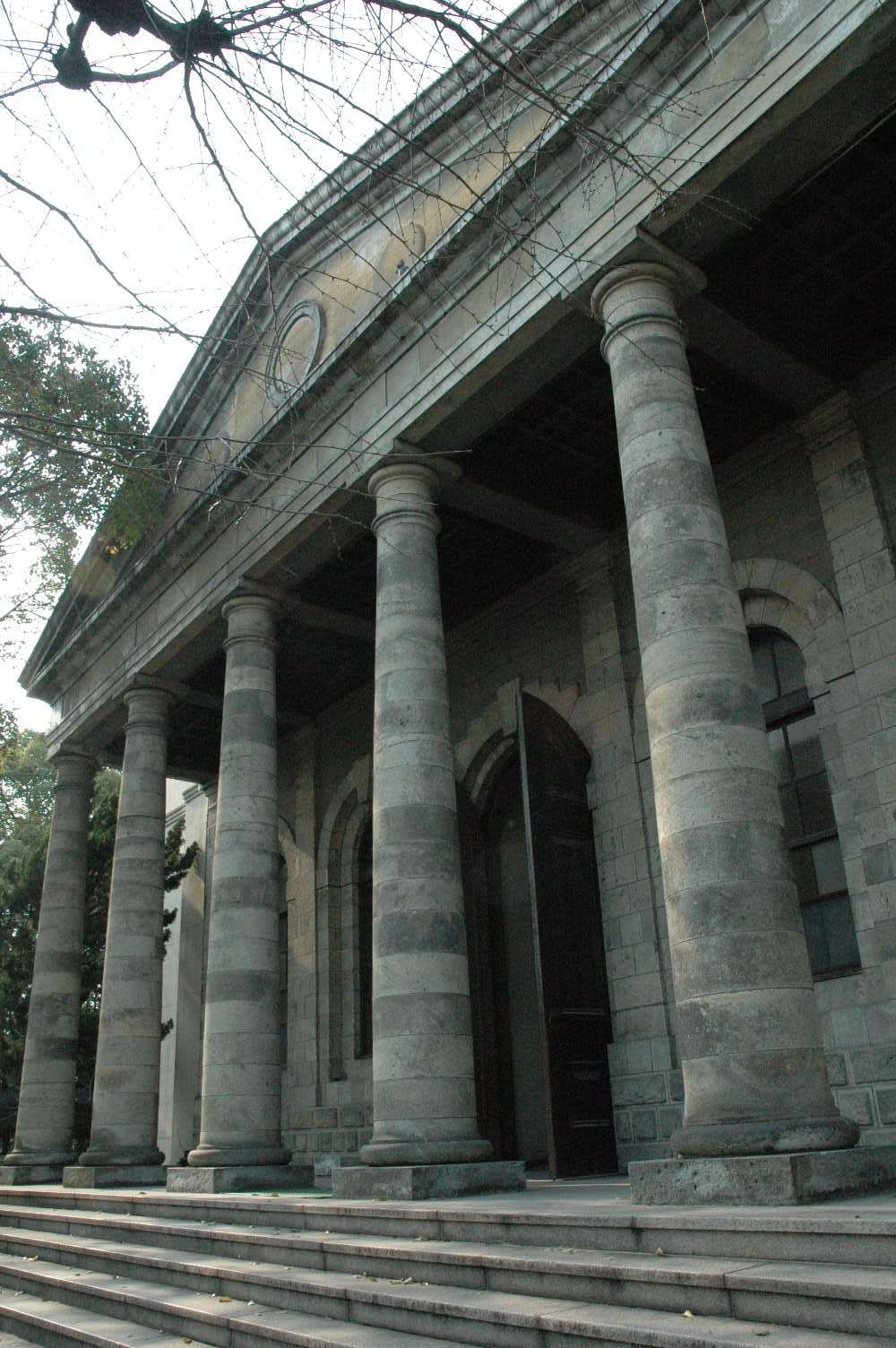
Five sen coins were first struck in 1870 at the Osaka mint (façade pictured).

Five sen coins were first struck towards the end of 1870 from a newly established mint in Osaka. They were then held at the mint until the following year of issuance when they circulated alongside newly minted 1871 (year 4) dated coins. Five sen coins along with twelve other denominations were adopted by the Meiji government in an act signed on June 27, 1871. This new coinage gave Japan a western style decimal system based on units of yen, which were broken down into subsidiary currency of sen, and rin. Five sen coins dated 1870 and 1871 (year 3 and 4 of Meiji) were initially authorized to be struck in .800 silver, weighs 19.3 grains (1.25g), and has a 15.5mm diameter (0.61 in). The first design used is called rising sun dragon (旭日竜, Asahi Ryu), which had its features engraved by a commission of Japanese artists. On the reverse side there is a paulownia decoration with a sunburst in the center along with the chrysanthemum seal up on top. This first dragon design turned out to be problematic as the thin small size of the coin meant that the dragon's features could not be fully struck. An amendment to the currency act (Daijo-kan Declaration No. 74) was adopted in March 1872, which changed the dragon to a simple "五銭" (5 sen) design. No changes were made to the weight or size of these coins when they were issued in 1872 (year 5) bearing the date from the prior year.

In early 1873 (year 6), the currency act was amended again giving five sen coins a third design. The weight of the coin was raised from 19.3 to 20.8 grains (1.35g) as the face value of the former coins were not proportional to the 1 yen coin. Five sen coins were also reduced in size from 15.5 to 15.2mm, this decision was unpopular as they were hard to use in commerce. (Note: Some older sources give a 0.56 inch diameter which places the coin at 14.2mm.) The dragon was restored to the obverse side of the coin as technical improvements from new British coin presses made a clear design. Latin script reading "5 Sen" was introduced below the dragon for internationalization and foreigners. The reverse side of the coin received a new paulownia wreath decoration, and the sunburst was replaced by the value written in Kanji. Production of the silver 5 sen coin continued until 1880 with the latter three years being dated 1877 (year 10). During their final year a few coins were struck in proof dated 1880 (year 13) for exclusive use in presentation sets. These coins were ultimately discontinued for circulation as their unpopular small size had caused them to become inconvenient. Five sen silver coins were later struck in 1892 (year 25) to have non circulating examples to display at the World's Columbian Exposition.

The Japanese government promulgated the "Additional Corrections to the Currency Regulations" (Royal Order No. 74) in November 1888 (year 21), and a new coin pattern was adopted. Cupronickel was chosen as a replacement for silver as Japan had an excess supply of copper at the time. As the coins lost their silver value, they were grouped with bronze coins which were only redeemable for up to a yen. This coin is noteworthy for being the first made by Japanese engineers using technology licensed from the United Kingdom. Five sen coins with the fourth design feature a large chrysanthemum seal on the obverse, and a large 五 (5) on the reverse. These coins are heavier and larger than their silver predecessors weighing 72 grains (4.67g) with a width of 20.6mm. Although production began in 1889 (year 22), the simple design of the coin made them a target of counterfeiters. These coins were only produced for 8 years as their fake counterparts eventually became "rampant".

When the Japanese government went onto the gold standard in 1897 a new monetary law was enacted. The design of the 5 sen coin was made more elaborate with a rice wreath on the obverse, and a sunburst on the reverse. This fifth and last design of the Meiji era would be the last time "5 Sen" was spelled out in Latin numerals. There were virtually no changes made to the size or weight of the coins which circulated concurrently with those of the older design. Five sen coins with the rice wreath design were produced for circulation until 1905 (year 38). While coins were struck the following year, none were released for circulation. The final 5 sen design used during the Meji era was noted for causing public confusion as it was similar to the concurrently circulating 20 sen design. The cupronickel bullion used was also too cheap for the coin's face value, and despite the design change was easy to forge. Five sen coins were "practically wholly" withdrawn from circulation in the years that followed as cash currency became used for only petty transactions.

=== Taishō coinage (1917–1923) ===
Five sen coins were re-established in 1916 when the 1897 monetary law was revised. Under Imperial ordinance 35 of March 30, 1916 a central hole of 4.2mm was specified for the coppernickel coins. This measure reduced production costs, avoided any future 20 sen coin confusion, and was a deterrent to counterfeiters. While there was no change in the 20.6mm width which had been used since 1889, the weight was reduced from 4.67 to 4.28 grams. At least two different coin patterns were struck before a final design was finalized. The chosen design features a chrysanthemum seal, and a bouquet of paulownia flowers on the obverse, while the reverse side uses Qinghai waves. Production began the following year with coins dated 1917 (year 6 of Taishō's reign). Inflation caused by World War I at the time had led to an overall shortage of subsidiary coins. Silver coins were suspended during this time as the alloy price continued to rise and then settle after the war. The Japanese government eventually decided to issue a coppernickel ten sen coin to save on costs. An issue arose as the size and design of the five sen coin was now virtually the same as the ten sen coin. Focus was given on size rather than design as the two denominations needed to be balanced in proportion to their face value. Five sen coins were thus reduced in size from 20.6 to 19.09mm, the weight dropped from 4.28 to 2.63 grams, the central hole shrunk, and the coins became thinner. When these coins were produced for the first time in 1920 (year 9), the redeemable limit was raised from 1 to 5 yen. Five sen coins were eventually suspended at the end of 1923 (year 12) as large amounts of ten sen coins and small denomination banknotes were circulating by this time.

=== Shōwa coinage (1932–1946) ===
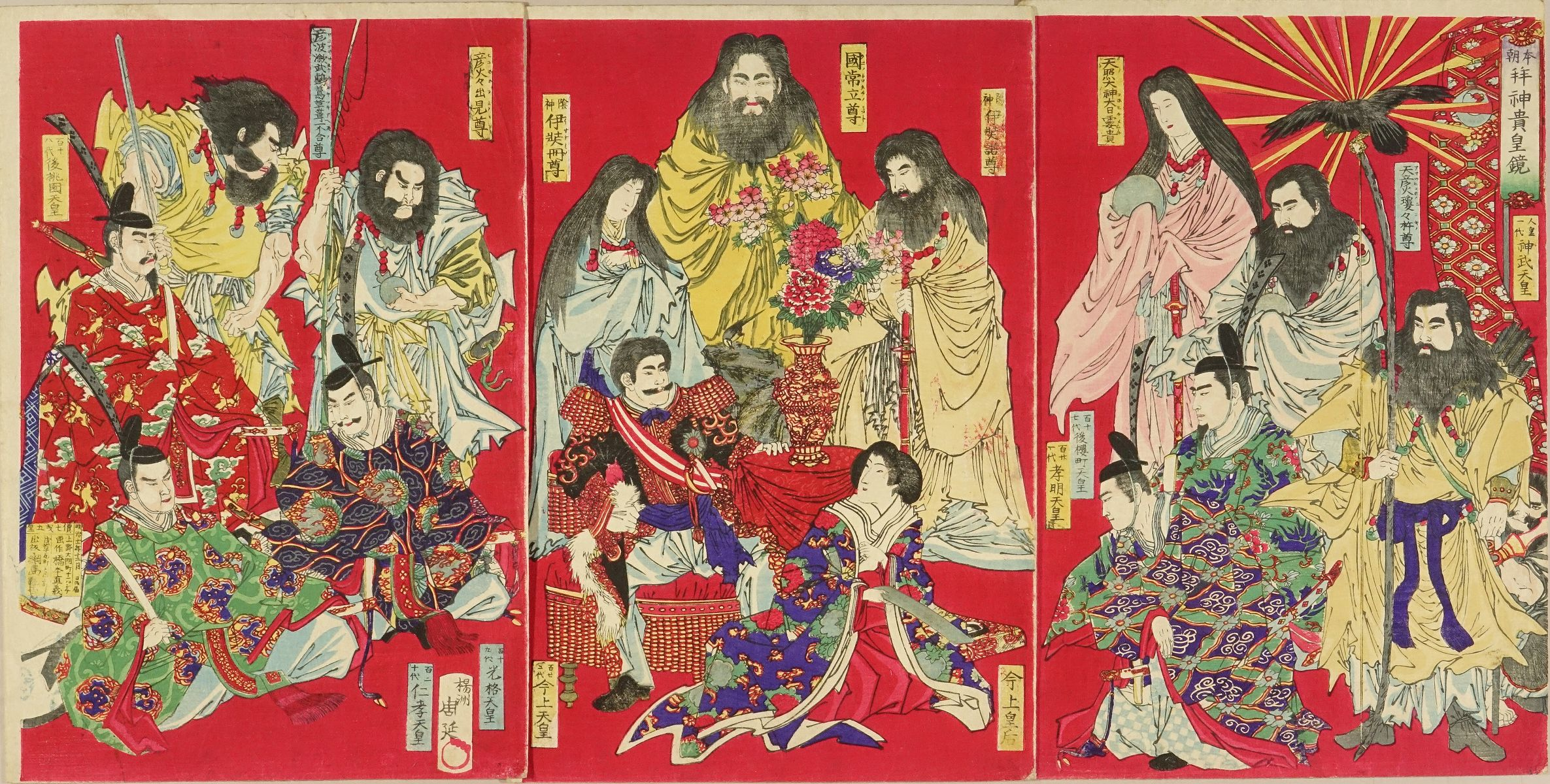
The mythical golden kite (image on right with Emperor Jimmu) is featured on two Shōwa era five sen designs.

The suspension of five sen coins outlasted Emperor Taishō and continued until 1932 (year 7 of Shōwa). Five sen coins were produced again due to the Mukden Incident and subsequent Japanese invasion of Manchuria. These events caused a shortage in coins as the demand for military supplies led to a booming economy. Amendments were made in June 1932 regarding the coinage law, and were put into effect on July 1. Copper-nickel coins from the Taishō era were brought back into production before the alloy and design were changed due to wartime conditions. The 1897 coinage act was amended for a final time in 1933 (year 8) to implement these changes. The width of the coin dropped slightly by 0.1mm to 19mm, and the weight was increased from 2.63 to 2.80 grams. Input was solicited from the general public in order to base a pattern design for these coins. The obverse features the chrysanthemum seal up on top with a kite bird below, while the reverse features eight magatama. Using a kite bird is symbolic here, as allegedly Emperor Jimmu used it to defeat his enemies in battle. Nickel was chosen for an alloy as countries at the time including Japan were stockpiling it in preparation for war. These pure nickel coins substituted the old copper-nickel coins starting on April 1, 1933. Production continued for another four years before the Second Sino-Japanese War broke out with the Marco Polo Bridge Incident in July 1937. This event left an impact on how five sen coins were made for the rest of the series.

The National Mobilization Law was legislated in the Diet of Japan by Prime Minister Fumimaro Konoe on March 24, 1938 to prepare the country for war. This action led to the promulgation of the "Temporary Currency Law" which came into effect on June 1, 1938. It now became possible to change the material and purity of money without a resolution from the Imperial Diet. An aluminium bronze alloy consisting of 95% copper and 5% aluminium replaced the nickel coins as the latter was needed for munitions. Although nickel coins were produced dated 1938 (year 13), these were not distributed by the Bank of Japan. Almost the entire ten million mintage was re-melted to be used for the war effort per the newly established law. The weight and size of five sen coins did not change when the alloy was switched. Changes made included a new design again solicited from the general public, and a smaller central hole. The design chosen features on the obverse a chrysanthemum seal up on top with the paulownia below, while the reverse has cherry blossom halves flanking both sides. These coins were only produced for two years before an increased wartime demand for copper caused an alloy change. Five sen coins were switched to a pure aluminum alloy on July 19, 1940 (year 15) by Royal Decree No. 476. The size of the coins remained the same while the light aluminum alloy cut the weight of the coins by more than half from 2.80 to 1.20 grams. These coins feature a chrysanthemum seal on the obverse, and the mythical kite bird on the reverse (revised design from before).

As the war situation grew worse the demand for aluminum rose as the metal was needed for aircraft. The weight of five sen coins was lowered from 1.2 to 1 gram on August 27, 1941 by Royal Decree No. 826. Five sen coins by this time were valued at an American penny before the United States imposed an embargo. The Pacific War began a little more than three months later which caused supplies to travel long distances. More aluminum was taken out of five sen coins on February 5, 1943 by Royal Decree No. 60. This action lowered the weight of the coin further from 1 to 0.80 grams as the metal became difficult to obtain. The production of aluminum five sen coins stopped at the end of 1943 (year 18) as the shortage of supplies became extremely severe. Another alloy was sought for coinage, and tin was chosen as the material was relatively easy to obtain from occupied territories in Southeast Asia. Five sen coins using this alloy were enacted on March 8, 1944 by Royal Decree No. 388. The decision was not made lightly as Tin was a strategic material which is unsuitable for monetary purposes as the metal is soft. Five sen coins were reduced in size from 19 to 17mm, the weight was increased from 0.80 to 1.95 grams, and a central 4mm hole was added. The design for these coins simply feature a chrysanthemum seal and paulownia on the obverse, and inscriptions on the back. Production started for a brief time before being discontinued due to allied air superiority and control over the seas. Five sen notes were ultimately issued to bridge the gap as materials could no longer be secured for coins. Unissued porcelain five sen pieces were also made, but were mostly destroyed when World War II ended.

Five sen coins were brought back into production by the Japan Mint in September 1945. The initial plan was to use the design featured on the previous five sen aluminum coins. These coins were never released, and all of them were melted as permission was not granted by the Supreme Commander for the Allied Powers. Criticism fell upon the prewar design, and how the country's name read "大日本" (Dai Nippon, Japanese Empire) on the coins. The solution was to redesign the coin entirely and replace the name with "日本政府" (Nippon-koku, Government of Japan). Tin was chosen again for an alloy as aluminum was below the coin's face value. These final five sen coins are the same 17mm size as their predecessors, but weigh an even 2 grams (up from 1.95). The design features a chrysanthemum seal with a dove (symbol of peace) on the obverse, while the reverse has a large Latin numeral "5". Issuance came on January 26, 1946 by royal order after the coins were approved. These coins continued to be produced until supplies ran out sometime in 1946 (year 21). Five sen coins were eventually demonetized at the end of 1953 when the Japanese government passed a law abolishing subsidiary coinage in favor of the yen. Currencies of less than one yen were rarely used by this time due to excessive post-war inflation.

== Composition ==
Years	Material
1870–1880	80% silver, 20% copper
1889–1932	75% copper, 25% nickel
1933–1938	100% nickel
1938–1940	95% copper, 5% aluminium
1940–1943	100% aluminium
1944	93% tin, 7% zinc
1945–1946	93% tin, 7% zinc

== Circulation figures ==
=== Meiji ===
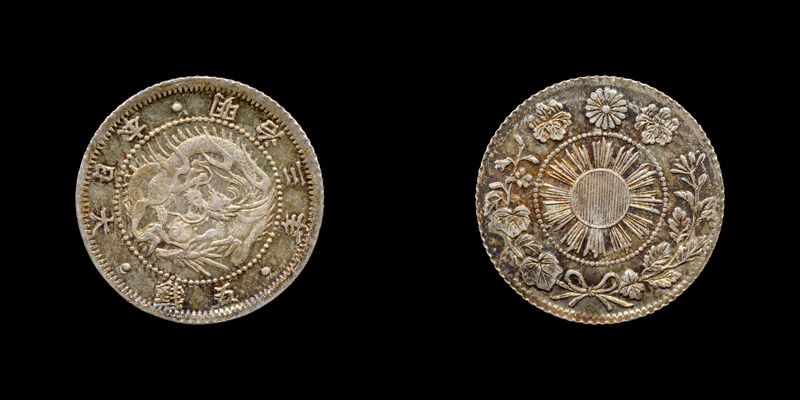
5 sen coin from 1870 (year 3) Design 1 - (1870–1871)

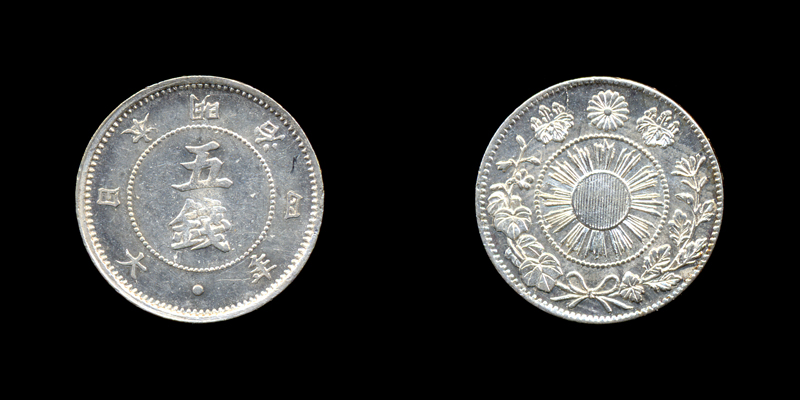
5 sen coin from 1871 (year 4) Design 2 - (1871)

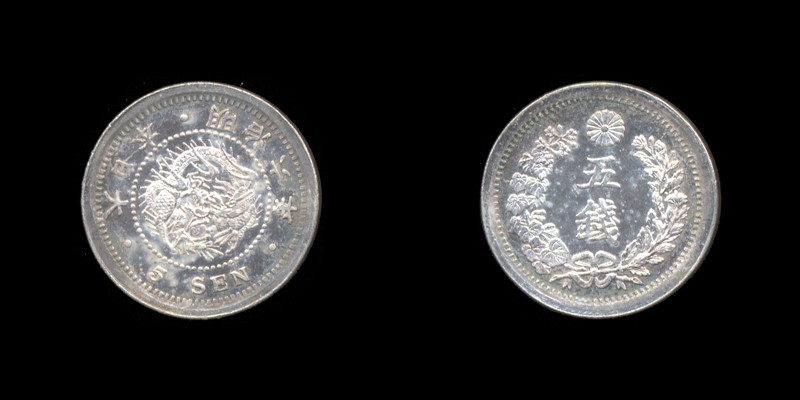
5 sen coin from 1873 (year 6) Design 3 - (1873–1880), (1892) (Note: 1892 dated silver coins with the 3rd dragon design were never intended for circulation as they were made for the World's Columbian Exposition as exhibits.)

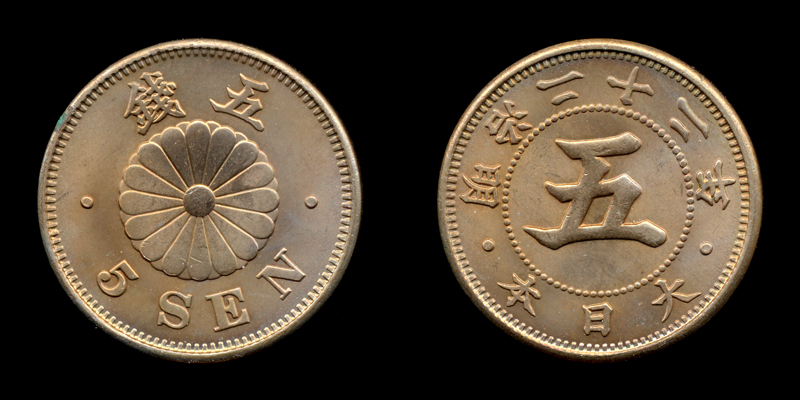
5 sen coin from 1889 (year 22) Design 4 - (1889–1897)

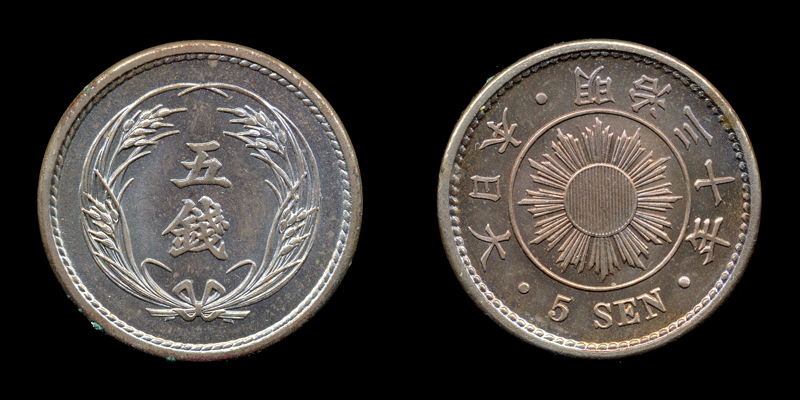
5 sen coin from 1897 (year 30) Design 5 - (1897–1906)

The following are circulation figures for five sen coins that were minted between the 3rd and 39th years of Emperor Meiji's reign. The dates all begin with the kanji characters 明治 (Meiji), followed by the year of his reign the coin was minted. Each coin is read clockwise from right to left, so in the example used below "四十二" would read as "year 24" or 1891.

- "Year" ← "Number representing year of reign" ← "Emperor's name" (Ex: 年 ← 四十二 ← 治明)

Year of reign	Japanese date	Gregorian date	Mintage
3rd	三	1870 (Note: Two varieties were made in 1870 in regards to the depth of the dragon's scales. The mintage figure shown is for the "shallow scales" variety, it is unknown how many were made for the "deep scales" coin.)	1,501,473
4th	四	1871 (First design)	1,501,473
4th	四	1871 (Second design)	1,665,613
6th	六	1873 (Note: The mintage total includes all types for this year.)	5,593,172
7th	七	1874	7,806,493
8th	八	1875	6,396,784
9th	九	1876	5,546,424
10th	十	1877	22,024,167
13th	三十	1880	79 (Note: Not intended for circulation.)
22nd	二十二	1889	28,841,944
23rd	三十二	1890	39,258,103
24th	四十二	1891	15,924,782
25th	五十二	1892 (Silver)	Not circulated
25th	五十二	1892 (Copper-Nickel)	9,510,289
26th	六十二	1893	8,531,858
27th	七十二	1894	14,680,000
28th	八十二	1895	1,030,000
29th	九十二	1896	5,119,988
30th	十三	1897 (Fourth design)	7,857,669
30th	十三	1897 (Fifth design)	4,167,020
31st	一十三	1898	18,197,271
32nd	二十三	1899	10,658,052
33rd	三十三	1900	2,426,632
34th	四十三	1901	7,124,824
35th	五十三	1902	24,478,544
36th	六十三	1903	372,000
37th	七十三	1904	1,628,000
38th	八十三	1905	6,000,000
39th	九十三	1906	Not circulated

=== Taishō ===
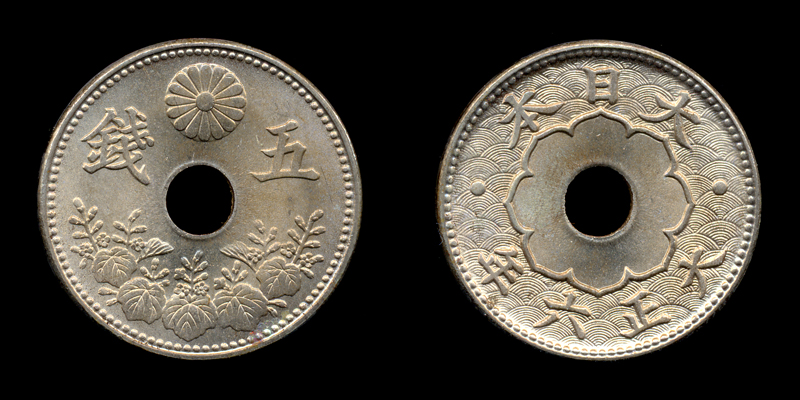
5 sen coin from 1917 (year 6)

The following are circulation figures for five sen coins that were minted between the 6th and 12th year of Emperor Taishō's reign. The dates all begin with the kanji characters 大正 (Taishō), followed by the year of his reign the coin was minted. Each coin is read clockwise from right to left, so in the example used below "二十" would read as "year 12" or 1923.

- "Year" ← "Number representing year of reign" ← "Emperor's name" (Ex: 年 ← 二十 ← 正大)

Year of reign	Japanese date	Gregorian date	Mintage
6th	六	1917	6,781,830
7th	七	1918	9,131,201
8th	八	1919	44,980,633
9th	九	1920	21,906,326
9th	九	1920 (Reduced size)	100,455,537
10th	十	1921	133,020,000
11th	一十	1922	163,980,000
12th	二十	1923	80,000,000

=== Shōwa ===
The following are circulation figures for five sen coins that were minted between the 7th and 21st years of Emperor Shōwa's reign. The dates all begin with the Japanese kanji characters 昭和 (Shōwa), followed by the year of his reign the coin was minted. Each coin is read clockwise from right to left, so in the example used below "二十" would read as "year 12" or 1937. Some of the mintages included cover more than one coin variety for a given year. Coin patterns that include examples struck on porcelain are not included here as they were never issued for circulation.

- "Year" ← "Number representing year of reign" ← "Emperors name" (Ex: 年 ← 二十 ← 和昭)

Year of reign	Japanese date	Gregorian date	Mintage
7th	七	1932 (Copper-nickel)	8,000,394
8th	八	1933 (Nickel)	16,150,808
9th	九	1934	33,851,607
10th	十	1935	13,680,677
11th	一十	1936	36,321,796
12th	二十	1937	44,402,201
13th	三十	1938 TY1 (Nickel)	10,000,000 (Note: Almost the entire mintage of 1938 nickel alloy coins were melted.)
13th	三十	1938 TY2 (Bronze)	90,001,977
14th	四十	1939	97,903,873
15th	五十	1940 TY1 (Bronze)	34,501,216
15th	五十	1940 TY2 (Aluminium)	167,638,000
16th	六十	1941	242,361,000
16th	六十	1941 (Reduced Weight)	478,023,877
17th	七十	1942	478,023,877
18th	八十	1943	276,493,742
19th	九十	1944 (Tin)	70,000,000
20th	十二	1945	180,000,000
21st	一十二	1946	180,000,000

== Shōwa era designs ==
Six different designs were used during the Shōwa era for the 5 sen coin, not including pattern coins which were never intended for circulation. As the weight and sizes were changed frequently after 1940, these designs have been listed separate with their respective information.

Image	Minted	Diameter	Mass	Comments
	1932 (Year 7)	19.1mm	2.63 g	This is a one year type design similar to Taishō era coins. (Small sized Taishō coin pictured)
	1933-1937 (Year 8-12)	19.0mm	2.80 g	Only four 1938 dated nickel coins are known to exist.
	1938-1940 (Year 13-15)	19.0mm	2.80 g	The alloy was changed in 1938 to Aluminium bronze.
	1940-1941 (Year 15-16)	19.0mm	1.20 g	The alloy was changed in 1940 to Aluminium.
	1941-1942 (Year 16-17)	19.0mm	1.00 g	Reduced weight, both years have a combined mintage total.
	1943 (Year 18)	19.0mm	0.80 g	Reduced weight.
	1944 (Year 19)	17.0mm	1.95 g	Reduced size, alloy changed to Tin/Zinc.
	1945-1946 (Year 20-21)	17.0mm	2.00 g	Final issue of the series.

== Collecting ==
The value of any given coin is determined by survivability rate and condition as collectors in general prefer uncleaned appealing coins. For this denomination there are many major varieties and design changes which occurred during three different imperial eras. The first coins struck in 1870 are grouped into two different types due to the details not striking up properly. Early strikes show shallow/unclear details in the scales on the dragon, while later strikes show deep/clear scales. The next design (dated 1871) has a similar issue as the varieties are also broken down into early and late strikes. Early strikes feature 53 rays in the sunburst on the reverse which is surrounded by 65 beads. Late strikes on the other hand have 66 rays and 79 beads with an altered foliage design in the wreath. These first two designs are opposing in terms of higher value, as late strike deep/clear scales, and early strike 53 rays/65 beads are worth the most. Both of these designs are considered to be scare overall as their low mintage totals left a small number of surviving coins. The next grouping of coins are those with the third design minted between 1873 and 1877. Every year with the exception of 1874 is broken up into major varieties, those in 1876 have obverse/reverse combinations:

Year of reign	Japanese date	Gregorian date	Rarity	Description
6th	六	1873	More common	Type 1: Character 明 in Meiji's name "separated".
6th	六	1873	Scarce	Type 2: Character 明 in Meiji's name "joined/connected" by an extra stroke.
8th	八	1875	More common	Type 3: Character sen (銭) with a "pointed" stroke.
8th	八	1875	Scarce	Type 4: Character sen (銭) with a "blunt" stroke.
9th	九	1876	More common	Character 明 in Meiji's name "separated"/sen (銭) with a "pointed" stroke.
9th	九	1876	Scarce	Character 明 in Meiji's name "separated"/sen (銭) with a "blunt" stroke.
9th	九	1876	More common	Character 明 in Meiji's name "joined/connected"/sen (銭) with a "pointed" stroke.
9th	九	1876	Rarest (Y9) (Note: Rarest of the 1876 variety grouping.)	Character 明 in Meiji's name "joined/connected"/sen (銭) with a "blunt" stroke.
10th	十	1877	More common	Type 1: Character 明 in Meiji's name "separated".
10th	十	1877	Scarce	Type 2: Character 明 in Meiji's name "separated" with horizontal stroke missing.

The last two silver five sen coins dated 1880 (year 13), and 1892 (year 25) were never intended for circulation. 1880 (year 13) dated coins have an estimated survival of 10 to 12 pieces out of the 79 originally minted. An example in VF20 condition sold for $22,000 (USD) in 2011. Coins dated 1880 are described as not "feasibly collectable" given their extreme rarity. Those struck in 1892 for the World's Columbian Exposition are possibly confined to a single surviving example.

The next design was issued from 1889 to 1897 and is considered to be pretty common with the exception of the lower mintage dates. Five sen coins dated 1895 (year 28) are seen as a key date, while those from 1896 and 1897 (year 29 and 30) are semi keys. Rice wreath coins made from 1897 to 1906 were the final design issued during the Meiji era. Coins with this design are valued on average at 1000 yen or more due to low mintage amounts. Five sen coins dated 1903 (year 36) are considered to be rare with a recorded mintage of 372,000 made. Prices for this particular date start in the tens of thousands of yen for coins in average condition. When Emperor Meiji died in 1912, his son was enthroned as Emperor Taishō. Only one coin design was produced during this era which is broken up into the two size groups. Large type five sen coins issued from 1917 to 1920 are generally more scarce than their later smaller counterparts. Coin exchanges at banks in 1920 (large for small) led to a smaller amount of surviving large size coins. Key dates in the large coin type series are those dated 1917 and 1918 (Taishō year 6 and 7). Small sized five sen coins made between 1920 and 1923 were produced in larger amounts making them more commonly found.

The small sized copper-nickel holed design carried over to Emperor Shōwa in 1932 (Shōwa year 7) with 8 million coins produced. These are only valued a bit more than previous era coins due to a large amount of surviving examples. Coins made during the Shōwa era after 1932 are inexpensive due to the large amount of surviving examples. Pure nickel coins struck from 1933 to 1937 are rarely seen in worn condition due to the short distribution period and quality of the metal. Many coins were kept from the next design (1938 to 1940) as their distribution period only lasted for three years. Aluminium and Tin based coins produced from 1940 to 1946 were largely kept by the public as they later became useless due to severe inflation.
