= 5 sen note =

Japanese sen note

(Japan)
- Value: 1/20 Japanese yen
- Years of printing: 1944–1948

Obverse
- Design: Kusunoki Masashige; Ume (Japanese Plum) (A)

Reverse
- Design: Paulownia "5 Sen" in Latin (A)

The 5 sen note (五銭紙幣) was a denomination of Japanese yen that was issued nonconsecutively from 1944 to 1948 in paper form. Five sen notes were worth one-twentieth of a yen, making them the lowest subsidiary yen banknote ever made. These notes were broken up into two types, which were issued before and after World War II. Those issued before the war filled a void left when 5 sen coin production became difficult. The second and final issue came after the war when the Japanese government tried unsuccessfully to curb inflation. Neither of these notes are currently legal tender as the "sen" was abolished in 1953 when the yen system was modified to exclude the old fractional currency. These banknotes are now easily collectable and affordable as they were issued in large amounts.

== History ==
Five sen notes were first issued towards the end of World War II as supplies had run out to produce more five sen coins. When the Second Sino-Japanese War broke out in 1937, five sen coins were made from a pure nickel alloy. The alloy for the coins was soon changed to Aluminium bronze, then to Aluminium, and eventually to tin as precious metals were needed for military supplies. Five sen coins made out of tin were first produced in March 1944, but there was only a limited supply of tin available to strike the coins. As the Second Sino-Japanese War became part of World War II, Japan was losing territory to the allied forces. Although the Japanese could obtain the alloy from their still occupied Southwest Asian (Note: This is assuming travel from mainland Japan.) colonies, allied air superiority and control over the seas made the transport of tin difficult. Five sen notes were thus first issued on November 1, 1944 with a design featuring Kusunoki Masashige on the front. The depiction of this Kamakura period samurai led to the first series being known as "Masashige notes". The design on the back has the Government Seal of Japan, also known as the "Paulownia Seals", after the Paulownia flower. These notes were issued in large amounts due to rising inflation.

The last "5 sen" notes were issued on May 25, 1948 as part of the "A series". In order to curb post-war inflation the Bank of Japan invalidated all banknotes issued before the war in a process called "new yen switching" (新円切替). As the name implies, old notes worth a yen or more were removed from circulation and were replaced by new ones. Five sen notes from this time are notable for being the smallest sized banknotes ever issued by the Japanese government at a mere 48 mm × 94 mm. The front design features the Ume ("Japanese plum") flower, while the reverse shows the value "5 Sen" in Latin script. Due to post-war turmoil, notes from the "A series" with the exception of the 100 yen note were all poorly made. To make matters worse five sen notes were printed by two different private sector companies which led to "big differences" and counterfeiting. These notes eventually lost their meaning as the new yen switching initiative failed to ease the worsening inflation issue. Both of these issues were eventually demonetized at the end of 1953 when the Japanese government passed a law abolishing subsidiary notes in favor of the yen. Currencies of less than one yen were rarely used by this time due to excessive post-war inflation.

Five sen notes from both series are now bought and sold as collectibles depending on condition. These notes were produced in large amounts, making the slight scarcity of the latter post-war notes negligible. Both series are inexpensive as reflected by a large amount of surviving examples. Exceptions are made for notes made in error, such as those with a cutting misalignment, those with missing design features, and those with unusual ink leakage which carry a much higher value. Holed SPECIMEN (見本) notes were also made for the "first issue" series and carry an additional premium.

== Designs ==
Series	Obverse	Reverse
1944 (昭和19) (Note: Dates are included here to differentiate the two series as no dates appear on the notes themselves.) ("Masashige") ("First issue series")		
1948 (昭和23) ("A series")		

== See also ==
- Banknotes of the Japanese yen
- Bank of Japan
- Japanese military currency (1894–1918)
- Taiwanese stamp currency
