= 1 sen coin =

Former unit of Japanese currency

One Sen
- Japan
- Value: 1/100 Japanese Yen
- Mass: (1873–1915) 7.13 g, (1916–1945) various g
- Diameter: (1873–1915) 27.9 mm, (1916–1945) various mm
- Shape: circular
- Composition: Various compositions
- Years of minting: 1873–1945

Obverse
- Design: Varies, depending on year.

Reverse
- Design: Varies, depending on year.

The one sen coin (一銭) was a Japanese coin worth one-hundredth of a Japanese yen, as 100 sen equalled 1 yen. One sen coins were first struck for circulation during the 6th year of Meiji's reign (1873) using a dragon design. The denomination had been adopted in 1871 but coinage at the time could not be carried out. Aside from an alloy change and a new rice stalk wreath design, one sen coins remained the same weight and size for the remainder of the era. The situation changed when World War I broke out under Emperor Taishō as rising metal costs led to a size and weight reduction. These smaller coins were first produced in 1916 with a paulownia design which was seen as liberal at the time. Emperor Shōwa took the throne in 1926, and Japan was pushed into a militaristic regime by the early 1930s causing metals to be set aside for wartime conditions. These effects would later impact one sen coins through numerous alloy, size, and design changes.

Bronze was the first alloy to be used for coinage which was replaced by brass, then aluminium in the span of a single year (1938). One sen coins were made lighter and were reduced in size as World War II raged on causing a demand for material to make military supplies. The last coins were produced from 1944 to 1945 using a tin and zinc based alloy as the situation further deteriorated. One sen coins were discontinued after the war, and were demonetized at the end of 1953 along with other subsidiary coinage. Collectors now trade these coins on the market where their value depends on survivability rate and condition.

== History ==
=== Meiji and Taishō (1873–1924) ===
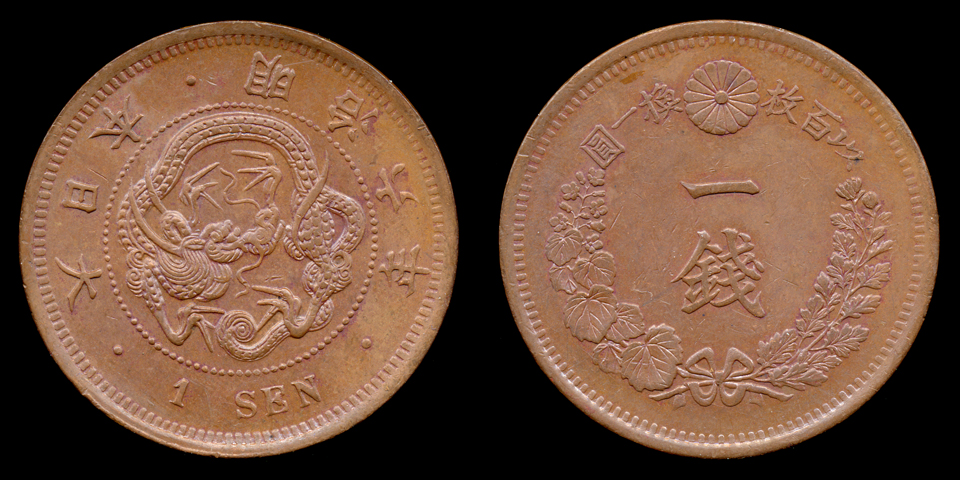
Production of the one sen coin began in 1873 during Meiji's 6th year of reign

One sen coins along with twelve other denominations were adopted by the Meiji government in an act signed on June 27, 1871. This new coinage gave Japan a western style decimal system based on units of yen, which were broken down into subsidiary currency of sen, and rin. The first coins minted were trial strikes or pattern coins, which are dated 1869 (year 2 of Meiji) and 1870 (year 3). No coins were struck for circulation right away as the technology to mass-produce the coins was poor at the time. Silver and gold coins were thus given priority as they were produced and distributed to the market before copper coinage could be carried out. One sen coins were eventually introduced on August 29, 1873, via government notification. Each coin was authorized to be struck in an alloy of copper, weighs 110 grains (7.13g), and has a 1.10 inch diameter (27.9mm). Obverse features on the first one sen design include a dragon with the date of reign, and "1 sen" written in English. Reverse features include the value "1 sen" (written in Kanji) centered inside a wreath design. The Chrysanthemum seal is located at the top of the coin flanked by the words "100 for one yen" in Kanji. These coins were legal tender only up to the amount of 1 yen which was fixed by government regulations.

Production continued for a few years before it was stopped as no coins are dated from year 11 or 12 (1878 and 1879). It is theorized that the aftermath of the Satsuma Rebellion could have left an impact. When production resumed in 1880 (year 13), the scales on the obverse dragon design were changed from a square to a V-shaped pattern. This slightly modified first one sen design continued to be minted until 1888 (year 21), when coinage was stopped due to mass production and a slight oversupply. As with several other denominations it's possible that non circulating one sen dragon coins were made again in 1892 (year 25) for display at the World's Columbian Exposition. (Note: Several unique coins dated 1892 are known to have been produced to display at the World's Columbian Exposition. While there are no known existing examples of one sen coins dated 1892 (year 25), they are mentioned by Krause Publications.) The Japanese government officially switched to the gold standard on October 1, 1897, and new coinage laws were adopted. Changes for the one sen coin included a reduction of copper content by 3%, while the weight and size of the coins were left the same as before. Both sides of the coin received a brand new design as some of the older elements were no longer viewed positively. The dragon on the obverse side in particular was removed due to the First Sino-Japanese War which lasted from 1894 to 1895. (Note: It was a practice of the Qing dynasty to honor the dragon.) A rice stalk wreath was chosen to replace the dragon, while the reverse side of the coin received a sunburst design.

One sen coins continued to be struck for circulation in the Meiji era until 1902 (year 35). While coins dated 1906 and 1909 (year 39 and 42) were struck, none were released for circulation. Although production resumed under Emperor Taishō in 1913, World War I broke out in the following year. This event brought Japan a booming economy which required an increase of small denomination coins. At the same time rising metal costs to produce one sen coins became an issue, and their large size had made them difficult to distribute. Pattern coins were made in 1915 and again in 1916 to test out a smaller design which debuted in the latter year. This new design features the paulownia coat of arms, is 23.03 mm in diameter, and weighs 3.75g. The paulownia design was controversial at the time and seen as a liberal democratic trend which was criticized by those in the right wing. One sen coins with this design continued to be produced until 1924 (year 13 of Taishō) without any additional changes.

=== Shōwa (1927–1953) ===
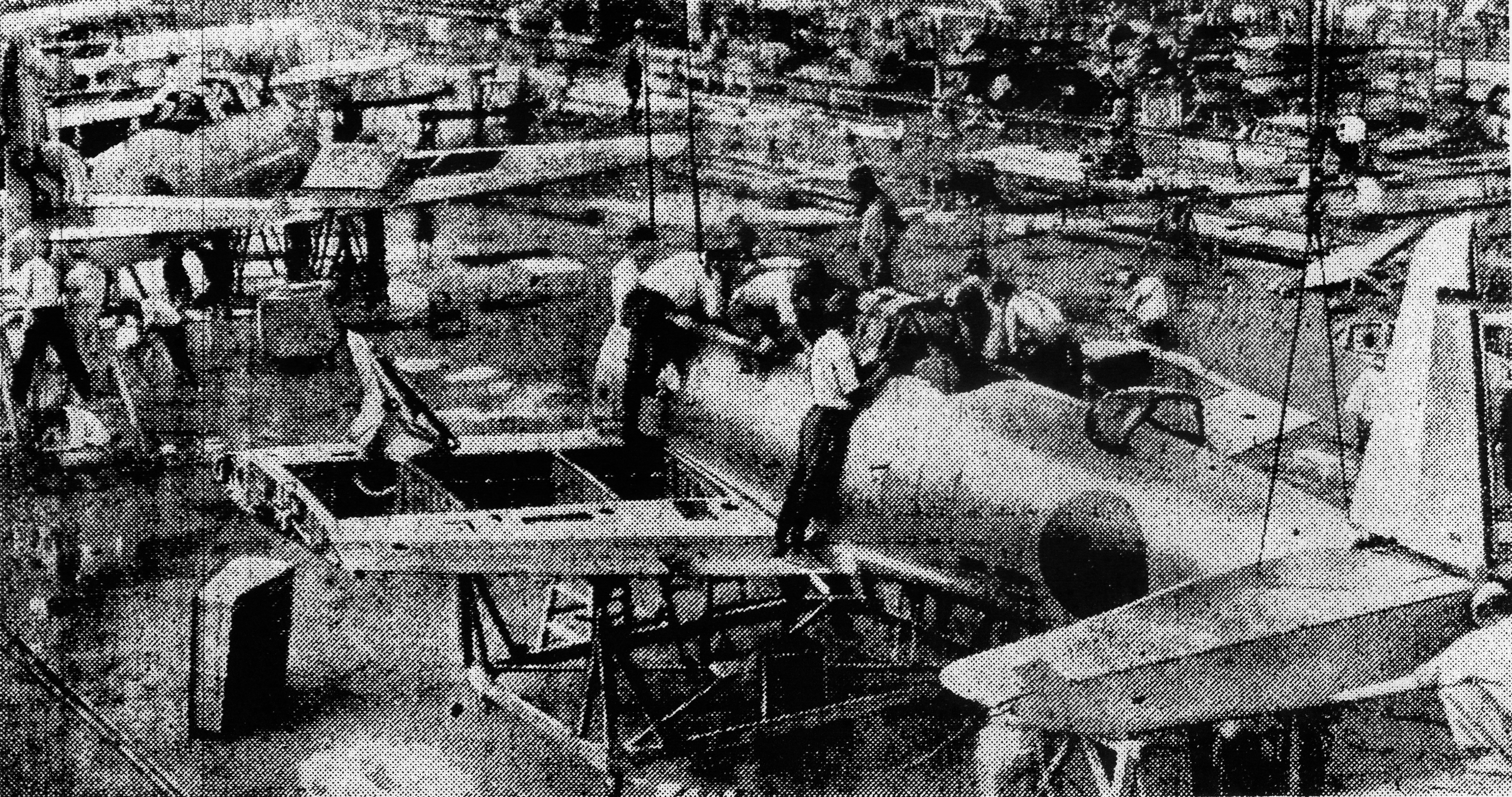
Materials to make coins such as aluminum were eventually needed for aircraft (c.1944).

One sen coins were minted again during Emperor Shōwa's 2nd year of reign (1927) using the Taishō era paulownia design. Meanwhile, events around the world including the Great Depression were leading up to another world war. Japan was pushed into a militaristic regime by 1933, and started stockpiling nickel as war materials. The Second Sino-Japanese War broke out in 1937 and a National Mobilization Law was declared in the following year. This action suspended the coinage act of 1897 and allowed the Japanese government to issue temporary subsidiary coins without obtaining approval from the Imperial Diet. New brass coins featuring a crow design on the obverse replaced the old copper paulownia coins on June 1, 1938. Brass was chosen as the previous composition contained tin which was a military-important metal not produced in Japan. The "crow" design with waves on the obverse, and eight ridge mirrors on the reverse was made by combining submissions from a public offering. On November 29, 1938, the act was revised and one sen coins were struck in aluminum as copper was needed for munitions. The diameter of the one sen coin was reduced from 23 down to 17.6mm, while the weight dropped from 3.75 to 0.90 grams. Although the coins were now smaller and lighter, the crow and waves design did not change.

By using aluminum, one sen coins were produced in large amounts as the alloy is naturally soft, did not require annealing, and extended the life of the dies. The design of the one sen coin changed again in 1941, featuring Mount Fuji on the reverse representing Hakkō ichiu. The obverse side shows the character "ichi" or "one" representing the value of the coin. This feature was allegedly handwritten by Isao Kawada, who was the minister of finance at the time. The diameter of the coin was also reduced from 17.6 to 16mm while the weight dropped from 0.90 to 0.65 grams. In April 1943 the Japanese government announced plans to use tin in coinage as aluminum was needed for more aircraft. This shift did not happen right away as one sen coins had their aluminum content dropped from 0.65 to 0.55g that year. However, as World War II dragged on the amount of available aluminum was eventually depleted.

Tin and zinc replaced aluminum for one sen coins when they were issued in March 1944. The final design used for these coins features a chrysanthemum crest with value on the obverse, and inscriptions on the reverse. Although tin was not an ideal choice for money as the metal is heat-sensitive and soft, the Japanese government had no alternatives. Supplies of tin were available at the time from occupied Southeast Asia where the metal was abundantly produced. This remedy was temporary as one sen coins were forcefully discontinued in 1945 due to a depleted tin supply from naval blockades. A last ditch attempt was made by making one sen coins out of porcelain in the final months of the war. These were never officially issued and were destroyed (Note: One sen coins struck in porcelain as pattern coins were spared.) afterwards. One sen coins were officially demonetized at the end of 1953 when the Japanese government passed a law abolishing subsidiary coinage in favor of the yen. By this time, excessive post-war inflation had made them redundant as they were rarely seen in circulation.

== Composition ==
Years	Material
1873–1888	98% Copper, 2% Tin and Zinc
1898–1938	95% Copper, 4% Tin, 1% Aluminium
1938	90% Copper, 10% Zinc
1938–1943	100% Aluminium
1944–1945	50% Tin, 50% Zinc

== Circulation figures ==
=== Meiji ===
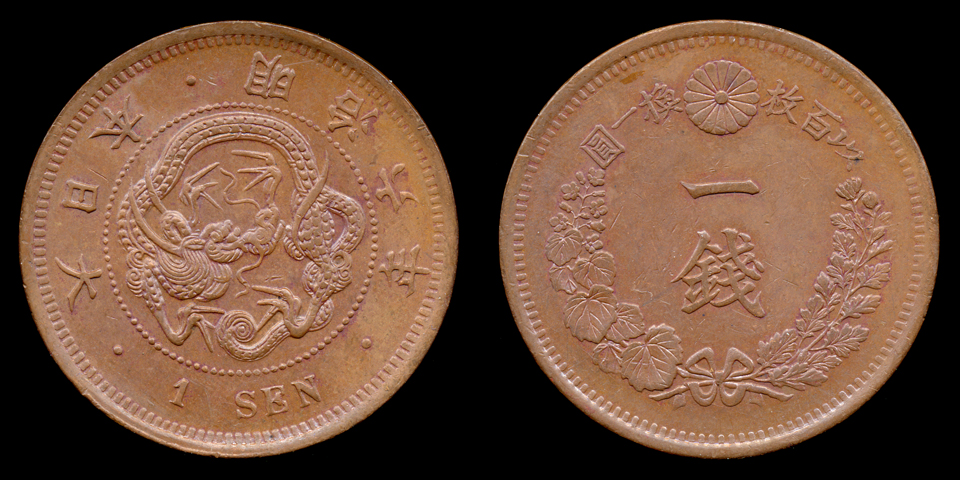
One sen coin from 1873 (year 6) Design 1 - (1873–1892)

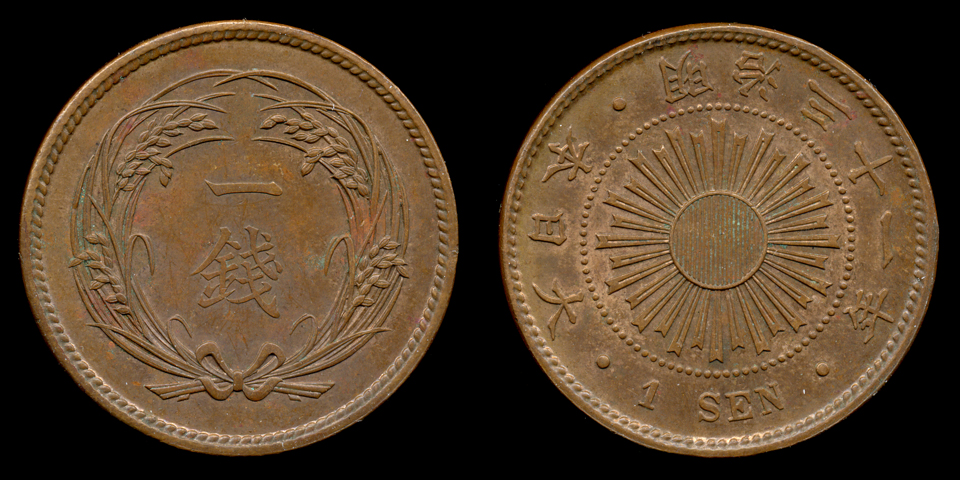
One sen coin from 1898 (year 31) Design 2 - (1898–1909)

The following are circulation figures for one sen coins that were minted between the 6th, and 42nd year of Meiji's reign. The dates all begin with the Japanese symbol 明治 (Meiji), followed by the year of his reign the coin was minted. Each coin is read clockwise from right to left, so in the example used below "一十二" would read as "year 21" or 1888. Some of the mintages included cover more than one variety of a given coin.

- "Year" ← "Number representing year of reign" ← "Emperors name" (Ex: 年 ← 一十二 ← 治明 ← Top of coin facing self)

Year of reign	Japanese date	Gregorian date	Mintage
6th	六	1873	1,301,486
7th	七	1874	25,564,953
8th	八	1875	32,832,038
9th	九	1876	38,048,906
10th	十	1877	98,041,824
13th	三十	1880	33,947,810
14th	四十 (Note: The mintage given on the right includes both "Large 4" (四) and normal varieties)	1881	16,123,612
15th	五十	1882	19,150,666
16th	六十	1883	47,613,017
17th	七十	1884	53,702,768
18th	八十	1885	46,846,352
19th	九十	1886	26,886,198
20th	十二	1887	22,249,580
21st	一十二	1888	25,864,939
25th	五十二	1892	Not circulated
31st	一十三	1898	3,649,448
32nd	二十三	1899	9,764,028
33rd	三十三	1900	3,086,524
34th	四十三	1901	5,555,155
35th	五十三	1902	4,444,845
39th	九十三	1906	Not circulated
42nd	二十四	1909	Not circulated

=== Taishō ===
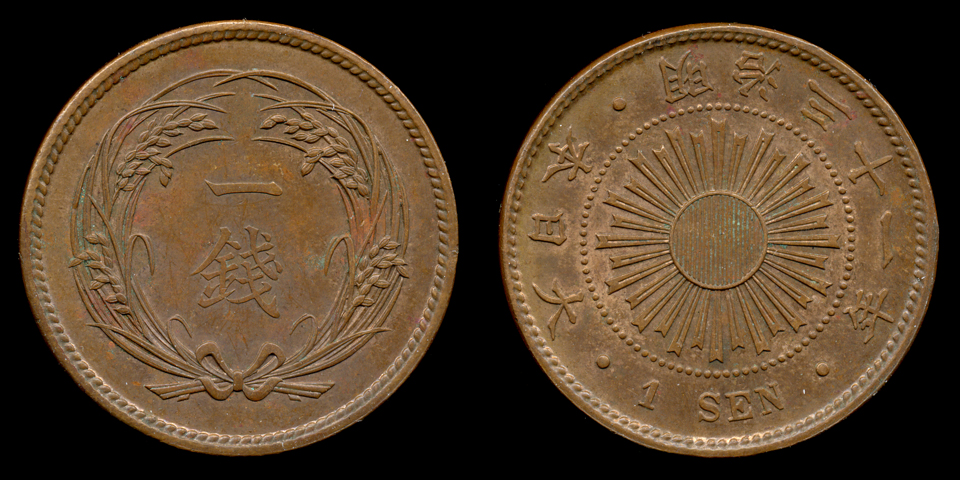
One sen coin (Note: These coins use the same design as those minted previously under Meiji, but have Taishō's name and year of reign on the reverse.) Design 1 - (1913–1915)

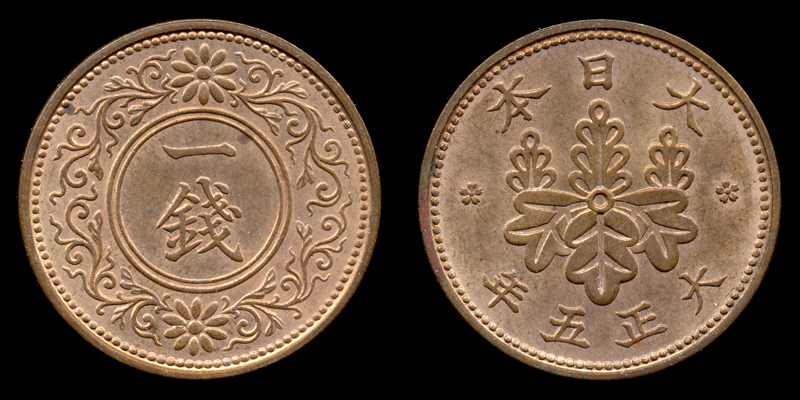
One sen coin from 1916 (year 5) Design 2 - (1916–1924)

The following are circulation figures for one sen coins that were minted between the 2nd and 13th year of Taishō's reign. The dates all begin with the Japanese symbol 大正 (Taishō), followed by the year of his reign the coin was minted. Each coin is read clockwise from right to left, so in the example used below "二十" would read as "year 12" or 1923.

- "Year" ← "Number representing year of reign" ← "Emperors name" (Ex: 年 ← 二十 ← 正大 ← Top of coin facing self)

Year of reign	Japanese date	Gregorian date	Mintage
2nd	二	1913	15,000,000
3rd	三	1914	10,000,000
4th	四	1915	13,000,000
5th	五	1916 (Reduced) (Note: The size and weight of the sen was reduced in 1916 to save production costs.)	19,193,946
6th	六	1917	27,183,078
7th	七	1918	121,794,756
8th	八	1919	209,959,359
9th	九	1920	118,829,256
10th	十	1921	252,440,000
11th	一十	1922	253,210,000
12th	二十	1923	155,500,000
13th	三十	1924	106,250,000

=== Shōwa ===
The following are circulation figures for one sen coins that were minted between the, and year of Emperor Shōwa's reign. The dates all begin with the Japanese symbol 昭和 (Shōwa), followed by the year of his reign the coin was minted. Each coin is read clockwise from right to left, so in the example used below "二十" would read as "year 12" or 1937. Coin patterns that include examples struck on porcelain are not included here as they were never issued for circulation.

- "Year" ← "Number representing year of reign" ← "Emperors name" (Ex: 年 ← 二十 ← 和昭 ← Top of coin facing self)

Year of reign	Japanese date	Gregorian date	Mintage
2nd	二	1927	26,500,000
4th	四	1929	3,000,000
5th	五	1930	5,000,000
6th	六	1931	25,001,222
7th	七	1932	35,066,715
8th	八	1933	38,936,907
9th	九	1934	100,004,950
10th	十	1935	200,009,912
11th	一十	1936	109,170,428
12th	二十	1937	133,196,568
13th	三十	1938 TY1 Bronze (Note: One sen coins minted in 1938 are split into three different composition types (see table above).)	87,649,338
13th	三十	1938 TY2 Brass	113,600,000
13th	三十	1938 TY3 Al	45,502,266
14th	四十	1939	444,602,146
15th	五十	1940	601,110,015
16th	六十	1941	1,016,620,734
17th	七十	1942	119,709,832
18th	八十	1943	1,163,949,434
18th	八十	1943 (Lighter)	627,160,000
19th	九十	1944	1,629,580,000
20th	十二	1945	1,629,580,000

== Shōwa era designs ==
Five different designs were used during the Shōwa era for the 1 sen coin, not including pattern coins which were never intended for circulation. As the weight and sizes were changed frequently after 1937, these designs have been listed separate with their respective information.

Image	Minted	Diameter	Mass
	1927–1938 (Note: This carried over the same design minted under Emperor Taishō since 1916.) (Year 2–13)	23.0mm	3.75g
	1938 (Note: These are "type 2" brass coins.) (Year 13)	23.0mm	3.75g
	1938–1940 (Year 13–15)	17.6mm	0.90g
	1941–1943 (Year 16–18)	16.0mm	0.65g
	1943 (Year 18)	16.0mm	0.55g
	1944–1945 (Year 19–20)	15.0mm	1.30g

== Collecting ==
The value of any given coin is determined by survivability rate and condition as collectors in general prefer uncleaned appealing coins. One sen coins with the dragon design (1873 to 1888) have two main key dates which are worth the most. The first key date are coins dated 1873 (year 3) given their low mintage, while the second and rarest key date of the series are coins from 1881 (year 14) with the "large 4" variety. The latter of the two features slightly different strokes inside the character "four" (四), which makes the inner right stroke look like an obtuse angle. Copper subsidiary coinage including half sen, sen, and two sen coins all initially use a dragon design. All of these except one sen coins have two varieties made during 1877 as the scales were changed from a square to a "V" shape pattern. One sen coins received the change in 1880, and there is little difference in value when it comes to the design of the dragon's scales. The next rice wreath design (1898 to 1915) spanned two imperial eras. In general, coins dated towards the end of the Meiji era (1898 to 1902) are worth slightly more than those made under Emperor Taishō. The most valuable of these coins are dated from 1900 and 1902 (year 33 and 35). Finally, one sen coins with the paulownia design (1916 to 1938) have a single key date with 1930 (year 5 of Shōwa). The one sen coin eventually received a crow design in 1938 and production increased until the series ended in 1945. Collecting these later dates remains affordable as there are plenty of surviving coins.

== See also ==
- Penny, similar denominations in other currencies
