= 10 yen coin =

Denomination of Japanese yen

Ten yen
- Japan
- Value: 10 Japanese yen
- Mass: 4.5 g
- Diameter: 23.5 mm
- Thickness: 1.5 mm
- Edge: Reeded (1951-1958); Smooth (1959-present)
- Composition: 95% Cu; 3-4% Zn; 1-2% Sn
- Years of minting: 1871–present
- Catalog number: -

Obverse
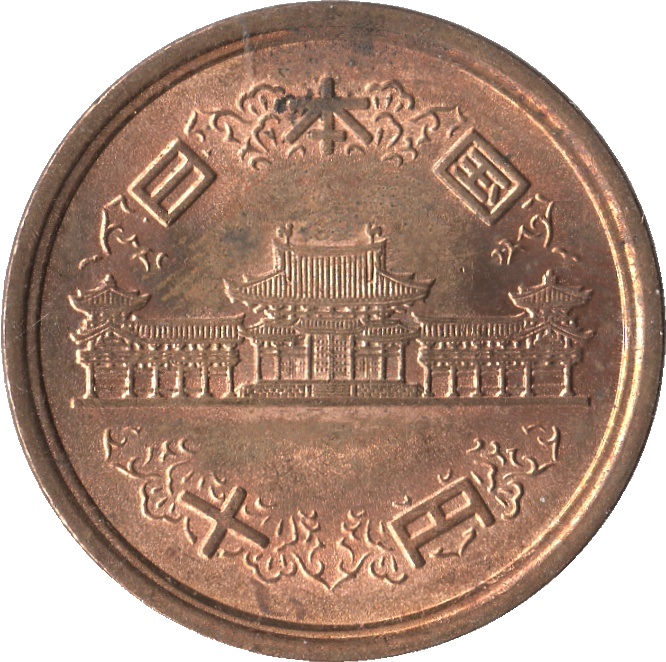
- Design: Phoenix Hall of Byōdō-in
- Design date: 1951

Reverse
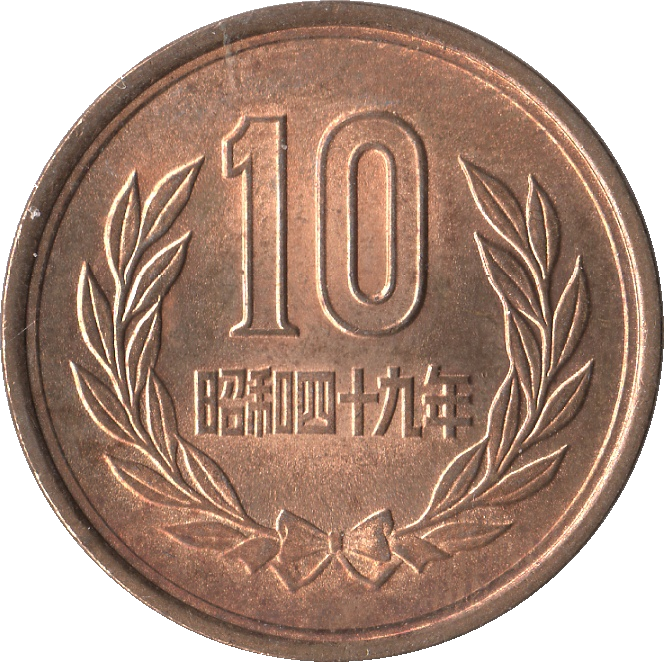
- Design: Bay laurel leaves
- Design date: 1951

The 10 yen coin (十円硬貨, Jū-en kōka) is one denomination of the Japanese yen.

The obverse of the coin depicts the Phoenix Hall of Byōdō-in, a Buddhist temple in Uji, Kyoto prefecture, with the kanji for "Japan" and "Ten Yen". The reverse shows the numerals "10" and the date of issue in kanji surrounded by bay laurel leaves.

== History ==
=== Gold ten yen (1871-1910) ===
Ten yen coins were first issued in 1871 from a newly established mint at Osaka. The origin of mintage is not clear as there are conflicting reports stating that ten yen coins were either minted in San Francisco, or in Japan the prior year. In either case the unit of yen was officially adopted by the Meiji government in an act signed on June 27, 1871. Under the new law each ten yen coin was to weigh 257.2 grains, and contain 90% gold with a foreign exchange rate close to a United States Eagle (US$10 coin). Gold bullion for coinage was delivered from private Japanese citizens, foreigners, and the Japanese government. No ten yen coins were minted between 1871 and 1876, during this time the Japanese government tried unsuccessfully to implement a gold standard with the amount of gold in circulation described as "very trifling". Gold bullion rose to a slight premium in 1874 which caused gold coin production as a whole to rapidly fall off. It was reported in the Quarterly Journal of Economics that by 1876 more gold coins were exported to foreign countries than for use domestically. Japan was later forced off of the gold standard in 1877 due to the cost of the Satsuma Rebellion. Twenty years would pass before the Japanese government went back on the gold standard. During this lapse non circulating ten yen gold coins were made in two non-consecutive years for two different reasons. The first occasion occurred in 1880 when ten yen gold proof coins were struck for exclusive use in presentation sets that were given away as gifts to foreign diplomats. The second and final instance involved the World's Columbian Exposition in 1892 where several newly minted coins were put on display.

When Japan went back on the gold standard in 1897, new ten yen coins were set by law to weigh 8.3g and have a diameter of 21.2mm. (Note: Ten yen gold coins initially weighed 16.6g with a width of 29.4mm.) These new lighter and smaller coins were given a new design which features a sunburst superimposed on the sacred mirror on the obverse, and the value within a wreath on the reverse. The adoption of the gold standard allowed Japanese ten yen gold certificates to be redeemed for gold. This convertible paper currency was used in immense numbers while coined yen was seldom used or seen. Gold ten yen coins of the second design (1897 to 1910) mostly remained in government vaults by the time mintage ceased for good in 1910. The coins that had been minted during those thirteen years continued to back up gold certificates until World War I due to inflation. The remaining gold coins in circulation were eventually withdrawn due to wartime conditions in the late 1930s. Those that remained in circulation were either hoarded or melted down by the public.

=== Modern ten yen (1950-) ===
The first ten yen coins made after World War II were authorized by law on March 2, 1950, by prime minister Shigeru Yoshida. These coins were to be made of German Silver, and act as "temporary subsidiary coins". A total of 432,970,000 ten yen coins minted in this new alloy were recorded as struck by the end of that year. By the end of 1951 almost 800 million of these coins had been minted and were waiting to be distributed. None of the German silver coins minted between 1950 and 1951 ever circulated as the coins were eventually melted. The decision to melt the coins came as the Korean War had driven nickel prices to about 4.1 million yen per ton. Those that escaped being melted and are now considered by collectors to be "scarce" Japanese pattern coins. Bronze ten yen coins were first minted in 1951, but were not released for general circulation until January 4, 1953. Ten yen coins minted between 1951 and 1958 have reeded edges and are nicknamed Giza 10 (ギザ10, Giza Ju), meaning “jagged 10 yen coin” in Japanese. The design which is used today features Phoenix Hall of Byōdō-in on the obverse, and Bay laurel leaves on the reverse. The design remains essentially the same other than the reeds being dropped in 1959 which gave the coins a smooth edge. Slight modifications were also made in the latter half of 1986 regarding the design of Byōdō-in. These coins are not culturally recommended to be offered at shrines, as another word for "10" is "toh" (十), and another word for "yen" is "en" (円). Combining these characters into "toh-en" can also read as "far destiny" (遠縁). Ten yen coins continue to be produced up to the present under the Reiwa era.

== Composition ==
Years	Material
1871–1910	90% gold, 10% copper
1951–present	95% copper, 3.5% zinc, 1.5% tin

== Circulation figures ==
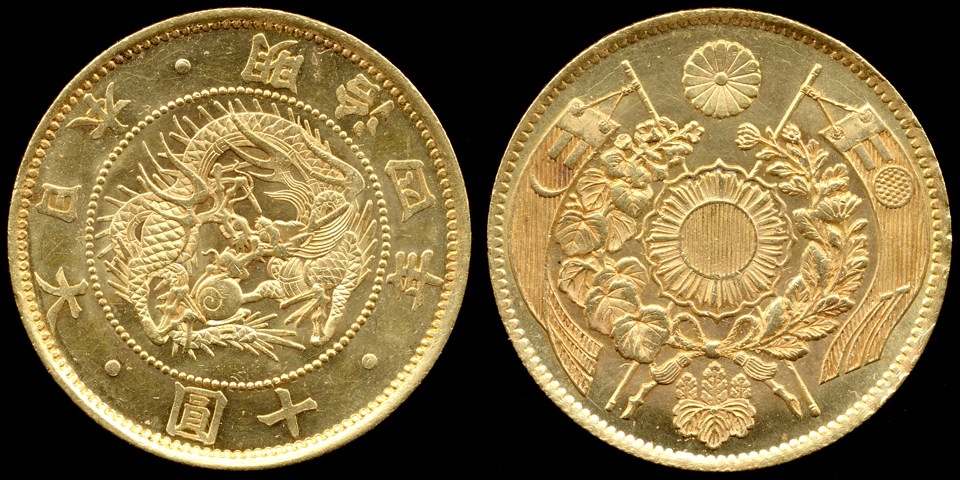
10 yen coin from 1871 (year 4) Design 1 - (1871–1880)

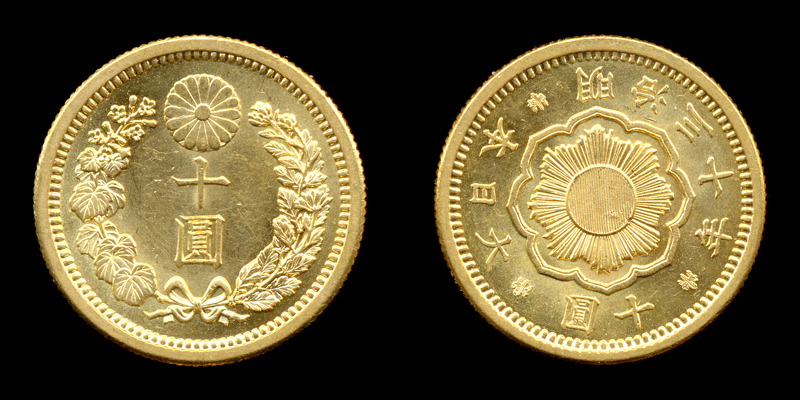
10 yen coin from 1897 (year 30) Design 2 - (1897–1910)

=== Meiji ===
The following are circulation figures for the coins that were minted between the 4th, and the 43rd year of Meiji's reign. Coins for this period all begin with the Japanese symbol 明治 (Meiji).

- Inscriptions on Japanese coins from this period are read clockwise from right to left:

"Year" ← "Number representing year of reign" ← "Emperor's name" (Ex: 年 ← 五十三 ← 治明)

Year of reign	Japanese date	Gregorian date	Mintage
4th	四	1871	1,867,032
9th	九	1876	1,925
10th	十	1877	36
13th	三十	1880	136
25th	五十二	1892	Not circulated (Note: 1892 dated coins were never intended for circulation as they were made for the World's Columbian Exposition as exhibits.)
30th	十三	1897	2,422,146
31st	一十三	1898	3,176,134
32nd	二十三	1899	1,743,006
33rd	三十三	1900	1,114,766
34th	四十三	1901	1,654,682
35th	五十三	1902	3,023,940
36th	六十三	1903	2,902,184
37th	七十三	1904	724,548
40th	十四	1907	157,684
41st	一十四	1908	1,160,674
42nd	二十四	1909	2,165,660
43rd	三十四	1910	8,982

=== Shōwa ===
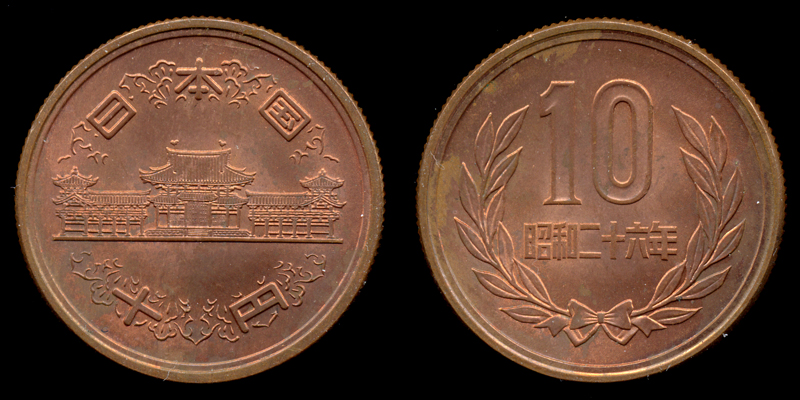
10 yen coin from 1951 (year 26) Design 1 - (1951–1958) Reeded

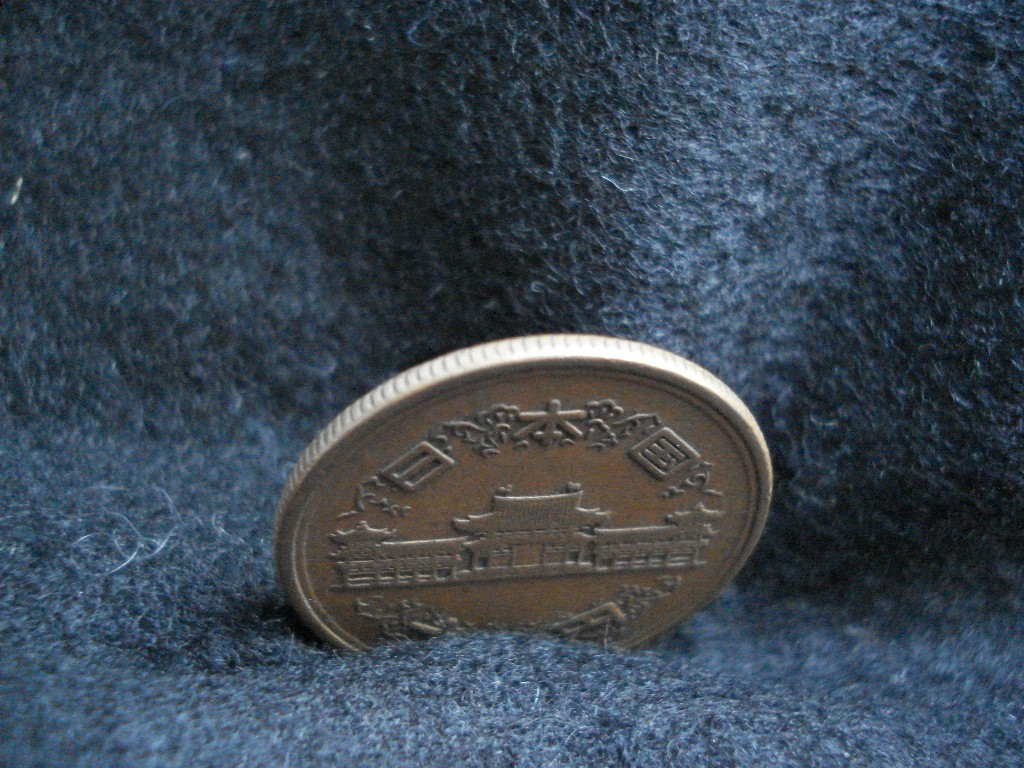
10 yen coin from 1952 (year 27) showing its reeded edge

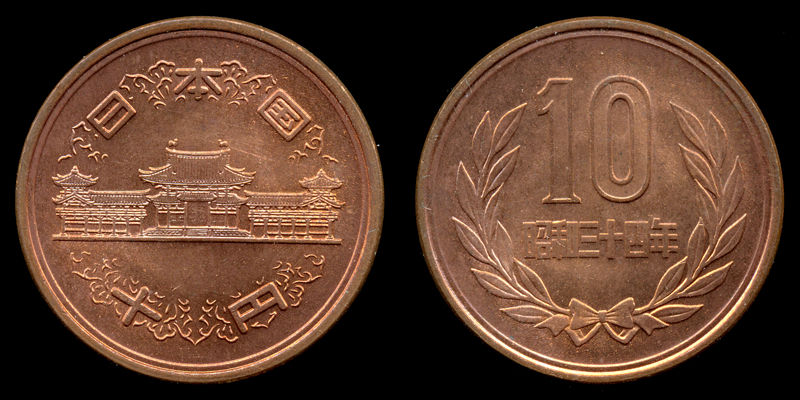
10 yen coin from 1959 (year 34) Design 2 - (1959–present) Smooth

The following are circulation dates which cover Emperor Hirohito's reign. The dates below correspond with the 26th to the 64th year (last) of his reign. All ten yen coins that were made before 1959 have reeded edges, this has since changed to the present day smooth edge. Coins for this period will all begin with the Japanese symbol 昭和 (Shōwa).

- Japanese coins are read with a left to right format:

"Emperors name" → "Number representing year of reign" → "Year" (Ex: 昭和 → 三十四 → 年).

Year of reign	Japanese date	Gregorian date	Mintage (Note: Mintages on the Japan Mint website are in thousands)
26th	二十六	1951	101,068,000
27th	二十七	1952	486,632,000
28th	二十八	1953	466,300,000
29th	二十九	1954	520,900,000
30th	三十	1955	123,100,000
32nd	三十二	1957	50,000,000
33rd	三十三	1958 (Reeded)	25,000,000
34th	三十四	1959 (Smooth)	62,400,000
35th	三十五	1960	225,900,000
36th	三十六	1961	229,900,000
37th	三十七	1962	284,200,000
38th	三十八	1963	411,300,000
39th	三十九	1964	479,200,000
40th	四十	1965	387,600,000
41st	四十一	1966	395,900,000
42nd	四十二	1967	158,900,000
43rd	四十三	1968	363,600,000
44th	四十四	1969	414,800,000
45th	四十五	1970	382,700,000
46th	四十六	1971	610,050,000
47th	四十七	1972	634,950,000
48th	四十八	1973	1,345,000,000
49th	四十九	1974	1,780,000,000
50th	五十	1975	1,280,260,000
51st	五十一	1976	1,369,740,000
52nd	五十二	1977	1,467,000,000
53rd	五十三	1978	1,435,000,000
54th	五十四	1979	1,207,000,000
55th	五十五	1980	1,127,000,000
56th	五十六	1981	1,369,000,000
57th	五十七	1982	890,000,000
58th	五十八	1983	870,000,000
59th	五十九	1984	533,850,000
60th	六十	1985	335,150,000
61st	六十一	1986	68,960,000
62nd	六十二	1987	165,775,000
63rd	六十三	1988	618,112,000
64th	六十四	1989	74,692,000

=== Heisei ===
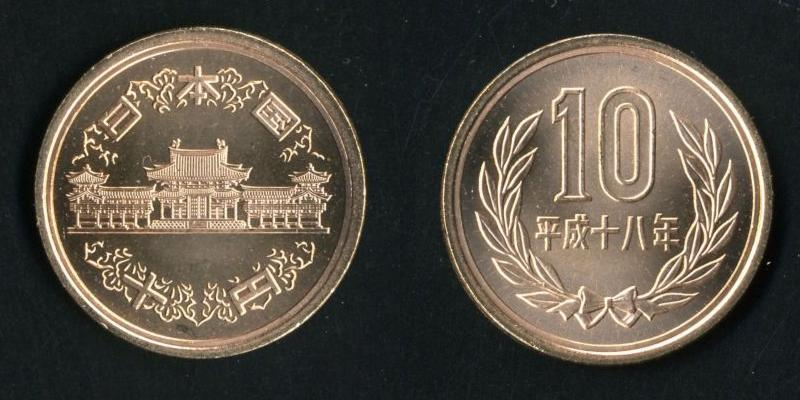
Heisei 10 yen coin from 2006 (year 18)

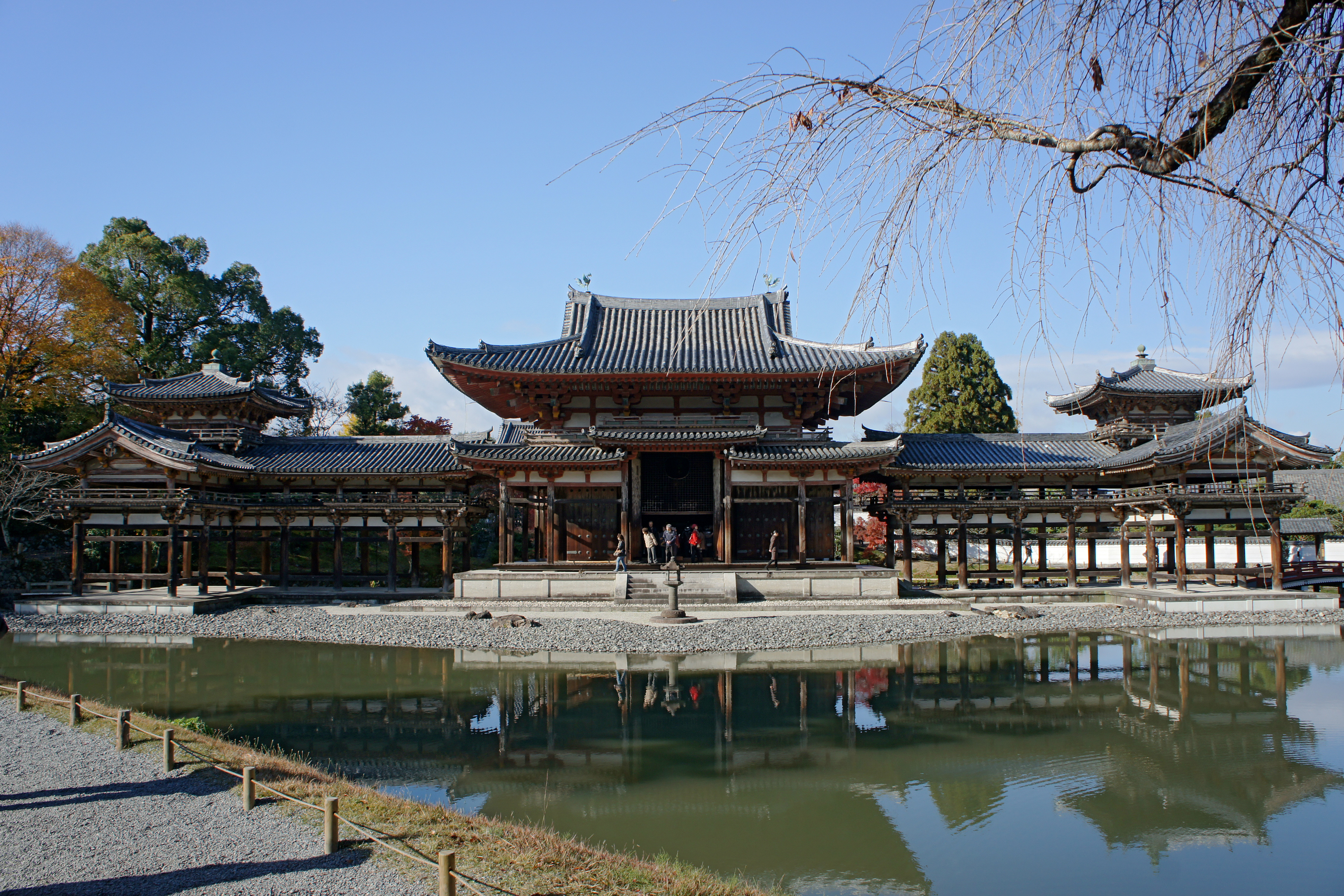
Phoenix Hall is featured on the obverse side of the coin.

The following are circulation dates during the reign of Emperor Akihito. who was crowned in 1989. The dates below correspond with the 1st to the 31st year (last) of his reign. First year of reign coins are marked with a 元 symbol (first) as a one-year type. Coins for this period all begin with the Japanese symbol 平成 (Heisei).

- Japanese coins are read with a left to right format:

"Emperors name" → "Number representing year of reign" → "Year" (Ex: 平成 → 十 → 年).

Year of reign	Japanese date	Gregorian date	Mintage
1st	元	1989	666,308,000
2nd	二	1990	754,953,000
3rd	三	1991	632,120,000
4th	四	1992	538,130,000
5th	五	1993	249,240,000
6th	六	1994	190,767,000
7th	七	1995	248,874,000
8th	八	1996	546,213,000
9th	九	1997	491,086,000
10th	十	1998	410,612,000
11th	十一	1999	359,120,000
12th	十二	2000	315,026,000
13th	十三	2001	542,024,000
14th	十四	2002	455,667,000
15th	十五	2003	551,406,000
16th	十六	2004	592,903,000
17th	十七	2005	504,029,000
18th	十八	2006	440,594,000
19th	十九	2007	388,904,000
20th	二十	2008	362,811,000
21st	二十一	2009	338,003,000
22nd	二十二	2010	328,905,000
23rd	二十三	2011	255,936,000
24th	二十四	2012	279,211,000
25th	二十五	2013	100,892,000
26th	二十六	2014	171,013,000
27th	二十七	2015	203,004,000
28th	二十八	2016	198,064,000
29th	二十九	2017	124,927,000
30th	三十	2018	178,960,000
31st	三十一	2019	197,594,000

=== Reiwa ===
The following are circulation dates in the reign of the current Emperor. Naruhito's accession to the Chrysanthemum Throne took place on May 1, 2019, and he was formally enthroned on October 22, 2019. Coins for this period all begin with the Japanese symbol 令和 (Reiwa). The inaugural year coin (2019) was marked 元 (first) and debuted during the summer of that year.

- Japanese coins are read with a left to right format:

"Emperors name" → "Number representing year of reign" → "Year" (Ex: 令和 → 二 → 年).

Year of reign	Japanese date	Gregorian date	Mintage
1st	元	2019	137,026,000
2nd	二	2020	276,428,000
3rd	三	2021	139,133,000
4th	四	2022	129,874,000
5th	五	2023	27,927,000
6th	六	2024	109,027,000
7th	七	2025	154,071,000
8th	八	2026	TBD

== Collecting ==
The value of any given coin is determined by survivability rate and condition as collectors in general prefer uncleaned appealing coins. The first ten yen coins were made from 1871 to 1892 with coins dated 1871, 1876, 1877, 1880, and 1892 using a dragon design. All of these dates outside of those from 1871 (year 4) are now rarely found for sale as they are highly valued. Coins with the latter of these two dates were never intended for circulation as coins dated 1880 (year 13) were part of presentation sets. It's now estimated that only four to five known "year 13" coins have survived with an example selling at auction for US$276,000 in 2011. No surviving examples are known for coins dated 1892 (year 25) which had been exhibited at the World's Columbian Exposition.

The second smaller design used for this denomination was minted from 1897 to 1910 after Japan officially adopted the gold standard. These are generally valued in lesser amounts than their predecessors, though rarer key dates in this group include coins dated 1904, 1907, and 1910. As a whole, the series dated from 1870 to 1910 can also be found on the market inside "Ministry of Finance" labeled plastic holders. These came from a hoard of 30,000 gold coins that were found to have been held by the Ministry of Finance. The Japanese government held a series of auctions from 2005 through 2007 which included previously unreported rare coins in denominations of 5, 10 and 20 Yen.

Modern ten yen coins date back to 1951 (year 26 of Shōwa) when the coins were struck for circulation using a bronze alloy. There is a misconception among the Japanese public that Giza 10 (ギザ10, Giza Ju) (yen made between 1951 and 1958) are worth a lot of money because of their reeds. On average these coins are worth only 3 to 4 times their face value, or in some cases just their face value. Ten yen coins from this period are only valued highly in uncirculated grades. Modifications to the ten yen coin were made in 1986 which show slight differences in the appearance of Byodoin Phoenix Hall. Those made in the latter half of 1986 with these temple changes were reported to be worth over $1,000 (USD) by TV Tokyo in 2019.
