= 1 rin coin =

Obsolete Japanese currency

One Rin
- Japan
- Value: 1/1000 Japanese Yen
- Mass: 0.91 g
- Diameter: 15.75 mm
- Edge: Smooth
- Shape: Circular
- Composition: 98% Copper; 2% Tin and Zinc
- Years of minting: 1873–1884 (Note: Coins dated "1880" "1892" (year 13 & 25) were not minted for circulation)

Obverse
- Design: Chrysanthemum crest above "1 Rin", legends separated by dots above.

Reverse
- Design: Value and denomination

The one rin coin (一厘硬貨) was a Japanese coin worth one one-thousandth of a Japanese yen, as 10 rin equalled 1 sen, and 100 sen equaled 1 yen. The coins are no longer in circulation, but they are bought and sold both by professional numismatists and by amateur coin collectors.

== History ==
One rin coins were first minted in 1873 shortly after Japan adopted a new currency system following the Meiji Restoration. This new system was based on units of yen with subsidiary coins in units of sen and rin. One rin coins were included as the lowest denomination, with a value of one-one thousandth of a yen per coin. At the time of its introduction the one rin coin was approximately equal in value to a one mon coin of the old currency system. All one rin coins are made from a bronze alloy, are five-eighths of an inch (15.75mm) in diameter, and have a weight of fifteen grains (0.9g). From 1873 to 1875 millions of one rin coins were produced per year before their mintage sharply dropped off. During this latter year, mint records state that 3,038,000 one rin coins were struck at Osaka between February and December 1875. This amount though, drops down to 223,190 when including the time period from August 16, 1875 to June 30, 1876. Modern estimates which are mentioned by Krause Publications give a mintage of only 23,000 coins produced for the years 1876 and 1877.

No coins were minted from 1878 to 1881 with the exception of 810 listed pieces being struck in 1880 for inclusion in gift sets to dignitaries. A few of these coins later found their way into circulation. One rin coins were eventually made for circulation again in 1882, when millions of coins were produced. These amounts later climbed into the tens of millions until the coin was abolished two years later. The decision to abandon the one rin coin in 1884 was due to their "inconvenient small size", which made them unpopular to use. (Note: For perspective: With a diameter of 15.75 mm, one rin coins are smaller than modern Euro cents (16.25 mm), U.S. Dimes (17.91 mm), Five pence coins (18.0 mm), and 1 yen coins (20.0 mm)) One mon coins of the old system were allowed to co-circulate with the rin until they were withdrawn from circulation on December 31, 1891. In the following year, one rin coins dated 1892 (year 25) were produced for a final time to have non circulating examples to display at the World's Columbian Exposition.

In 1896, The Journal of Commerce noted that older (Japanese) coins were still necessary for small transactions in rural areas. With their size still being an issue, one rin coins were excluded from this process as they did not circulate "at all". One rin coins eventually lost their value as it was noted by 1904 that a rin was worth 1/10 of a farthing or 1/20 of an American penny. All one rin coins were eventually taken out of circulation at the end of 1953 and demonetized. The Japanese government passed a new law during this time that abolished subsidiary coinage in favor of a single currency unit of yen.

== Circulation figures ==
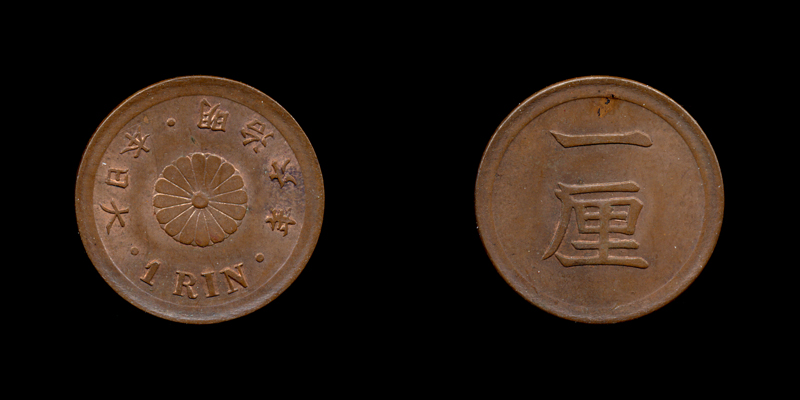
One rin coin from 1873 (year 6)

Meiji

The following are circulation figures for the one rin coin, all of which were minted between the 6th, and 25th year of Meiji's reign. The dates all begin with the Japanese symbol 明治 (Meiji), followed by the year of his reign the coin was minted. Each coin is read clockwise from right to left, so in the example used below "七十" would read as "year 17" or 1884.

- "Year" ← "Number representing year of reign" ← "Emperors name" (Ex: 年 ← 七十 ← 治明)

Year of reign	Japanese date	Gregorian date	Mintage
6th	六	1873	6,979,260
7th	七	1874	4,881,630
8th	八	1875 (Note: Two different varieties exist that have the character "MEI" being separate versus connected. Their mintage is combined in the following column.)	3,718,840
9th	九	1876	23,000
10th	十	1877	23,000
13th	三十	1880	810
15th	五十	1882	3,632,360
16th	六十	1883	14,128,150
17th	七十	1884	16,009,130
25th	五十二	1892	Not circulated (Note: 1892 dated coins were never intended for circulation as they were made for the World's Columbian Exposition as exhibits.)

== Collecting ==
Common dates for the one rin coin can usually be found online, and at pawn shops where prices vary depending on the condition of the coin. Outside of these dates are four rarities which sell for much larger amounts due to their low mintages. The first of these are dated 1876, and 1877 (year 9 and 10) which were intended for circulation. An example of a coin dated 1876 (year 9) brought $12,075.00 (USD) at auction in 2011, while a coin dated 1877 (year 10) sold for a lower amount in the thousands. The last two rarities dated 1880 (year 13) and 1892 (year 25) were not intended for circulation as they were specially made as presentation pieces. One rin coins dated 1880 (year 13) have a recorded mintage of just 810 pieces, but the actual amount struck is thought to be less. One example in AU58 condition sold for $12,650.00 (USD) at auction in 2011. Coins dated 1892 (year 25) were used for display in Chicago at the World's Columbian Exposition, and a unique piece sold for $63,250.00 (USD) in 2011. Certification by a coin grading service is recommended for one rin coins, as their simplistic design has made them a target of counterfeiters.
