= Japanese passport =

Passport issued to Japanese citizens

Japanese passport 日本国旅券
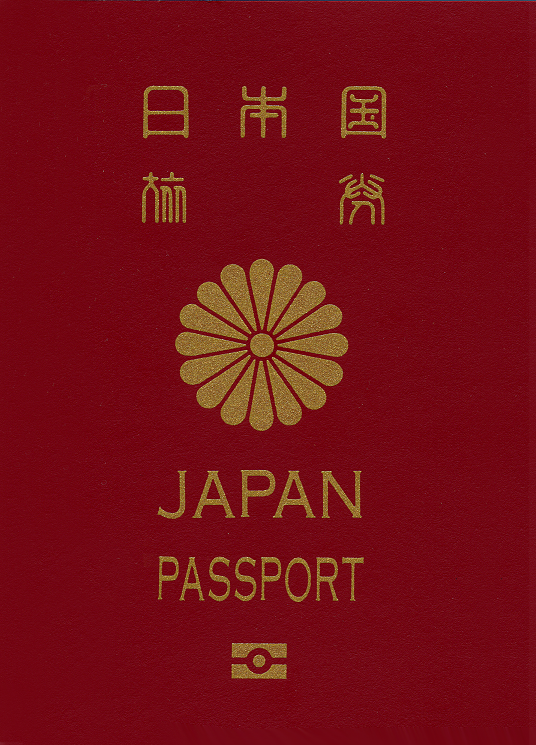
- The front cover of a contemporary 10 years Japanese passport

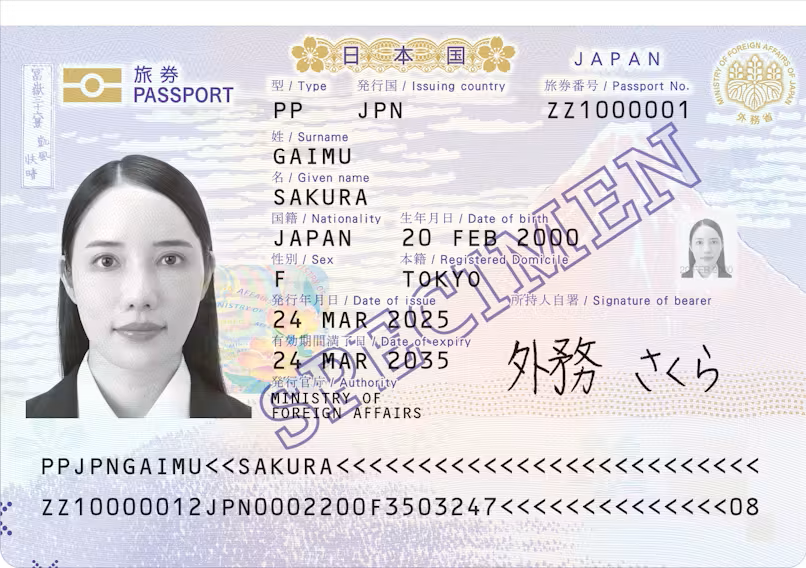
- Identity Information Page of a 10 years Japanese biometric passport
- Type: Passport
- Issued by: Ministry of Foreign Affairs
- First issued: 21 May 1866 (Note: 7 April 1866 in the Old Style lunisolar calendar.) (letter of request); 1 January 1926 (booklet); 1 November 1992 (machine-readable passport); 20 March 2006 (biometric passport); 31 August 2013; 4 February 2020; 24 March 2025 (current version)
- Purpose: Identification
- Eligibility: Japanese citizenship
- Expiration: 10 years or 5 years or shorter after acquisition for adults, 5 years for ages under 17
- Cost: 10 year passport if applied online (adults only); ¥8,900; 10 year passport if applied in-person (adults only); ¥9,300; 5 year passport if applied online (minors only); ¥4,400; 5 year passport if applied in-person (minors only); ¥4,800

Japanese passports (日本国旅券, Nihonkoku ryoken) are issued to Japanese nationals to facilitate international travel. From 2018 to 2022, it was ranked first on the Henley Passport Index for visa-free travel, and second as of April 2025, with holders able to travel visa-free to 190 countries and territories.

== History ==
Japanese citizens were first issued travel documents for overseas travel in 1866, near the end of the Tokugawa shogunate. These took the form of a stamped "letter of request" (海外渡航文書) that permitted travel abroad for business or educational purposes. The earliest known recipient was the acrobat and magician Namigorō Sumidagawa, who received his travel document on 17 October 1866 to perform at the 1867 Exposition Universelle held in Paris, France. The term "passport" (旅券) was formally introduced into the Japanese language in 1878, and the first regulations governing Japanese passports were enacted in 1900. The modern form of the Japanese passport first came about in 1926, and the first ICAO-compliant, machine-readable passports were introduced in 1992.

== Types of passports ==
- Ordinary passport (Red): Issued to ordinary Japanese citizens and have a validity of 10 years.
  - Ordinary passport (Blue): Issued to ordinary Japanese citizens and have a validity of 5 years. Japanese citizens under 17 years of age can only be issued a blue passport.
- Official passport: Issued to members of the National Diet and public servants.
- Diplomatic passport: Issued to members of the Imperial Family, diplomats and their family members, and high-level government officials.
  - In accordance with international conventions for heads of state, the Emperor and Empress of Japan do not possess passports.
- Emergency passport: Issued to overseas Japanese nationals when machine-readable passports are unable to be issued by a diplomatic mission of Japan due to a malfunction and there is no time to wait for the passport to be issued by the Ministry of Foreign Affairs of Japan, or to overseas Japanese nationals who failed to be issued a Travel Document for Return to Japan, valid for 1 year from date of issuance.
  - Travel Document for Return to Japan: Emergency single-use travel document issued to overseas Japanese nationals to return to Japan, features a white cover with the paulownia crest. It is invalidated immediately after use.

All Japanese passports issued after 20 March 2006 are biometric passports.

Japanese passports have the chrysanthemum crest inscribed in the centre of the front cover, with seal script Kanji characters reading Nipponkoku Ryoken (Japanese: 日本国旅券, lit. 'Japan Country Travel Certificate') inscribed above the crest and its English translation JAPAN PASSPORT in Latin letters below the crest. Ordinary passports valid for five years feature dark blue covers, and those valid for ten years feature crimson-coloured covers. Additionally, official passports feature dark green covers, and diplomatic passports feature dark brown covers.

=== Data page ===
- Photo of the passport holder
- Type
- Issuing country
- Passport number
- Surname (possibly followed by a former surname (Note: In some cases, an appellation (呼称, koshō) differing from the legal Japanese name (氏名, shimei) can be printed on the passport, enclosed in parentheses. It can be a former surname (旧姓, kyūsei), which is a legal Japanese surname that an individual once possessed, thus tied to one of the family registers (koseki) they were once part of. Otherwise, an alternative surname (別姓, bessei), or an alternative name (別名, betsumei) might also be allowed. An alternative surname (or given name) may be applied when, for example, another surname (or given name) is recognized by a foreign country of which the bearer is or was a citizen. These optional items are based on the ninth article of the Enforcement Regulations of the Passport Act. Those appellations are not included in the machine-readable zone, which contains exclusively the legal surname and given name.) or an alternative surname written in brackets)
- Given name (possibly followed by an alternative given name written in brackets)
- Nationality (always 'JAPAN')
- Date of birth
- Sex
- Registered Domicile (the location of the bearer's koseki)
- Date of issue
- Date of expiry
- Issuing authority
- Signature of bearer

The information page ends with the Machine Readable Zone.

== Passport photo requirements ==
A photo for a Japanese passport should meet specific requirements:

- Size: 35mm by 45mm and(pixels): 600 dpi minimum.
- Head size and position: From chin to forehead should be 32mm to 36mm.
- Photo must be in color.
- Must be taken in the last 6 months.
- Background: Solid white only. No other objects visible, like door, windows etc.
- Neutral face expression.
- 2 passport photos per application.
- Head cover is allowed for religious or medical reasons.

=== Passport note ===
The passports contain a note from the issuing country that is addressed to the authorities of all other countries, identifying the bearer as a citizen of that country and requesting that he or she be allowed to pass and be treated according to international norms. The note inside of Japanese passports states:

In Japanese:

日本国民である本旅券の所持人を通路故障なく旅行させ、かつ、同人に必要な保護扶助を与えられるよう、関係の諸官に要請する。 日本国外務大臣

In English:

The Minister for Foreign Affairs of Japan requests all those whom it may concern to allow the bearer, a Japanese national, to pass freely and without hindrance and, in case of need, to afford him or her every possible aid and protection.

=== Language ===
Japanese passports are entirely printed in both Japanese and English, except for the note of caution that is found at the end of the passport (e.g. on page 51 of the ten-year biometric ordinary passport), which is only printed in Japanese. This note contains information about what the bearer should know when encountering various situations in a foreign country.

The surname, given name and other personalised mentions (like registered domicile) are only indicated in Latin uppercase letters. The names of Japanese nationals are originally written in kanji, or, for certain individuals, in kana or a combination of kana and kanji; the transcription into the Latin alphabet is, in principle, carried out according to one variant of the Hepburn romanization system, but exceptions are admitted in certain cases, notably when the name comes from the katakana transcription of a foreign name (such as Japanese spouse or Japanese child of a foreign national), in which case the original spelling of the name in the Latin alphabet may be used. Diacritics are never used.

The signature may be written in any language and in any spelling the individual desires.

== Visa requirements ==
Countries and territories with visa-free entries or visas on arrival for holders of regular Japanese passports

Visa requirements for Japanese citizens are administrative entry restrictions by the authorities of other states which are placed on citizens of Japan. As of April 2025, Japanese citizens had visa-free or visa on arrival access to 190 countries and territories, tied with the South Korean passport and ranked the second most powerful passport in the world in terms of travel freedom according to the Henley Passport Index.

== Gallery of Japanese passports ==
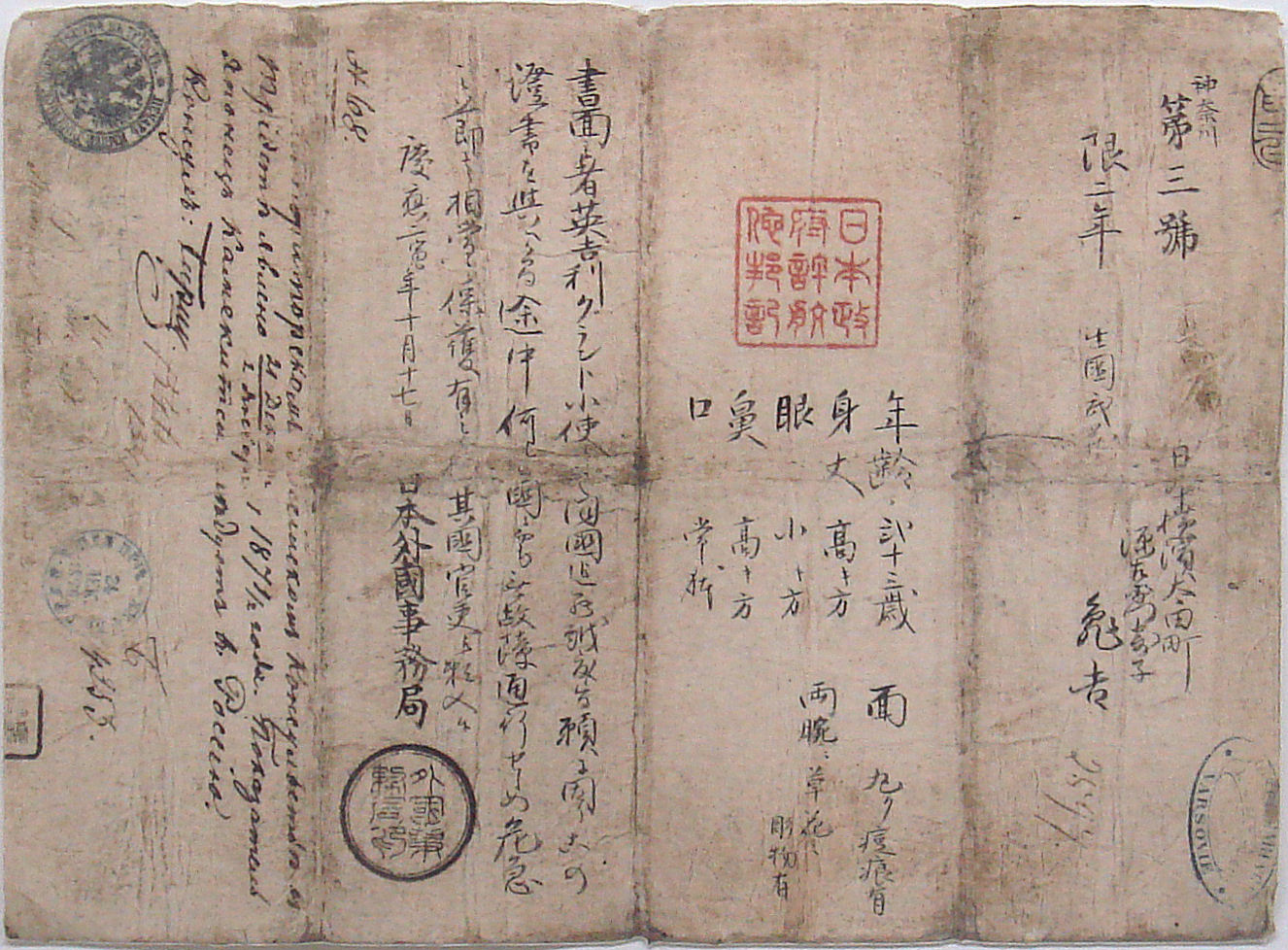
First Japanese passport, issued in 1866

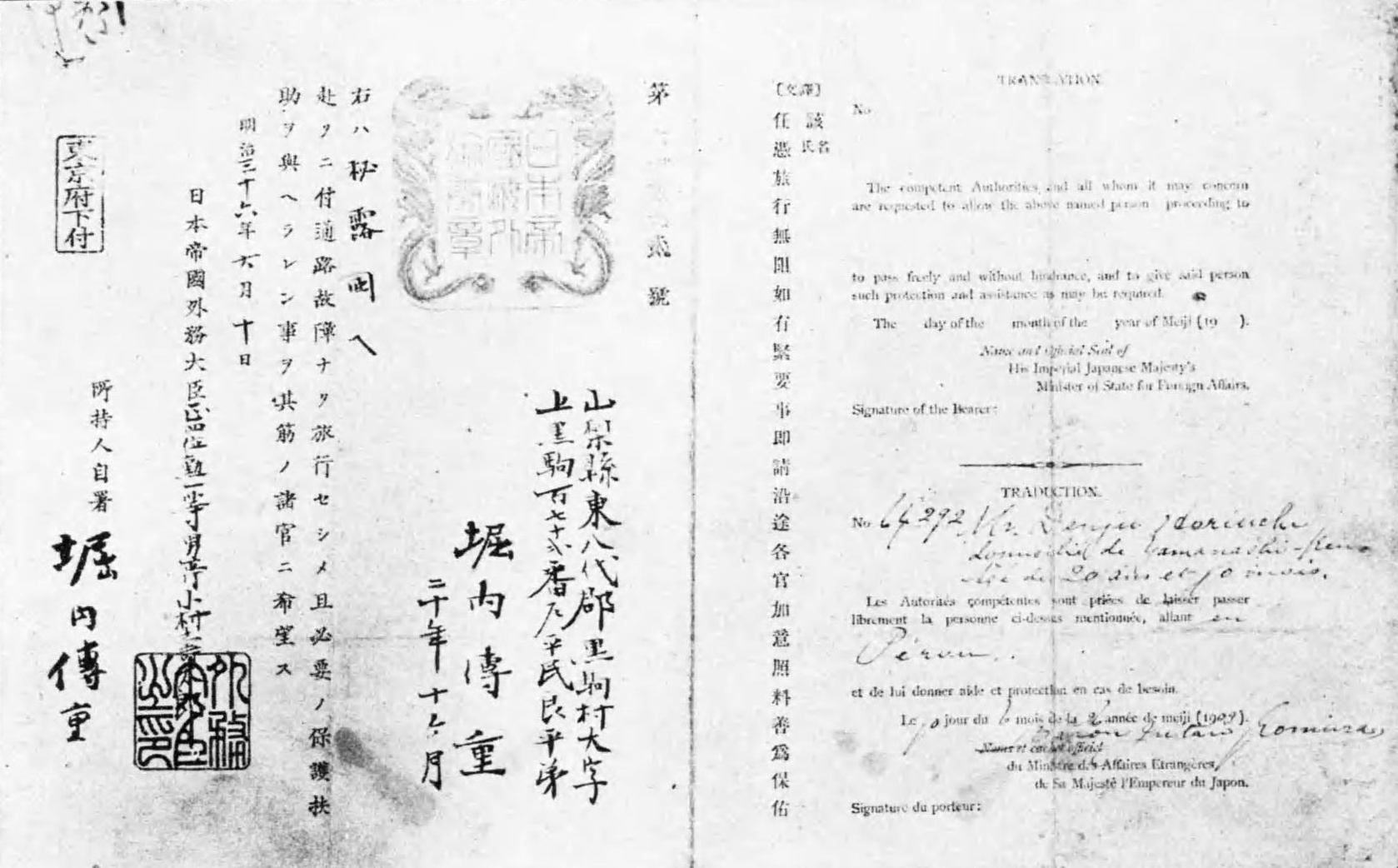
Japanese passport issued to Denjū Horiuchi (ja) in 1903

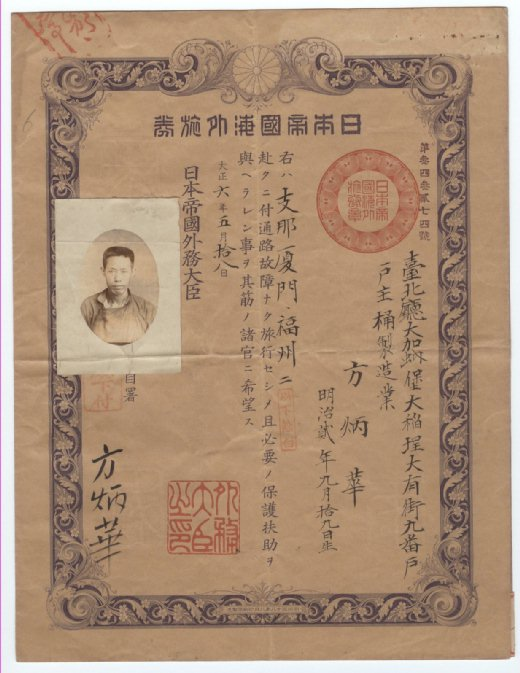
Imperial Japanese Overseas Passport issued in Taiwan in 1917

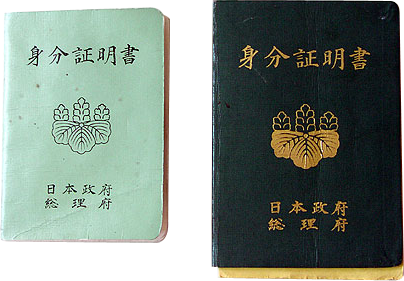
Restricted passports for passengers travelling between Mainland Japan and Okinawa during 1952–1972

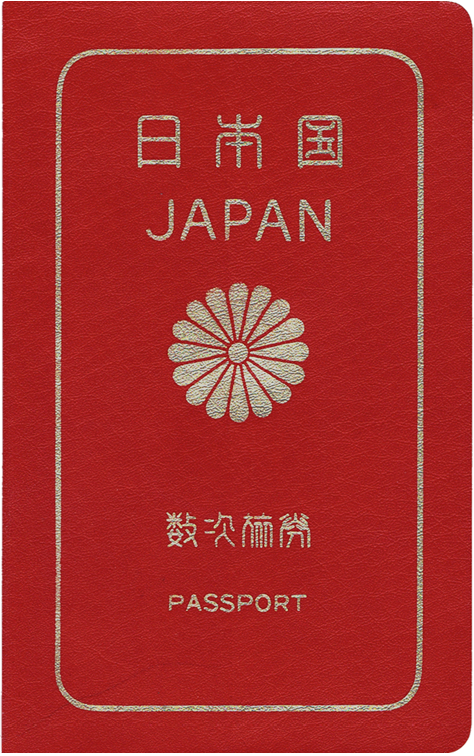
Front cover of a non-machine-readable Japanese passport issued in the 1980s

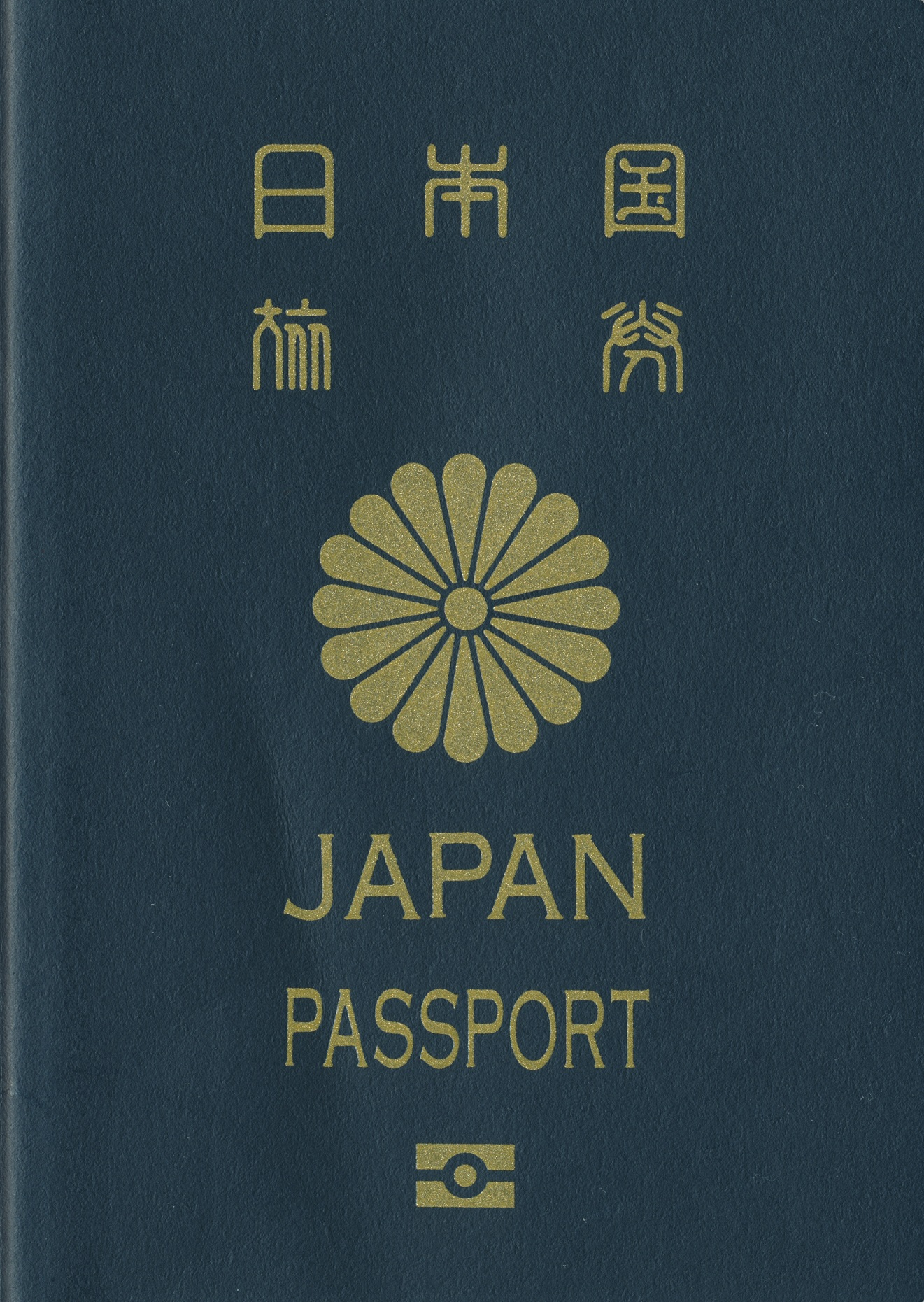
5 year validity Japanese passport

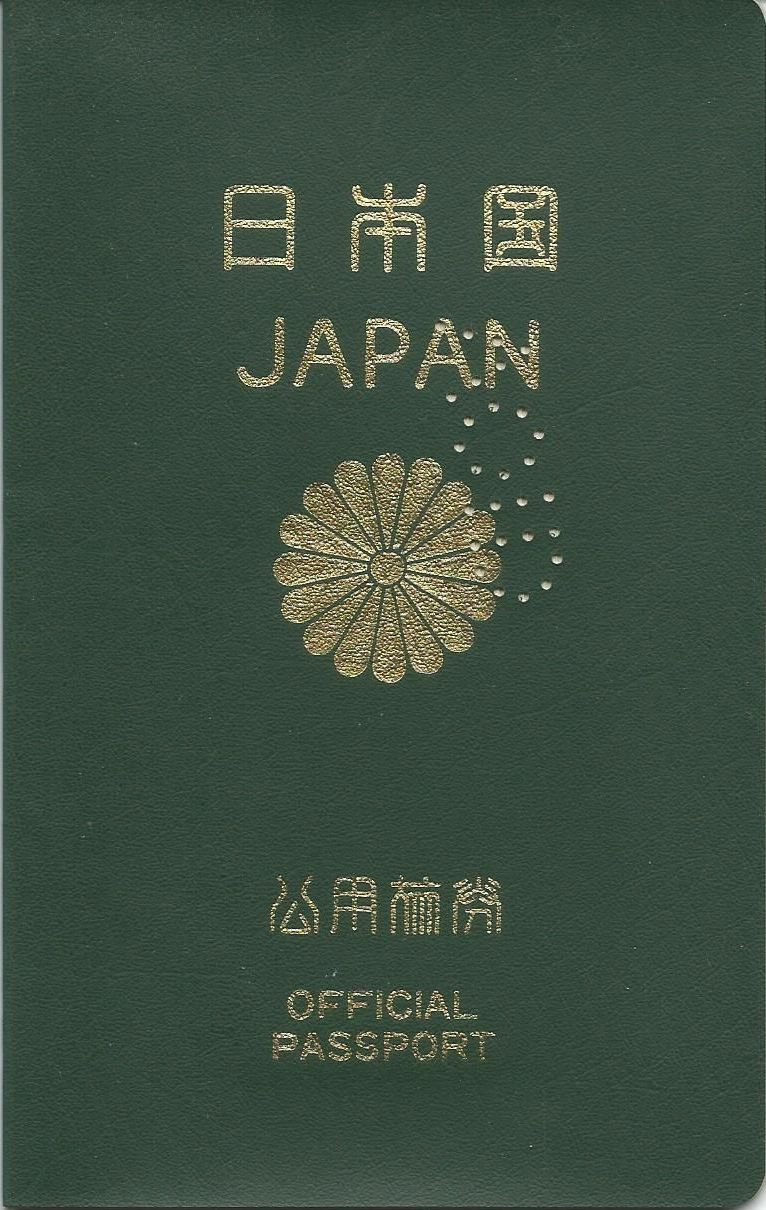
Japanese official passport

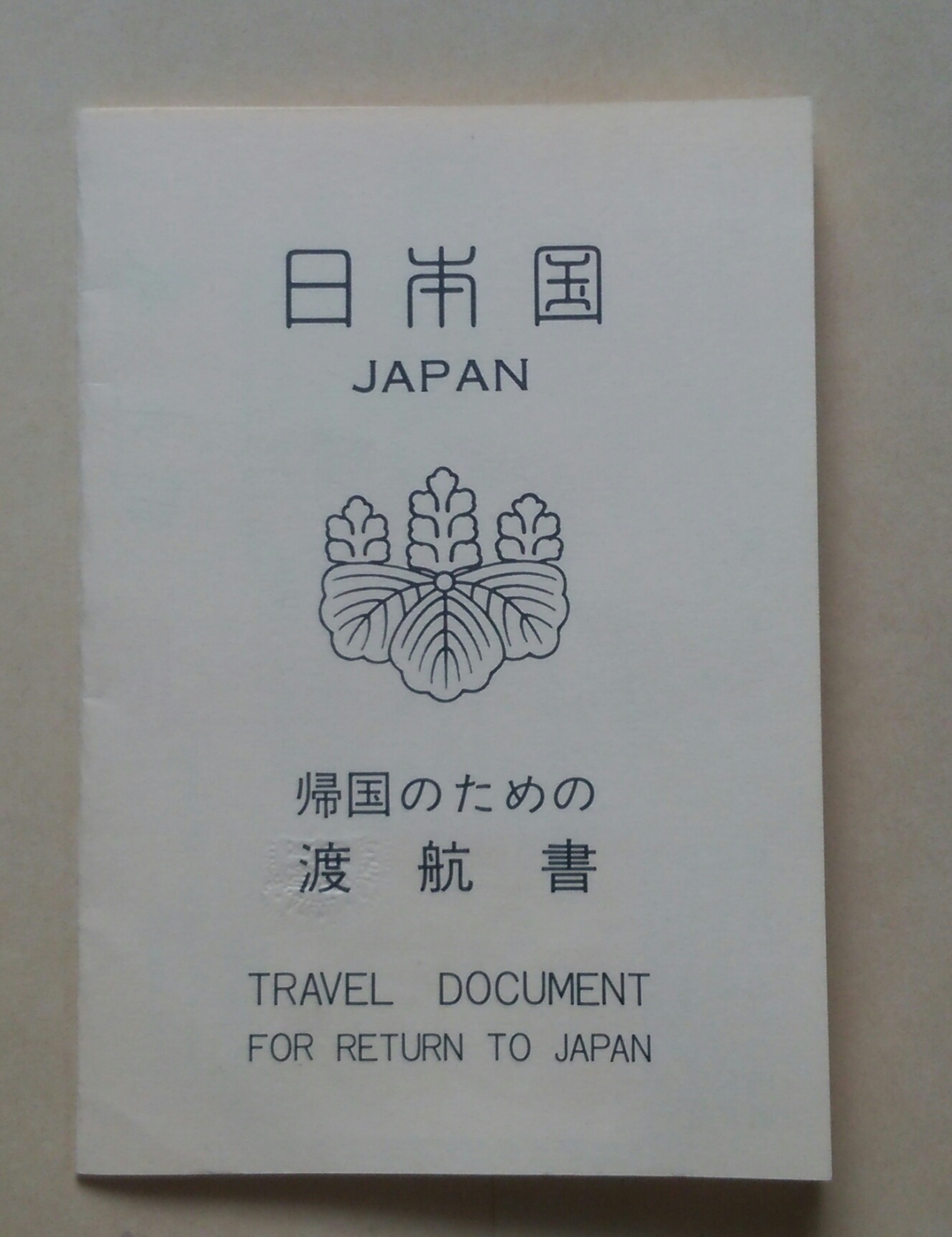
Travel Document for Return to Japan

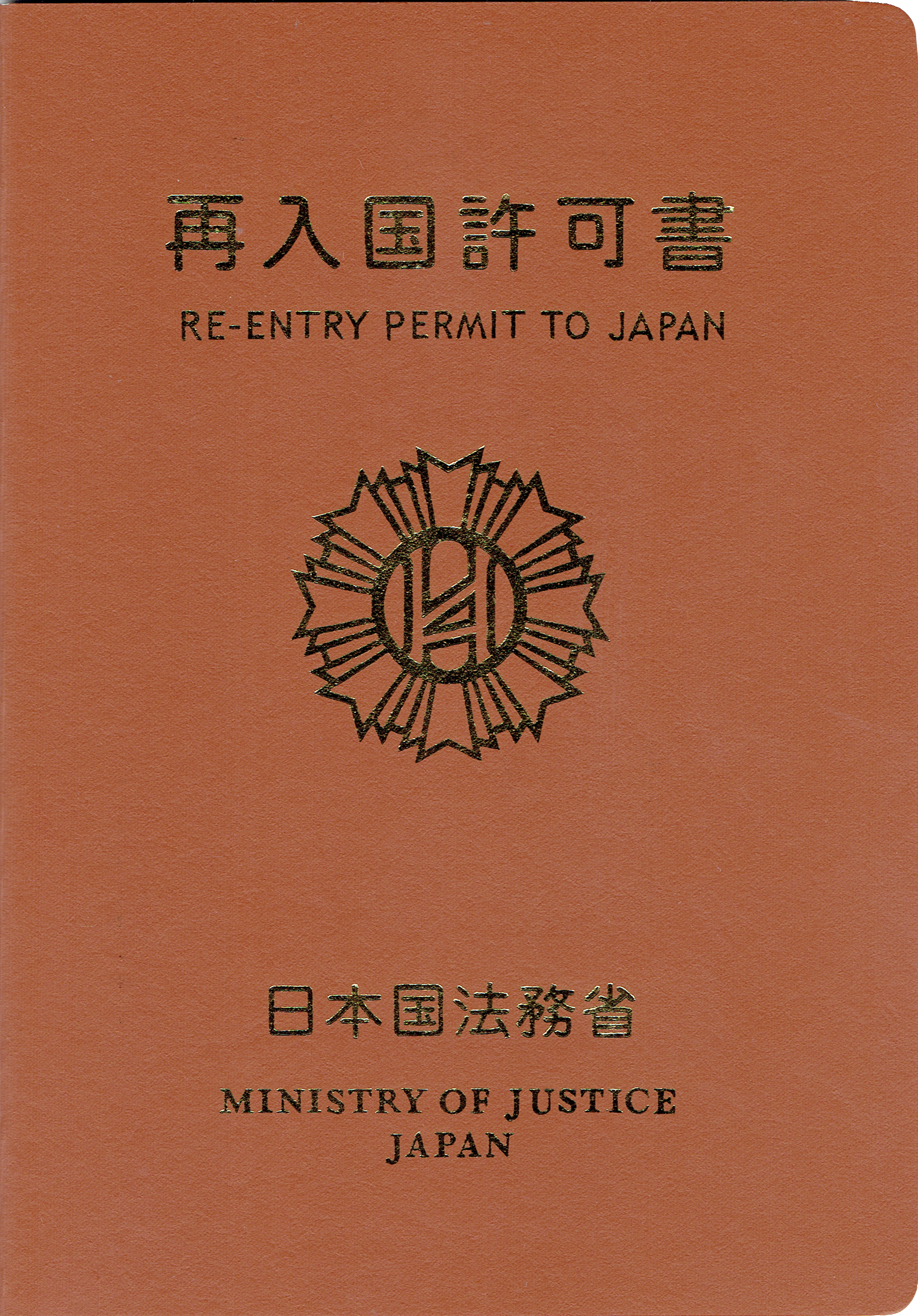
Re-entry Permit

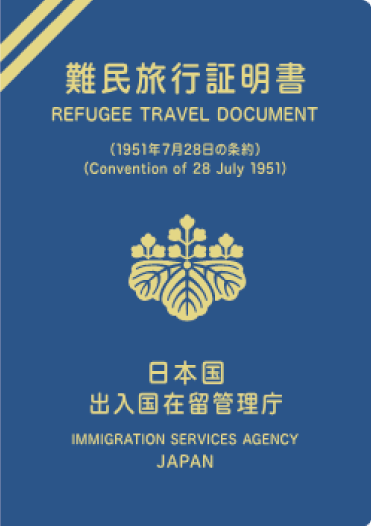
Refugee Travel Document, 2023- design

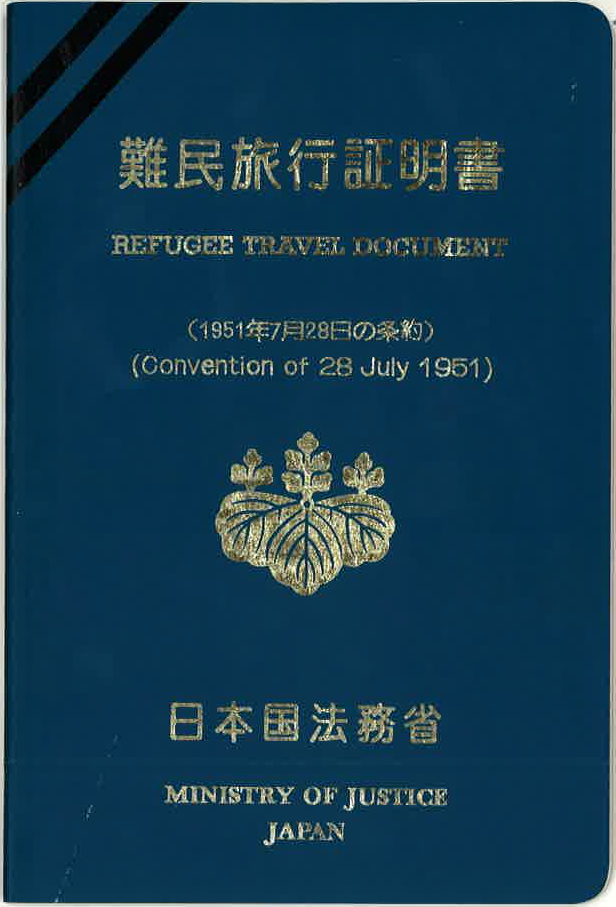
Refugee Travel Document, 1982-2023 design

== See also ==
- Japan Re-entry Permit
- Foreign relations of Japan
- Japanese nationality law
- Visa requirements for Japanese citizens
