= Japan Refugee Travel Document =

Form of official documentation in Japan

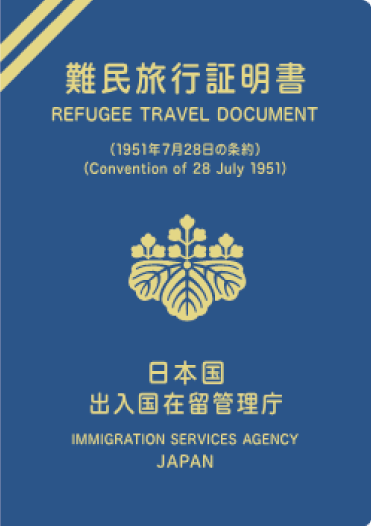
- The front cover of a Japan Refugee Travel Document (2023 design)
- Type: Travel Document
- Issued by: Japan
- First issued: 1982
- Purpose: Identification
- Eligibility: Refugees reside in Japan which the resident status was granted under 1951 convention
- Expiration: 1 year or the period of stay, whichever is shorter

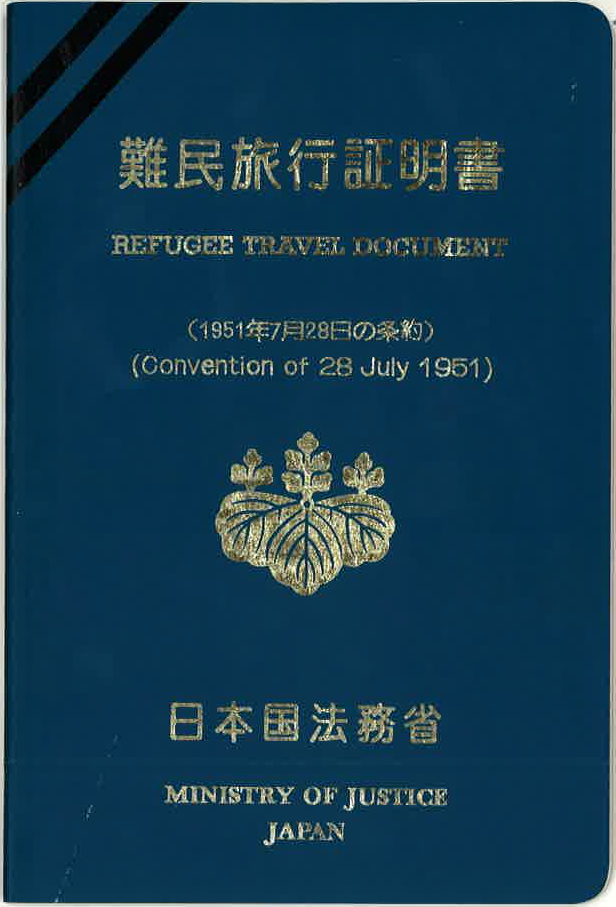
Japan Refugee Travel Document (1982 design) Front Cover

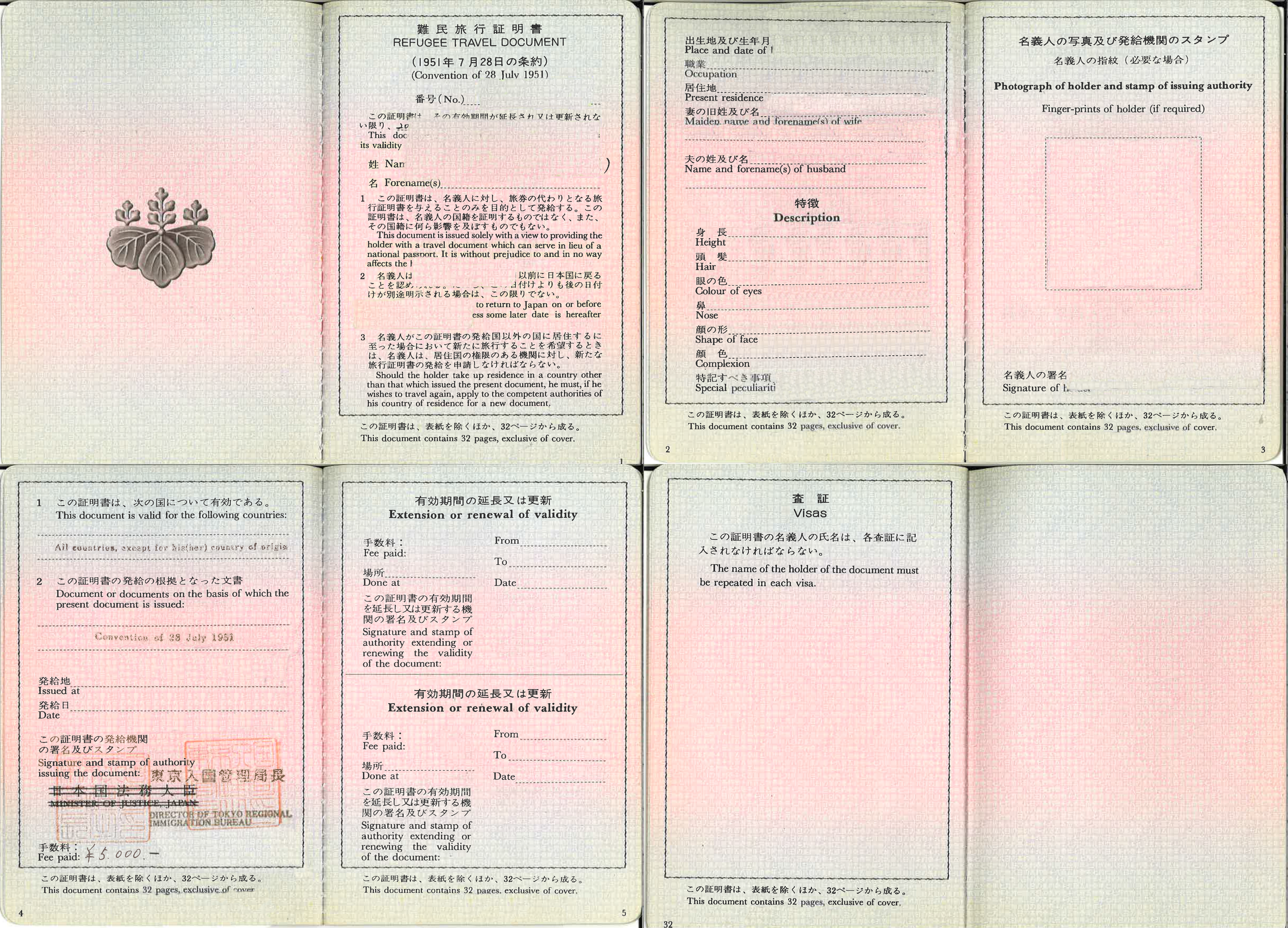
Japan Refugee Travel Document issued in 2018. Personal Information and Instruction pages(1-2), Photo and Signature Page(3), Endorsements Page(4), Extension Page(5) and Visa Pages(32)

The Japan Refugee Travel Document (難民旅行証明書), is a travel document issued by Japan's Ministry of Justice. It is a passport-like booklet with a dark blue cover with the words "難民旅行証明書 REFUGEE TRAVEL DOCUMENT" and two black diagonal lines in the upper left on the front.

== Eligibility ==
A foreign national resident in Japan with long-term resident status granted under the 1951 convention can apply for a Refugee Travel Document. De facto refugees holding resident status other than as a 1951 Convention Refugee, including those holding a residence status of student, designated activities, long-term resident, etc. under considerations of humanitarian, are not eligible for a Refugee Travel Document and are issued a Japan Re-entry Permit as an international travel document instead.

== Contents ==
=== 2023 Redesign ===
In 2023, the Refugee Travel Document underwent a major redesign. The current version adopts a modern, passport-like booklet format. It is the same size as a Japanese passport, includes a printed personal information page, and incorporates features similar in appearance to the Japan Re-entry Permit. However, unlike a Japanese passport, it does not contain a biometric passport chip.

=== Previous Design (Pre-2023) ===
Until 2023, the Japan Refugee Travel Document retained a design that dated back to the 1980s, which was an old style non-standard sized booklet with handwritten personal information, a pasted photograph, and minimal modern security features. The document consisted of 32 pages, including:

- Instruction pages (1–2)
- Photo and signature page (3)
- Endorsements (4)
- Extension page (5)
- Visa pages (6–32)

An unusual note printed on each visa page: "The name of the holder of the document must be repeated in each visa." The document only showed a return-by date, which served as the validity period. Due to the very limited number of refugees officially recognized in Japan under the 1951 Convention, the issuance of Refugee Travel Documents remains extremely low. As a result, the document was not frequently redesigned until the 2023 update.

== Usage ==
A separate Re-entry Permit was not required. When abroad, holders could extend the validity by up to six months at Japanese embassies or consulates.

== Fees ==
The issuance fee of Japan Refugee Travel Document is JPY5,000.

== Visa Free Access or Visa on Arrival ==
Since the refugee travel document is not a regular national passport, most countries and territories require visa prior to arrival.

The following countries and territories provide visa free access or visa on arrival, as they provide everyone such courtesies.

=== Asia ===
Countries and territories	Entry rights
Macau	Visa issued upon arrival for MOP100

== See also ==
- Japan Re-entry Permit
- Refugee Travel Document
- 1954 Convention Travel Document
- 1954 Convention Relating to the Status of Stateless Persons
- 1961 Convention on the Reduction of Statelessness
- Nansen passport
