= Travel Document for Return to Japan =

Form of official documentation in Japan

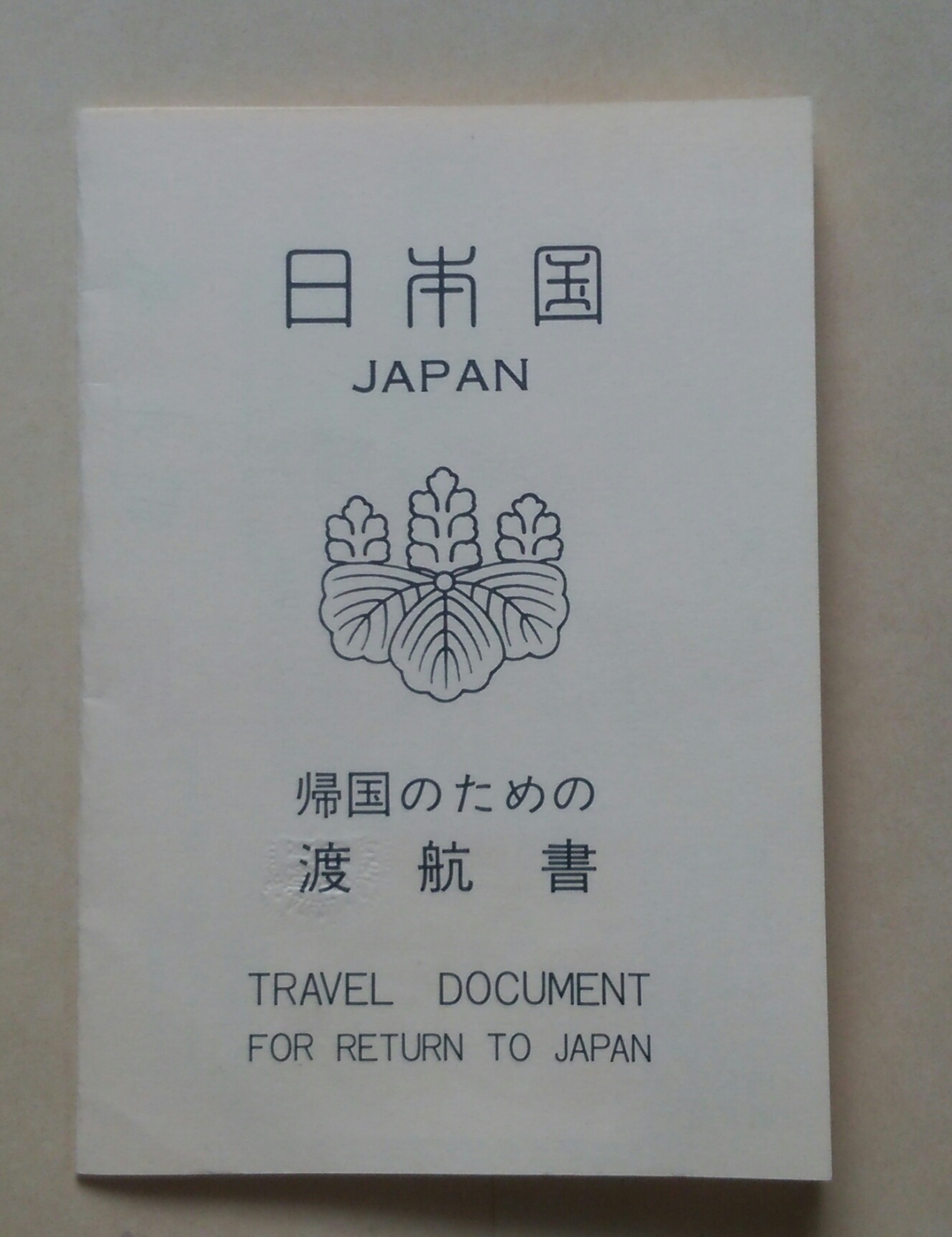
- Front cover
- Type: Emergency travel document
- Issued by: Japanese diplomatic missions
- Eligibility: Japanese nationals

The Travel Document for Return to Japan (Japanese: 帰国のための渡航書) is a temporary travel document valid for one-way travel issued by a Japanese diplomatic mission abroad to a Japanese national residing or staying in an area outside Japan whose Japanese passport has been stolen, lost, damaged, expired, or is no longer in their possession, and who must urgently return to Japan. It is stipulated in Article 19-3 of the Passport Law.

== Passport validity ==
According to Japanese law, once a travel document is issued, the holder's original passport becomes invalid, revoked from the Ministry of Foreign Affairs' database, and the passport number is published in the Official Gazette (Kanpō). In line with this, even if the holder's original travel document is found after the Travel Document for Return to Japan is issued, it cannot be used, and a new passport must be obtained if the holder wishes to travel again outside of Japan.

When applying for a new passport, one can request to keep the temporary travel document. In such a scenario, it is invalidated by being hole-punched with "VOID", and then returned.

== Design ==
Unlike the design of the passport which features the imperial crest of Japan, the Travel Document for Return to Japan features the 5–7 paulownia crest used by the Japanese government. The front color is beige.

== See also ==
- Japanese passport
