= Visa requirements for Japanese citizens =

Administrative entry restrictions

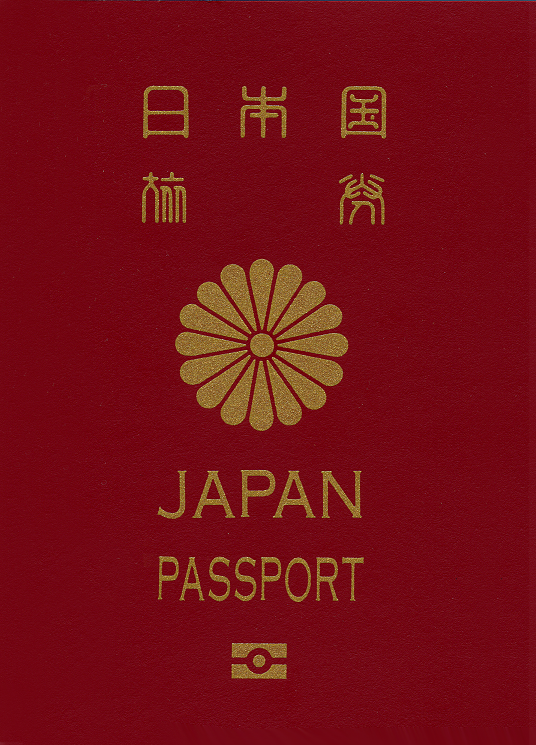
The cover of a biometric Japanese passport

Visa requirements for Japanese citizens are administrative entry restrictions by the authorities of other states placed on citizens of Japan.

As of 2026, Japanese citizens had visa-free access to 187 countries and territories, ranking the Japanese passport 2nd in the world according to the Henley Passport Index.

From 2018 to 2022, Japanese citizens had visa-free or visa on arrival access to the most countries and territories, making the Japanese passport rank first in the world in terms of travel freedom according to the Henley Passport Index. It ranked 2nd in 2023 and 2024.

== Visa requirements map ==
Visa requirements for Japanese citizens holding ordinary passports Japan Visa not required / ESTA / ETA (Note: ETA required for Australia, Canada if arriving by air, Israel, Kenya, Mozambique, New Zealand, Saint Kitts and Nevis, Seychelles and the United Kingdom) Visa on arrival eVisa Visa available either on arrival or online Visa required

== Visa requirements ==
Visa requirements for holders of normal passports travelling for tourist purposes:

| Country / Region | Visa requirement | Allowed stay | Notes (excluding departure fees) |
|---|---|---|---|
| Afghanistan | eVisa | 30 days | e-Visa : Visitors must arrive at Kabul International (KBL).; The Japanese government advises its citizens to refrain from traveling to Afghanistan for any reason due to safety concerns. |
| Albania | Visa not required | 90 days | |
| Algeria | Visa required | | Persons may be denied entry if entering with a passport containing visas or stamps issued by Israel.; Visitors on tours organized to some southern regions by an approved travel agency may obtain a visa on arrival for up to 30 days. |
| Andorra | Visa not required | 90 days | 90 days within any 180-day period. |
| Angola | Visa not required | 30 days | 30 days per trip, but no more than 90 days within any 1 calendar year for tourism purposes only.; Visitors must have a return/onward ticket and a hotel reservation confirmation.; An International Certificate of Vaccination is required. |
| Antigua and Barbuda | Visa not required | 6 months | |
| Argentina | Visa not required | 90 days | |
| Armenia | Visa not required | 180 days | 180 days within a 1-year period. |
| Australia | Electronic Travel Authority | 90 days | 90 days on each visit in 12-month period if granted. May enter using SmartGate on arrival in Australia. |
| Austria | Visa not required | 90 days | 90 days within any 180-day period in the Schengen Area. |
| Azerbaijan | Free eVisa / Visa on arrival | 30 days | Upon arrival at the any international airport, visitors can obtain visa through a kiosk.; e-Visa fee is free. |
| Bahamas | Visa not required | 3 months | |
| Bahrain | eVisa / Visa on arrival | 14 days | |
| Bangladesh | Visa on arrival | 30 days | Available at international airports in Dhaka, Chittagong, and Sylhet. |
| Barbados | Visa not required | 6 months | |
| Belarus | Visa not required / Free eVisa | 30 days | Must arrive and depart via international airport (Visa-free is not applied Russia - Belarus flight).; e-Visa is available at land border and airport.; e-Visa fee is free. |
| Belgium | Visa not required | 90 days | 90 days within any 180-day period in the Schengen Area. |
| Belize | Visa not required | 90 days | |
| Benin | eVisa | 30 days | Must have an international vaccination certificate.; Three types of electronic visa are offered: the e-Visa valid for 30 days for a single entry (50 EUR), the e-Visa valid for 30 days for several (multiple) entries (75 EUR), and the e-Visa valid for 90 days to make several (multiple) entries (100 EUR). |
| Bhutan | eVisa | 90 days | The Sustainable Development Fee (SDF) of 200 USD per person, per night for almost all visitors to Bhutan. Additionally, if payment is made in US dollars from September 1, 2023 to August 31, 2027, the SDF is 100 USD. |
| Bolivia | Visa not required | 90 days | |
| Bosnia and Herzegovina | Visa not required | 90 days | 90 days within any 6-month period. |
| Botswana | Visa not required | 90 days | 90 days within any 1-year period. |
| Brazil | Visa not required | 90 days | Up to 90 days per visit, but no more than 180 days per year. |
| Brunei | Visa not required | 30 days | |
| Bulgaria | Visa not required | 90 days | 90 days within any 180-day period in the Schengen Area. |
| Burkina Faso | eVisa | | The Japanese government advises its citizens to refrain from traveling to Burkina Faso for any reason due to safety concerns. |
| Burundi | Online Visa / Visa on arrival | 1 month | From December 2021, passengers of all countries that required visa, can now obtain visa on arrival at Bujumbura International Airport, and all land borders. |
| Cambodia | eVisa / Visa on arrival | 30 days | |
| Cameroon | eVisa | | |
| Canada | Electronic Travel Authorization | 6 months | eTA required if arriving by air.; Also, an eTA not required when arriving by car, bus, train or boat (including a cruise ship). |
| Cape Verde | Visa on arrival | 30 days | Available at Sal, Boa Vista, São Vicente, or Santiago international airports. Cost for a visa on arrival is around 25 EUR. |
| Central African Republic | Visa required | | The Japanese government advises its citizens to refrain from traveling to Central African Republic due to safety concerns. |
| Chad | eVisa | | |
| Chile | Visa not required | 90 days | |
| China | Visa not required | 30 days | Visa waiver is valid until 31 December, 2026.; 240-hour (10-day) visa-free transit to a third country or region (including Hong Kong, Macau or Taiwan) using any mode of transport. Must have a confirmed onward ticket/itinerary, and enter through 1 of 64 approved ports.; During which, may freely travel within the 24 provinces permitted for visa-free transit and engage in tourism, business, and visits.; 24-hour visa-free transit to a third country or region (including Hong Kong, Macau, and Taiwan), is available at most international airports, without leaving the airport.; Travellers who need to leave the airport may obtain a temporary entry permit from immigration.; 5-day port visa (Visa on Arrival) for Shenzhen if arriving at designated ports of entry from Hong Kong by land or sea, for stays within Shenzhen.; 3-day port visa (Visa on Arrival) if arriving in Zhuhai or Xiamen at designated ports of entry, for stays within the respective city.; 15-day visa-free entry for cruise ship passengers in tour groups, if arriving at any cruise port along China's coastline, including but not limited to Tianjin; Dalian; Shanghai; Lianyungang; Wenzhou; Zhoushan; Xiamen; Qingdao; Guangzhou; Shenzhen; Beihai; Haikou; Sanya. May further travel inland to all regions of coastal provinces (and equivalents) and Beijing.; May apply for a port visa (Visa on Arrival) if travelling for an urgent, qualified reason. Prior clearance for port visa is highly recommended or may be denied boarding by airlines. |
| Colombia | Visa not required | 90 days | 90 days - extendable up to 180 days stay within a 1-year period. |
| Comoros | Visa on arrival | 45 days | Nationals of any country can obtain a visa on arrival for a maximum stay of 45 days. Also, the cost is 30 EUR or 50 USD. |
| Republic of the Congo | Visa required | | |
| Democratic Republic of the Congo | eVisa | 7 days | |
| Costa Rica | Visa not required | 180 days | |
| Côte d'Ivoire | eVisa | 3 months | e-Visa holders must arrive via Port Bouet Airport. |
| Croatia | Visa not required | 90 days | 90 days within any 180-day period in the Schengen Area. |
| Cuba | eVisa | 90 days | |
| Cyprus | Visa not required | 90 days | 90 days within any 180-day period. |
| Czech Republic | Visa not required | 90 days | 90 days within any 180-day period in the Schengen Area. |
| Denmark | Visa not required | 90 days | 90 days within any 180-day period regardless of previous time spent in other Schengen countries (except the other Nordic countries). |
| Djibouti | eVisa / Visa on arrival | 90 days | |
| Dominica | Visa not required | 6 months | |
| Dominican Republic | Visa not required | 90 days | |
| Ecuador | Visa not required | 90 days | |
| Egypt | eVisa / Visa on arrival | 30 days | |
| El Salvador | Visa not required | 3 months | |
| Equatorial Guinea | eVisa | | |
| Eritrea | Visa required | | |
| Estonia | Visa not required | 90 days | 90 days within any 180-day period in the Schengen Area. |
| Eswatini | Visa not required | 30 days | |
| Ethiopia | eVisa / Visa on arrival | 90 days | Visa on arrival is obtainable only at Addis Ababa Bole International Airport.; e-Visa holders must arrive via Addis Ababa Bole International Airport.; e-Visa is available for 30 or 90 days. |
| Fiji | Visa not required | 4 months | |
| Finland | Visa not required | 90 days | 90 days within any 180-day period in the Schengen Area. |
| France | Visa not required | 90 days | 90 days within any 180-day period in the Schengen Area. |
| Gabon | eVisa | 90 days | e-Visa holders must arrive via Libreville International Airport. |
| Gambia | Visa required | | An entry clearance must be obtained from the Gambian Immigration prior to travel. |
| Georgia | Visa not required | 1 year | |
| Germany | Visa not required | 90 days | 90 days within any 180-day period in the Schengen Area. |
| Ghana | Visa required | | |
| Greece | Visa not required | 90 days | 90 days within any 180-day period in the Schengen Area. |
| Grenada | Visa not required | 3 months | |
| Guatemala | Visa not required | 90 days | |
| Guinea | eVisa | 90 days | International Certificate of Vaccination required. |
| Guinea-Bissau | Visa on arrival | 90 days | Holders of passports issued by all countries can obtain a visa on arrival for a maximum stay of 90 days. |
| Guyana | Visa not required | 90 days | |
| Haiti | Visa not required | 3 months | The Japanese government advises its citizens to refrain from traveling to Haiti for any reason due to the ongoing gang violence. |
| Honduras | Visa not required | 3 months | |
| Hungary | Visa not required | 90 days | 90 days within any 180-day period in the Schengen Area. |
| Iceland | Visa not required | 90 days | 90 days within any 180-day period in the Schengen Area. |
| India | eVisa / Visa on arrival | 30 days / 60 days | Visa on Arrival is only granted at Bengaluru, Chennai, Delhi, Hyderabad, Kolkata and Mumbai airport.; e-Visa holders must arrive via 32 designated airports (Note: Ahmedabad; Amritsar; Bagdogra; Bengaluru; Bhubaneswar; Chandigarh; Chennai; Coimbatore; Delhi; Gaya; Goa-Dabolim; Goa-Manohar; Guwahati; Hyderabad; Indore; Jaipur; Kannur; Kochi; Kolkata; Kozhikode; Lucknow; Madurai; Mangaluru; Mumbai; Nagpur; Port Blair; Pune; Surat; Thiruvananthapuram; Tiruchirappalli; Varanasi; Visakhapatnam) or 5 designated seaports. (Note: Chennai; Cochin; Mormugao (Goa); Mumbai; Mangalore); An Indian e-Tourist Visa may only be obtained twice within 1 calendar year.; Foreigners of Pakistani origin or who hold a Pakistani Passport are not eligible for an e-Visa. Foreigners who are not Pakistani nationals, but whose parents or grandparents (either paternal or maternal) were born in, or were permanent residents in Pakistan, are also not eligible for an e-Visa. |
| Indonesia | e-VOA / Visa on arrival | 30 days | |
| Iran | Visa not required | 15 days | 15 days within any 6-month period.; The Japanese government advises its citizens to refrain from traveling to Iran due to the political climate and the ongoing conflict. |
| Iraq | eVisa | 30 days | |
| Ireland | Visa not required | 3 months | |
| Israel | Electronic Travel Authorization | 90 days | |
| Italy | Visa not required | 90 days | 90 days within any 180-day period in the Schengen Area. |
| Jamaica | Visa not required | 30 days | |
| Jordan | eVisa / Visa on arrival | 30 days | Visa can be obtained upon arrival, it will cost a total of 40 JOD, obtainable at most international ports of entry and land border crossings (except King Hussein/Allenby Bridge). |
| Kazakhstan | Visa not required | 30 days | |
| Kenya | Electronic Travel Authorisation | 90 days | Applications can be submitted up to 90 days prior to travel and must be submitted at least 3 days in advance.; eTA fee is 32.50 USD.; Proof of reservation at the hotel where visitors plan to stay is required (if staying with friends, an invitation letter is also acceptable).; Yellow fever vaccination certificate is required if coming from endemic countries.; Can also be entered on an East Africa tourist visa issued by Rwanda or Uganda. |
| Kiribati | Visa not required | 90 days | |
| North Korea | Visa required | | The Japanese government advises its citizens to refrain from traveling to North Korea due to lack of diplomatic missions in North Korea. |
| South Korea | Electronic Travel Authorization | 90 days | Japanese citizens can enter South Korea as a short term visit (e.g., tours, visiting relatives or friends, attending simple meetings) up to 90 days without a visa, though you should remain aware of the quarantine requirements. You must also have an onward or return ticket. It's illegal to work on a tourist visa, whether as a teacher or in any other capacity.; All visitors are fingerprinted. From September 2021, travelers require the Korean Electronic Travel Authorization (K-ETA). The validity period is 3 years from the date of approval.; The government of the Republic of Korea announced that from April 1, 2023 to December 31, 2025, a K-ETA is not required for 27 countries' citizens visiting Korea for 90 days or less for business or tourism. |
| Kuwait | eVisa / Visa on arrival | 3 months | |
| Kyrgyzstan | Visa not required | 30 days | 30 days within any 60-day period. |
| Laos | Visa not required | 30 days | |
| Latvia | Visa not required | 90 days | 90 days within any 180-day period in the Schengen Area. |
| Lebanon | Free visa on arrival | 1 month | Extendable for 2 additional months.; Granted free of charge at Beirut International Airport or any other port of entry if there is no Israeli visa or seal, holding a telephone number, an address in Lebanon, and a non refundable return or circle trip ticket.; The Japanese government advises its citizens to refrain from traveling to Lebanon for any purpose due to safety concerns, as well as the ongoing conflict in Lebanon. Japanese citizens in Lebanon are advised to leave immediately. |
| Lesotho | Visa not required | 90 days | |
| Liberia | Visa required | | |
| Libya | eVisa | | The Japanese government advises its citizens to refrain from traveling to Libya due to the economic instability in Libya.; Independent travel is not permitted, and visitors must organize their visit through a tour guide. A tourist police escort is required at all times.; An eVisa will not be granted without a sponsor or tour agency.; A security letter issued by the Libyan Immigration Authorities may also be required.; Holders of passports containing an Israeli stamp or visa will be refused entry in Libya. |
| Liechtenstein | Visa not required | 90 days | 90 days within any 180-day period in the Schengen Area. |
| Lithuania | Visa not required | 90 days | 90 days within any 180-day period in the Schengen Area. |
| Luxembourg | Visa not required | 90 days | 90 days within any 180-day period in the Schengen Area. |
| Madagascar | eVisa / Visa on arrival | 90 days | For stays of 61 to 90 days, the visa fee is 59 USD. |
| Malawi | eVisa / Visa on arrival | 30 days | |
| Malaysia | Visa not required | 90 days | |
| Maldives | Free visa on arrival | 30 days | |
| Mali | Visa required | | The Japanese government advises its citizens to refrain from traveling to Mali due to the ongoing military situation. |
| Malta | Visa not required | 90 days | 90 days within any 180-day period in the Schengen Area. |
| Marshall Islands | Visa on arrival | 90 days | Visitors wishing to travel to Kwajalein are required to hold an Entry Authorization issued by the United States Military. |
| Mauritania | eVisa | 30 days | Available at Nouakchott–Oumtounsy International Airport. Only Nouakchott-Oumtounsy International Airport offers a Mauritania visa on arrival. Any other entry point necessitates a ride to the embassy. |
| Mauritius | Visa not required | 90 days | |
| Mexico | Visa not required | 180 days | |
| Micronesia | Visa not required | 30 days | |
| Moldova | Visa not required | 90 days | 90 days within any 180-day period. |
| Monaco | Visa not required | 90 days | 90 days within any 180-day period. |
| Mongolia | Visa not required | 30 days | |
| Montenegro | Visa not required | 90 days | |
| Morocco | Visa not required | 3 months | |
| Mozambique | Electronic Travel Authorization | 30 days | Visitors must register their ETA on the e-Visa platform at least 48 hours before travel and pay a processing fee of 48 USD. |
| Myanmar | eVisa / Visa on arrival | 28 days / 30 days | Visa on arrival - from October 21, 2025 for 1 year.; Must arrive via Yangon, Nay Pyi Taw or Mandalay airports or via land border crossings with Thailand — Tachileik, Myawaddy and Kawthaung. |
| Namibia | eVisa / Visa on arrival | 3 months / 90 days | Visa on arrival is available at the following locations: Hosea Kutako International Airport; Impalila Island; Katima Mulilo; Ngoma; Trans Kalahari (Buitepos); Walvis Bay Airport |
| Nauru | Visa required | | |
| Nepal | Online Visa / Visa on arrival | 90 days | |
| Netherlands | Visa not required | 90 days | 90 days within any 180-day period in the Schengen Area. |
| New Zealand | Electronic Travel Authority | 3 months | International Visitor Conservation and Tourism Levy must be paid upon requesting an Electronic Travel Authority. May enter using eGate.; Holders of an Australian Permanent Resident Visa or Resident Return Visa may be granted a New Zealand Resident Visa on arrival permitting indefinite stay (pursuant to the Trans-Tasman Travel Arrangement), subject to meeting character requirements and obtaining an Electronic Travel Authority prior to departure. Such travellers are not required to pay the International Visitor Conservation and Tourism Levy. |
| Nicaragua | Visa not required | 90 days | |
| Niger | Visa required | | The Japanese government advises its citizens to refrain from traveling to Niger due to security concerns. |
| Nigeria | eVisa | 30 days | |
| North Macedonia | Visa not required | 90 days | |
| Norway | Visa not required | 90 days | 90 days within any 180-day period in the Schengen Area. |
| Oman | Visa not required / eVisa | 14 days / 30 days | Japanese citizens are also eligible for e-Visas valid for 30 days. |
| Pakistan | eVisa | 3 months | |
| Palau | Free visa on arrival | 30 days | |
| Panama | Visa not required | 90 days | |
| Papua New Guinea | eVisa / Visa on arrival | 60 days | Available at Gurney Airport (Alotau), Mount Hagen Airport, Port Moresby Airport and Tokua Airport (Rabaul). |
| Paraguay | Visa not required | 90 days | |
| Peru | Visa not required | 90 days | |
| Philippines | Visa not required / eVisa | 30 days / 59 days | A single or multiple entry eVisa for stays of up to 59 days is also available.; Single entry e-Visa is valid for 3 months, while multiple entry e-Visa is valid for 6 months or 1 year. |
| Poland | Visa not required | 90 days | 90 days within any 180-day period in the Schengen Area. |
| Portugal | Visa not required | 90 days | 90 days within any 180-day period in the Schengen Area. |
| Qatar | Visa not required | 30 days | |
| Romania | Visa not required | 90 days | 90 days within any 180-day period in the Schengen Area. |
| Russia | eVisa | 30 days | Regular visa free of charge for Japanese passport holders. |
| Rwanda | eVisa / Visa on arrival | 30 days | Can also be entered on an East Africa Tourist Visa issued by Kenya or Uganda. |
| Saint Kitts and Nevis | Electronic Travel Authorisation | 3 months | |
| Saint Lucia | Visa not required | 6 weeks | |
| Saint Vincent and the Grenadines | Visa not required | 3 months | |
| Samoa | Entry permit on arrival | 90 days | |
| San Marino | Visa not required | 90 days | 90 days within any 180-day period. |
| São Tomé and Príncipe | Visa not required | 15 days | |
| Saudi Arabia | eVisa / Visa on arrival | 90 days | |
| Senegal | Visa not required | 90 days | |
| Serbia | Visa not required | 90 days | 90 days within any 6-month period. |
| Seychelles | Electronic Border System | 3 months | Application can be submitted up to 30 days before travel.; Visitors must upload a reservation confirmation(s) for each visitor's location of stay in Seychelles.; Yellow fever vaccination certificate is required if coming from endemic countries.; Payment of the fee (EUR 10) by credit or debit card.; Valid for one journey only and it expires once exit the country. |
| Sierra Leone | eVisa / Visa on arrival | 3 months / 30 days | |
| Singapore | Visa not required | 30 days | |
| Slovakia | Visa not required | 90 days | 90 days within any 180-day period in the Schengen Area. |
| Slovenia | Visa not required | 90 days | 90 days within any 180-day period in the Schengen Area. |
| Solomon Islands | Free Visitor's Permit on arrival | 3 months | Visitors may obtain a free permit valid for 3 months within any 1-year period on arrival. |
| Somalia | eVisa | 30 days | The Japanese government advises its citizens to refrain from traveling to Somalia due to no diplomatic missions, as well as the ongoing war in Somalia. |
| South Africa | Visa not required | 90 days | |
| South Sudan | eVisa | | Obtainable online 30 days single entry for 100 USD, 90 days multiple entry for 200 USD and 180 days multiple entry for 350 USD.; Printed visa authorization must be presented at the time of travel.; The Japanese government advises its citizens to refrain from traveling to South Sudan due to crime and economic instability. |
| Spain | Visa not required | 90 days | 90 days within any 180-day period in the Schengen Area. |
| Sri Lanka | Free ETA / Visa on arrival | 30 days | Electronic Travel Authorization subject to granting/issuing free of charge. |
| Sudan | Visa required | | The Japanese government advises its citizens to refrain from traveling to Sudan due to the ongoing military conflict in Sudan. |
| Suriname | Visa not required | 90 days | An entrance fee of USD 50 or EUR 50 must be paid online prior to arrival.; Multiple entry e-Visa is also available. |
| Sweden | Visa not required | 90 days | 90 days within any 180-day period in the Schengen Area. |
| Switzerland | Visa not required | 90 days | 90 days within any 180-day period in the Schengen Area. |
| Syria | eVisa | | The Japanese government advises its citizens to refrain from traveling to Syria due to the ongoing conflict in Syria. |
| Tajikistan | Visa not required / eVisa | 30 days / 60 days | Japanese nationals can obtain a single or multiple entry e-Visa online for USD 30 prior to arrival for a maximum stay of 60 days within 90 days. Along with e-Visa, visitors can apply for a permit to visit Gorno-Badakhshan Autonomous Province for 20 USD. |
| Tanzania | eVisa / Visa on arrival | 90 days | |
| Thailand | Visa not required | 60 days | Maximum 2 visits annually if not arriving by air. |
| Timor-Leste | Visa on arrival | 30 days | Not available at all entry points but obtainable at Presidente Nicolau Lobato International Airport or at Dili Sea Port.; Fee : transit 20 USD; tourist 30 USD; business 50 USD. |
| Togo | eVisa | 15 days | |
| Tonga | Free visa on arrival | 31 days | |
| Trinidad and Tobago | Visa not required | 90 days | |
| Tunisia | Visa not required | 90 days | |
| Turkey | Visa not required | 3 months | |
| Turkmenistan | Visa required | | For Japanese citizens coming to Turkmenistan for tourism purposes, a discounted rate has been established for issuing a one-time visa for up to 10 days. For Japanese tourists 10 days visa fee is 25 USD. Visa will be issued during 3 to 7 days by Embassy of Turkmenistan in Tokyo, depending on number of applications.; When transiting between two non-bordering countries, visitors can obtain a Turkmenistan transit visa for a five-day stay. This must be applied for in advance at the Turkmenistan Embassy. Visitors must also submit copies of the visas for the country of entry into Turkmenistan and the country of departure from Turkmenistan. Visa fee is 20 USD. |
| Tuvalu | Visa on arrival | 1 month | |
| Uganda | eVisa | 3 months | Determined at the port of entry.; Must apply online at least 2 business days prior to travel. As of March 2017, airlines may deny passengers permission to board flights to Uganda without proof that they had successfully applied for an e-Visa. Ugandan immigration authorities may require additional documentation, including proof of a return plane ticket and detailed tour itinerary in Uganda.; Can also be entered on an East Africa Tourist Visa issued by Kenya or Rwanda.; International Certificate of Vaccination required. |
| Ukraine | Visa not required | 90 days | 90 days within any 180-day period.; The Japanese government advises its citizens to refrain from traveling to Ukraine due to Russia's aggression towards Ukraine. |
| United Arab Emirates | Visa not required | 90 days | 90 days within any 180-day period. |
| United Kingdom | Electronic Travel Authorisation | 6 months | |
| United States | Visa Waiver Program | 90 days | ESTA is valid for 2 years from the date of issuance.; ESTA is also required when entering the country by cruise ship or land.; A Form I-94 is required for entry into the United States by land. It carries a $30 fee and can be obtained either online or upon arrival.; Visa required for nationals of VWP countries who have travelled or been present in Iran, Iraq, Libya, North Korea, Somalia, Sudan, Syria or Yemen at any time on or after 1 March 2011 or Cuba at any time on or after 12 January 2021, or nationals of VWP countries who are also nationals of Iran, Iraq, North Korea, Sudan or Syria. Exceptions apply if the travel was in military or diplomatic service of the VWP country.; ESTA is not required for Guam and Northern Mariana Islands. |
| Uruguay | Visa not required | 90 days | |
| Uzbekistan | Visa not required | 30 days | |
| Vanuatu | Visa not required | 120 days | |
| Vatican City | Visa not required | 90 days | 90 days within any 180-day period. |
| Venezuela | Visa not required | 90 days | |
| Vietnam | Visa not required | 45 days | A single entry e-Visa valid for 90 days is also available. |
| Yemen | Visa required | | The Japanese government advises its citizens to refrain from traveling to Yemen due to the ongoing civil war in Yemen.; Passengers can transit without visa with a confirmed onward ticket for a flight to a third country within 24 hours. They must stay in the international transit area of the airport and have documents required for the next destination.; Separately, Yemen introduced an e-Visa system for visitors who meet certain eligibility requirements (group travel of 10 or more people, business trips, and transit etc.). |
| Zambia | Visa not required | 30 days | Visitors are eligible for a universal (KAZA) visa allowing access to Zimbabwe. |
| Zimbabwe | eVisa / Visa on arrival | 1 month | Visitors are eligible for a universal (KAZA) visa allowing access to Zambia. |

=== Territories, disputed areas or restricted zones ===
Visa requirements for Japanese citizens for visits to various territories, disputed areas, partially recognized countries and restricted zones:

| Visitor to | Visa requirement | Notes (excluding departure fees) |
Europe
| Abkhazia | Visa required | Tourists from all countries (except Georgia) can visit Abkhazia for a period not exceeding 24 hours as part of an organized tourist group. |
| (Finland) Åland | Visa not required | 90 days within any 180-day period. |
| (Greece) Mount Athos | Special permit required | Special permit required (4 days: 25 EUR for Orthodox visitors, 35 EUR for non-Orthodox visitors, 18 EUR for students). There is a visitors' quota: maximum 100 Orthodox and 10 non-Orthodox per day and women are not allowed. |
| (Portugal) Azores and Madeira | Visa not required | 90 days within any 180-day period. |
| (Belarus) Brest and Grodno | Visa not required | Visa-free for 10 days. |
| (Germany) Büsingen am Hochrhein and Heligoland | Visa not required | 90 days within any 180-day period. |
| (Denmark) Faroe Islands | Visa not required | 90 days |
| Gibraltar | Visa not required | Up to 6 months. |
| Guernsey | Visa not required | 90 days within a 12-month period. |
| Isle of Man | Visa not required | Up to 6 months. |
| (Norway) Jan Mayen | Permit required | Permit issued by the local police required for staying for less than 24 hours and permit issued by the Norwegian police for staying for more than 24 hours. |
| Jersey | Visa not required | Up to 6 months. |
| Kosovo | Visa not required | 90 days |
| Livigno and Campione d'Italia | Visa not required | 90 days within any 180-day period. |
| Russia | Special authorization required | Several closed cities and regions in Russia require special authorization. |
| (Switzerland) Samnaun | Visa not required | 90 days within any 180-day period. |
| South Ossetia | Visa required | To enter South Ossetia, visitors must have a multiple-entry visa for Russia and register their stay with the Migration Service of the Ministry of Internal Affairs within 3 days. |
| (Norway) Svalbard | Visa not required | Unlimited period under Svalbard Treaty. |
| Transnistria | Visa not required | Registration required after 24h. |
| Turkish Republic of Northern Cyprus | Visa not required | 3 months |
| (United Nations) UN Buffer Zone in Cyprus | Access Permit required | Access Permit is required for travelling inside the zone, except Civil Use Areas. |
Africa
| Ascension Island | eVisa | 3 months within any 1-year period. |
| (Spain) Canary Islands, Ceuta and Melilla | Visa not required | 90 days within any 180-day period. |
| Eritrea outside Asmara | Travel permit required | To travel in the rest of the country, a Travel Permit for Foreigners is required (20 Eritrean nakfa). |
| Mayotte | Visa not required | 90 days within any 180-day period. |
| Réunion | Visa not required | 90 days within any 180-day period. |
| Saint Helena | Visa not required | |
| Sahrawi Arab Democratic Republic | Visa regime undefined | Undefined visa regime in the Western Sahara, same entry requirements with Morocco, controlled territory. |
| Somaliland | Visa required | |
| Sudan outside Khartoum | Travel permit required | All foreigners traveling more than 25 kilometers outside of Khartoum must obtain a travel permit. |
| (Sudan) Darfur | Travel permit required | Separate travel permit is required. |
| Tristan da Cunha | Permission required | Permission to land required for 15/30 pounds sterling (yacht/ship passenger) for Tristan da Cunha Island or 20 pounds sterling for Gough Island, Inaccessible Island or Nightingale Islands. |
Asia
| (Kazakhstan) Baikonur and Priozersk | Special permission required | Special permission required for the town of Baikonur and surrounding areas in Kyzylorda Oblast, and the town of Gvardeyskiy near Almaty. |
| British Indian Ocean Territory | Special permit required | Special permit required. |
| (Tajikistan) Gorno-Badakhshan Autonomous Province | OIVR permit required | OIVR permit required (15+5 Tajikistani Somoni) and another special permit (free of charge) is required for Lake Sarez. |
| (China) Hainan | Visa not required | 30 days |
| Hong Kong | Visa not required | 3 months |
| India PAP/RAP | PAP/RAP required | Protected Area Permit (PAP) required for whole states of Nagaland and Sikkim, and some parts of states Manipur, Arunachal Pradesh, Uttarakhand, Jammu and Kashmir, Rajasthan, Himachal Pradesh.; Restricted Area Permit (RAP) required for all of Andaman and Nicobar Islands and parts of Sikkim. Some of these requirements are occasionally lifted for a year. |
| Iraqi Kurdistan | eVisa | 30 days |
| (Iran) Kish Island | Visa not required | 14 days |
| North Korea outside Pyongyang | Special permit required | People are not allowed to leave the capital city, tourists can only leave the capital with a governmental tourist guide (no independent movement) |
| Macau | Visa not required | 90 days |
| Maldives outside Malé | Permission required | Tourists are generally prohibited from visiting non-resort islands without the express permission of the Government of Maldives. |
| Palestine | Visa not required | |
| (Malaysia) Sabah and Sarawak | Visa not required | These states have their own immigration authorities and passport is required to travel to them, however the same visa applies. |
| Taiwan | Visa not required | 90 days |
| (China) Tibet Autonomous Region | TTP required | Tibet Travel Permit required (USD 10). |
| Turkmenistan | Special permit required | A special permit, issued prior to arrival by Ministry of Foreign Affairs, is required if visiting the following places: Atamurat, Cheleken, Dashoguz, Serakhs and Serhetabat. |
| (United Nations) Korean Demilitarized Zone | Access restricted | Restricted area. |
| (United Nations) UNDOF Zone and Ghajar | Access restricted | Restricted area. |
| Yemen outside Sanaa or Aden | Special permission required | Special permission needed for travel outside Sanaa or Aden. |
Caribbean and North Atlantic
| Anguilla | Visa not required | 3 months |
| Aruba | Visa not required | 30 days, extendable to 180 days. |
| Bermuda | Visa not required | Up to 6 months, decided on arrival. |
| (Netherlands) Bonaire, Sint Eustatius and Saba | Visa not required | 3 months |
| British Virgin Islands | Visa not required | 30 days, extensions possible. |
| Cayman Islands | Visa not required | 6 months |
| Curaçao | Visa not required | 3 months |
| (France) French Guiana&Saint Pierre and Miquelon | Visa not required | 90 days within any 180-day period. |
| (France) French West Indies | Visa not required | 90 days within any 180-day period. French West Indies refers to Martinique, Guadeloupe, Saint Martin and Saint Barthélemy. |
| (Denmark) Greenland | Visa not required | 90 days |
| (Venezuela) Margarita Island | Visa not required | All visitors are fingerprinted. |
| Montserrat | Visa not required | 6 months |
| Puerto Rico | Electronic System for Travel Authorization | Visa not required under the Visa Waiver Program, for 90 days on arrival from overseas for 2 years. ESTA required. |
| (Colombia) San Andrés and Leticia | Tourist Card on arrival | Visitors arriving at Gustavo Rojas Pinilla International Airport and Alfredo Vásquez Cobo International Airport must buy tourist cards on arrival. |
| Sint Maarten | Visa not required | 3 months |
| Turks and Caicos Islands | Visa not required | 90 days |
| U.S. Virgin Islands | Electronic System for Travel Authorization | Visa not required under the Visa Waiver Program, for 90 days on arrival from overseas for 2 years. ESTA required. |
Oceania
| American Samoa | Electronic authorization | 30 days |
| (Australia) Ashmore and Cartier Islands | Special authorisation required | Special authorisation required. |
| (Australia) Macquarie Island | Special authorisation permit | A written authorisation of the Director of National Parks and Wildlife is required. |
| Christmas Island | Electronic Travel Authority | 90 days; Passports and visas are not required when travelling from the Australian mainland. However, photographic identification must be produced for clearance through Customs and Immigration. Normal Australian Customs and Immigration procedures apply when entry is made from outside Australia. |
| (France) Clipperton Island | Special permit required | Special permit required. |
| Cook Islands | Visa not required | 31 days |
| Cocos (Keeling) Islands | Electronic Travel Authority | 90 days; Passports and visas are not required when travelling from the Australian mainland. However, photographic identification must be produced for clearance through Customs and Immigration. Normal Australian Customs and Immigration procedures apply when entry is made from outside Australia. |
| French Polynesia | Visa not required | 90 days within any 180-day period. |
| Guam | Visa not required | 45 days |
| (Fiji) Lau Province | Special permission required | Special permission required. |
| New Caledonia | Visa not required | 90 days within any 180-day period. |
| Niue | Visa not required | 30 days |
| Norfolk Island | Electronic Travel Authority | 30 days; Visa is issued upon arrival for a visit of up to max stay of 120 days, for holders of a multiple entry Electronic Travel authority (ETA) issued by Australia, valid 30 days beyond the period of intended stay in Norfolk Island.; From 1 July 2016 all movement between Norfolk Island and Australian mainland are considered as domestic movement, however all passenger are still required to carry passports or, for Australian citizens, some type of photographic identification and pass Customs and Immigration. Normal Australian Customs and Immigration procedures apply when entry is made from outside Australia. Passenger not carrying their passports are not eligible to purchase duty-free goods on Norfolk Island. |
| Northern Mariana Islands | Visa not required | 45 days |
| Pitcairn Islands | Visa not required | 14 days visa-free and landing fee 35 USD or tax of 5 USD if not going ashore. |
| Tokelau | Entry permit required | 10 days/3 months/1 year. Visitors permits/Residence permits/Work permits/Special permits granted, allow the permit holder to be in Tokelau, for up to 10 days/3 months/1 year, unless otherwise specified. Apply for a travel permit at the Tokelau office in Apia, Samoa, at least 2 weeks prior to travel. Visitors are required to hold proof of sufficient funds to cover their stay.; The amount of funds needed is NZD 1,000 - per person per month of stay or NZD 400 - if accommodation. Tokelau can only be reached by boat from Samoa, and a permit from the Samoan Immigration Authorities is required to leave and re-enter Samoa. |
| United States Minor Outlying Islands | Special permits required | Special permits required for Midway Atoll, Wake Island, Johnston Atoll, Kingman Reef, Palmyra Atoll, Howland Island, Baker Island, Jarvis Island, and Navassa Island. |
| (France) Wallis and Futuna | Visa not required | 90 days within any 180-day period. |
South America
| (Ecuador) Galápagos | Pre-registration required | 60 days; Visitors must pre-register to receive a 20 USD Transit Control Card (TCT). |
South Atlantic and Antarctica
| Falkland Islands | Visa not required | A visitor permit is normally issued as a stamp in the passport on arrival, The maximum validity period is 1 month. |
| South Georgia and the South Sandwich Islands | Permit required | Pre-arrival permit from the Commissioner required (72 hours/1 month for 110/160 pounds sterling). |
| Antarctica | Special permits required | Special permits required for British Antarctic Territory, French Southern and Antarctic Lands, Argentine Antarctica, (Australia) Australian Antarctic Territory, Bouvet Island, (Antártica Chilena Province) Chilean Antarctic Territory, (Australia) Heard Island and McDonald Islands, (Norway) Peter I Island, (Norway) Queen Maud Land, (New Zealand) Ross Dependency. |

== Pre-approved visas pick-up ==
Pre-approved visas can be picked up on arrival in the following countries instead in embassy or consulate.

| Pre-approved visas pick-up on arrival | Conditions |
|---|---|
| Saudi Arabia | For a maximum stay of 15 days if the application was submitted at least 2 1/2 months before arrival and if the clearance was obtained. |
| Cameroon | Must hold approval from the General Delegate of Security. |
| Eritrea | Must have a sponsor who must submit an application at least 48 hours before arrival. |
| Liberia | Available only if arriving from a country without a diplomatic mission of Liberia and if a sponsor obtained an approval. |
| Nigeria | Holders of a visa application who have a Nigerian company taking responsibility for them. |
| Sudan | Holders of an entry permit issued by the Ministry of Interior. |
| Turkmenistan | Holders of an invitation letter of the local company that was approved by the Ministry of Foreign Affairs. |

== APEC Business Travel Card ==
Full members of the scheme Transitional members (United States, Canada)

Holders of an APEC Business Travel Card (ABTC) travelling on business do not require a visa to the following countries:

- Australia^{2}
- Brunei^{2}
- Chile^{2}
- China^{4}
- Hong Kong^{4}
- Indonesia^{4}
- Malaysia^{2}
- Mexico^{1}
- New Zealand^{2}
- Papua New Guinea^{4}
- Peru^{2}
- Philippines^{4}
- Russia^{3}
- Singapore^{4}
- South Korea^{2}
- Taiwan^{2}
- Thailand^{2}
- Vietnam^{4}

_{1 - Up to 180 days}
_{2 - Up to 90 days}
_{3 - Up to 90 days in a period of 180 days}
_{4 - Up to 60 days}

The card must be used in conjunction with a passport and has the following advantages:

- No need to apply for a visa or entry permit to APEC countries, as the card is treated as such (except by Canada and United States)
- Undertake legitimate business in participating economies
- Expedited border crossing in all member economies, including transitional members

== Consular protection of Japanese citizens abroad ==
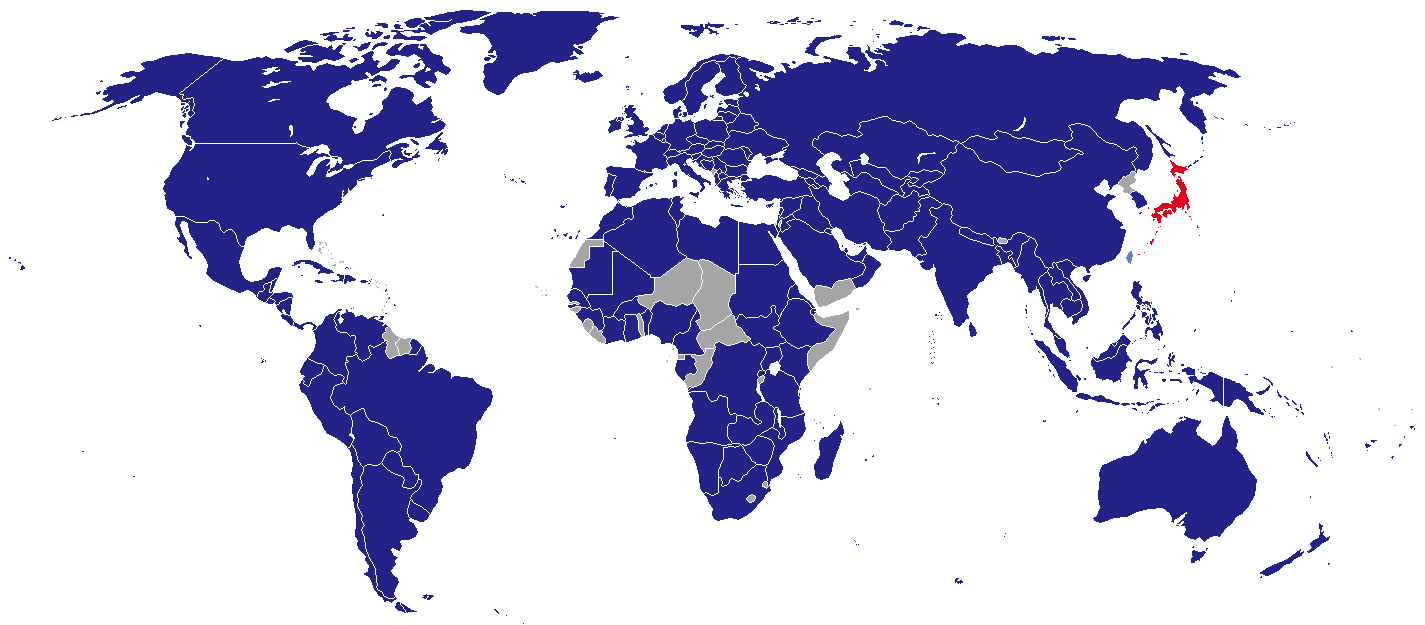
Diplomatic missions of Japan

== Non-visa restrictions ==
=== Blank passport pages ===
Many countries require a minimum number of blank pages to be available in the passport being presented, typically one or two pages. Endorsement pages, which often appear after the visa pages, are not counted as being valid or available.

=== Vaccination ===
Cover of the new International Certificate of Vaccination issued by the Bureau of Quarantine in the Philippines since 2021

The African countries of Angola, Benin, Burkina Faso, Burundi, Cameroon, Central African Republic, Democratic Republic of the Congo, Republic of the Congo, Côte d'Ivoire, Gabon, Ghana, Guinea-Bissau, Mali, Niger, Sierra Leone and Togo, South Sudan and Uganda, along with French Guiana in South America, require all incoming passengers older than nine months to one year, to have a current International Certificate of Vaccination or Prophylaxis.

Some other countries require vaccination only if the passenger is coming from an infected area or has visited one recently or has transited for 12 hours in those countries: Algeria, Botswana, Cabo Verde, Chad, Djibouti, Egypt, Eswatini, Ethiopia, Gambia, Ghana, Guinea, Lesotho, Libya, Equatorial Guinea, Eritrea, Madagascar, Malawi, Mauritania, Mauritius, Mozambique, Namibia, Nigeria, Papua New Guinea, Seychelles, Somalia, South Africa, Sudan, Tunisia, Uganda, Tanzania, Zambia and Zimbabwe.

=== Passport validity length ===
Very few countries, such as Paraguay, just require a valid passport on arrival.

However many countries and groupings now require only an identity card – especially from their neighbours. Other countries may have special bilateral arrangements that depart from the generality of their passport validity length policies to shorten the period of passport validity required for each other's citizens or even accept passports that have already expired (but not been cancelled).

Some countries, such as Japan, Ireland and the United Kingdom, require a passport valid throughout the period of the intended stay.

In the absence of specific bilateral agreements, countries requiring passports to be valid for at least 6 more months on arrival include Afghanistan, Algeria, Anguilla, Bahrain, Bhutan, Botswana, British Virgin Islands, Brunei, Cambodia, Cameroon, Cape Verde, Cayman Islands, Central African Republic, Chad, Comoros, Costa Rica, Côte d'Ivoire, Curaçao, Ecuador, Egypt, El Salvador, Equatorial Guinea, Fiji, Gabon, Guinea Bissau, Guyana, Haiti, India, Indonesia, Iran, Iraq, Israel, Jordan, Kenya, Kiribati, Kuwait, Laos, Madagascar, Malaysia, Marshall Islands, Mongolia, Myanmar, Namibia, Nepal, Nicaragua, Nigeria, Oman, Palau, Papua New Guinea, Peru, Philippines, Qatar, Rwanda, Samoa, Saudi Arabia, Singapore, Solomon Islands, Somalia, Sri Lanka, Sudan, Suriname, Tanzania, Thailand, Timor-Leste, Tokelau, Tonga, Turkey, Tuvalu, Uganda, United Arab Emirates, Vanuatu, Venezuela, and Vietnam.

Countries requiring passports valid for at least 4 months on arrival include Micronesia and Zambia.

Countries requiring passports with a validity of at least 3 months beyond the date of intended departure include Azerbaijan, Bosnia and Herzegovina, Honduras, Montenegro, Nauru, Moldova and New Zealand. Similarly, the EEA countries of Iceland, Liechtenstein, Norway, all European Union countries (except Ireland) together with Switzerland also require 3 months validity beyond the date of the bearer's intended departure unless the bearer is an EEA or Swiss national.

Countries requiring passports valid for at least 3 months on arrival include Albania, North Macedonia, Panama, and Senegal.

Bermuda requires passports to be valid for at least 45 days upon entry.

Countries that require a passport validity of at least one month beyond the date of intended departure include Eritrea, Hong Kong, Lebanon, Macau, the Maldives and South Africa.

==== Maximum passport age ====
Countries of the Schengen area require non-EU passports to be less than 10 years old upon entry.

=== Criminal record ===
Some countries, including Australia, Canada, Fiji, New Zealand and the United States, routinely deny entry to non-citizens who have a criminal record, while others impose restrictions depending on the type of conviction and the length of the sentence.

=== Persona non grata ===
The government of a country can declare a diplomat persona non grata, banning them from entering the country or expelling them if they have already entered. In non-diplomatic use, the authorities of a country may also declare a foreigner persona non grata permanently or temporarily, usually because of unlawful activity.

=== Israeli stamps ===
Kuwait, Lebanon, Libya, and Yemen do not allow entry to people with passport stamps from Israel or whose passports have either a used or an unused Israeli visa, or where there is evidence of previous travel to Israel such as entry or exit stamps from neighbouring border posts in transit countries such as Jordan and Egypt.

To circumvent this Arab League boycott of Israel, the Israeli immigration services have now mostly ceased to stamp foreign nationals' passports on either entry to or exit from Israel (unless the entry is for some work-related purposes). Since 15 January 2013, Israel no longer stamps foreign passports at Ben Gurion Airport. Passports are still (as of 22 June 2017) stamped at Erez when passing into and out of Gaza.

Iran refuses admission to holders of passports containing an Israeli visa or stamp that is less than 12 months old.

=== Biometrics ===
Several countries mandate that all travellers, or all foreign travellers, be fingerprinted on arrival and will refuse admission to or even arrest travellers who refuse to comply. In some countries, such as the United States, this may apply even to transit passengers who merely wish to change planes rather than go landside.

Fingerprinting countries/regions include Afghanistan, Argentina, Brunei, Cambodia, China, Ethiopia, Ghana, Guinea, India, Japan, Kenya (both fingerprints and a photo are taken), Malaysia upon entry and departure, Mongolia, Saudi Arabia, the Schengen Area, Singapore, South Korea, Taiwan, Thailand, Uganda, the United Arab Emirates and the United States.

Many countries also require a photo be taken of people entering the country. The United States, which does not fully implement exit control formalities at its land frontiers (although long mandated by its own legislation), intends to implement facial recognition for passengers departing from international airports to identify people who overstay their visa.

Together with fingerprint and face recognition, iris scanning is one of three biometric identification technologies internationally standardised since 2006 by the International Civil Aviation Organization (ICAO) for use in e-passports and the United Arab Emirates conducts iris scanning on visitors who need to apply for a visa. The United States Department of Homeland Security has announced plans to greatly increase the biometric data it collects at US borders. In 2018, Singapore began trials of iris scanning at three land and maritime immigration checkpoints.

== See also ==
- Visa policy of Japan
- Japanese passport
- Visa requirements for United States citizens
