= Japanese nationality law =

Nationality Law

National Diet
- Citation: No. 147 of 1950
- Territorial extent: Japan
- Assented to by: Emperor Shōwa
- Royal assent: May 4, 1950
- Commenced: July 1, 1950
- Administered by: Ministry of Justice
- Status: Amended

The primary law governing nationality of Japan is the 1950 Nationality Law, which came into force on July 1, 1950.

Children born to at least one Japanese parent are generally automatically nationals at birth. Birth in Japan does not by itself entitle a child to Japanese nationality, except when a child would otherwise be stateless. Foreign nationals may acquire citizenship by naturalization after living in the country for at least five years and renouncing any previous nationalities.

== Terminology ==
The distinction between the meaning of the terms citizenship and nationality is not always clear in the English language and differs by country. Generally, nationality refers a person's legal belonging to a country and is the common term used in international treaties when referring to members of a state; citizenship refers to the set of rights and duties a person has in that nation.

The term "nationality" (国籍, kokuseki) is used in Japanese to refer to state membership. A naturalized individual receives the same rights as a native-born Japanese person after obtaining kokuseki and becoming a national (国民, kokumin). The word "citizenship" (市民権, shiminken) has several meanings but is typically used to describe a person's political rights and status in a country.

== History ==
Prior to 1947, in an example of jus matrimonii, marrying a Japanese national and becoming the koshu (head of the Japanese house) would enter the foreign spouse into the family registry of said citizen, making them a citizen as well (or for the Japanese spouse to lose their family registry, and by extension their Japanese citizenship). Yakumo Koizumi, the first-ever naturalised Japanese subject, gained Japanese citizenship in such a manner.

== Acquisition and loss of nationality ==
Any person born in wedlock to at least one Japanese parent is automatically a Japanese national, regardless of the place of birth. Children born in Japan to parents who are stateless or have an unknown status may become Japanese nationals after three years of residence. Adopted children of Japanese nationals have a further reduced residence requirement of one year. Persons born to a Japanese parent and foreign national who are unmarried but acknowledged as their natural children, or such parents who marry after birth, may acquire Japanese nationality by notification to the Minister of Justice.

Foreigners over the age of 18 (or age 20 prior to April 1, 2022) may become Japanese citizens by naturalization after residing in the country for at least five years, renouncing any previous nationalities, and proving self-sufficiency through their occupation or existing financial assets. Applicants should be able to demonstrate elementary knowledge of the Japanese language, though this is not a legal requirement.

Japanese nationals who voluntarily acquire a foreign nationality automatically lose their Japanese nationality. Those who involuntarily hold a foreign nationality are required to choose between their Japanese or foreign status before the age of 22, or within two years of obtaining the other nationality if acquired after age 20. Dual nationals who fail to make this choice within the prescribed time period can be required by the Minister of Justice to provide a declaration of nationality within one month; further failure to state a choice of nationality results in automatic loss of Japanese nationality. Persons who were born in another country, acquired a foreign citizenship at birth, and chose not to retain Japanese nationality are regarded as having lost their Japanese status at the time of birth.

== Controversies ==
In November 2008, Liberal Democratic Party member Tarō Kōno submitted a proposal to allow offspring of mixed-nationality couples in which one parent is Japanese to have more than one nationality. The proposal also calls for foreigners to be allowed to obtain Japanese nationality without losing their original citizenship.

In 2018, a lawsuit was put forward to challenge the ban on Japanese citizens over the age of 21 holding foreign nationalities, but this was later rejected. The plaintiffs expressed a feeling of a loss of identity in their inability to hold onto dual nationalities. The government has argued that allowing dual nationality for adults in Japan could 'cause conflict in the rights and obligations between countries, as well as between the individual and the state'. However, no evidence was offered to substantiate this claim.

Many mixed race Japanese citizens (often called hāfu) also express facing a lost identity when having to choose whether or not they keep their Japanese nationality at age 21. This issue was brought to light when Naomi Osaka chose to surrender her US citizenship because of this law. Despite this, she has subsequently faced criticism as to the validity of her 'Japanese-ness' in her role as torch-bearer in the Tokyo 2020 Olympics. Osaka is not able to speak Japanese fluently and has been living outside Japan for the majority of her life.

== Dual nationality ==
Dual citizenship of Japan and another country is prohibited in some cases due to the provisions for loss of Japanese nationality when a Japanese national naturalizes in another country (see "Loss of citizenship" above), and the requirement to renounce one's existing citizenships when naturalizing in Japan (see "Naturalization" above). There are still some ways in which a person may have dual citizenship of Japan and another country, including:

- They acquire multiple citizenships at birth, such as being born to a non-Japanese citizen parent and acquiring that parent's citizenship as a result of that country's laws or by being born in a jus soli country. However, they must choose one citizenship/nationality before the age of 22 or within two years if the second citizenship is acquired after the age of 20, or they may lose their Japanese nationality (see "Loss of citizenship" above), although this is often circumvented by dual Japanese citizens not using a foreign passport when entering or leaving Japan.
- In practice, dual nationality may also be maintained with states not recognized by Japan such as in the cases of North Korean or Taiwanese dual nationality as the Japanese Ministry of Justice does not recognize either North Korean or Taiwanese citizenships.

== Travel freedom ==
Visa requirements for Japanese citizens

In 2019, Japanese citizens had visa-free or visa on arrival access to 189 countries and territories, ranking the Japanese passport as tied for first (along with Singapore) in the world according to the Henley Passport Index.

In 2017, the Japanese nationality is ranked twenty-ninth in the Nationality Index (QNI). This index differs from the Visa Restrictions Index, which focuses on external factors including travel freedom. The QNI considers, in addition to travel freedom, on internal factors such as peace & stability, economic strength, and human development as well.

== See also ==
- Japanese people
- Foreign-born Japanese
- History of Japanese nationality
- Japanese passport
- Visa policy of Japan
- Visa requirements for Japanese citizens
