= Paulownia crest =

The depiction of the 5-7 paulownia used by the Japanese prime minister, the cabinet, and parts of the Government.

The paulownia crests (桐紋, kirimon) are mon that depict the paulownia. The most notable of the crests is the 5-7 Paulownia (五七桐, Go-shichi (no) Kiri), which is sometimes known in English as the government crest due to its use by the prime minister, the Cabinet, and parts of the executive branch of the Government, and is one of the national emblems of Japan. Paulownia crests come in a number of different designs, and are also sometimes known as the paulownia flower crests (桐花紋, tōkamon).

== History ==
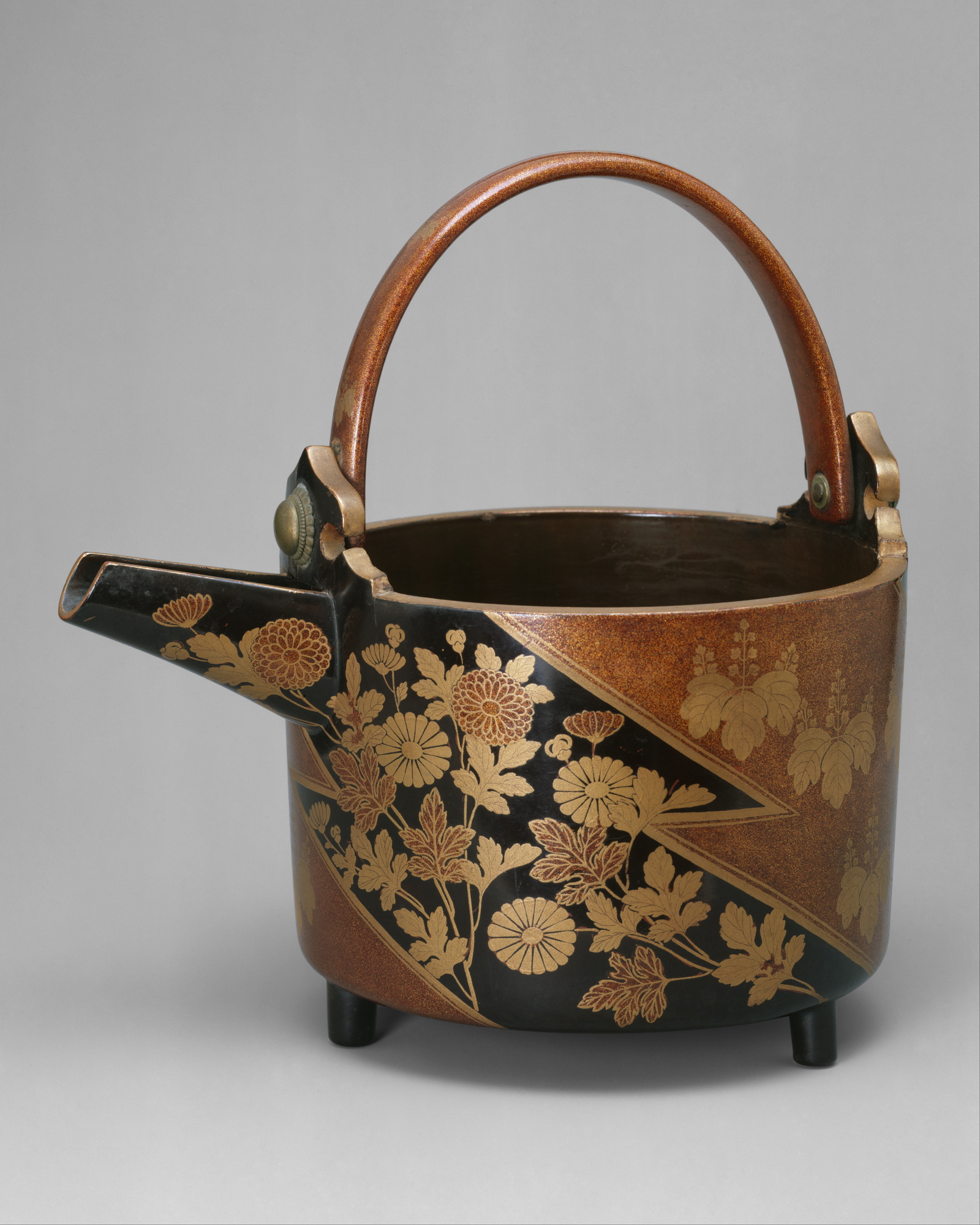
Kōdai-ji Maki-e Sake Ewer with chrysanthemum and paulownia crests in alternating fields, early 17th century, Azuchi–Momoyama period, Metropolitan Museum of Art

Before the chrysanthemum crest was used extensively, the 5-7 paulownia originally was the private symbol of the Japanese Imperial Family, from as early as the sixteenth century. The Toyotomi clan, led by Toyotomi Hideyoshi, later adopted the paulownia for use as the crest of his clan. After the Meiji Restoration, the crest was eventually adopted as the symbol of the Japanese government.

As a result, it is now mainly used by the Japanese government, as a contrast to the chrysanthemum crest which represents the emperor as the symbol of the sovereignty of the State, and members of the Imperial Family.

== Designs ==
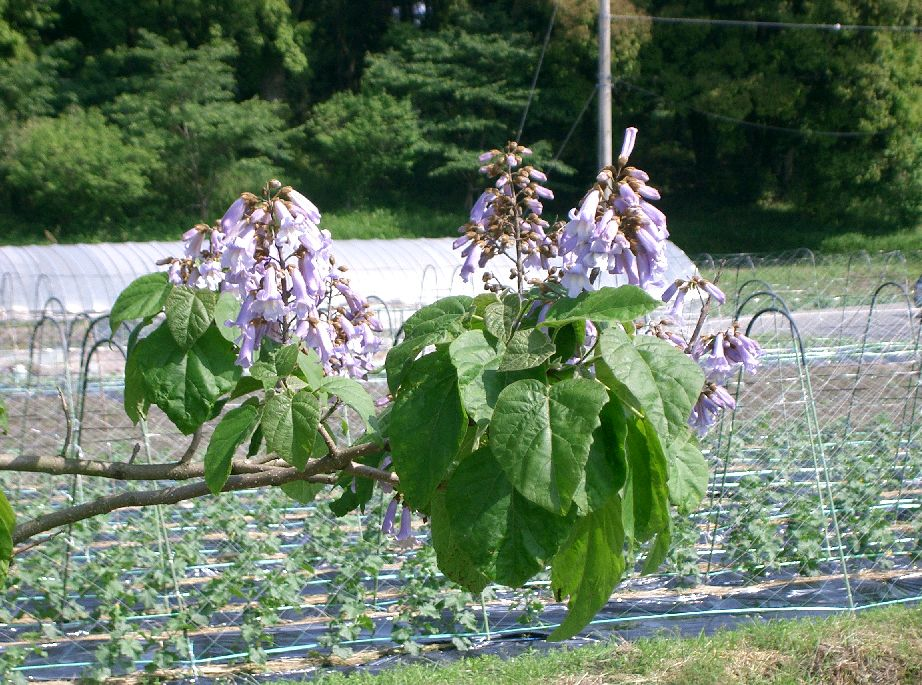
Paulownia leaves and flowers

More than 140 designs exist of the paulownia crests. The most common one is the 5-3 paulownia (五三桐, Go-san no Kiri), consisting of three leaves and an inflorescence of 3-5-3 flowers. It is used by the Ministry of Justice, the Imperial Guard Headquarters, and the University of Tsukuba.

The 5-7 Paulownia and 5-3 Paulownia are also called "Go-shichi Giri" and "Go-san Giri" without the particle "no" respectively, due to consonant mutation ("Kiri" → "Giri") known as rendaku in the Japanese language. The paulownia crests contain the leaves and flowers of Paulownia tomentosa ("princess tree"), which is called "kiri" (桐) or "shirogiri (白桐)" in Japanese.

Design	Image	Name	Japanese	Description
5-3 Paulownia		"Maru ni Go-san no Kiri"	丸に五三桐	According to a study by Japan Kamon Society (ja:日本家紋研究会, Nihon Kamon Kenkyūkai), about 70% of the paulownia crests use this roundel of the 5-3 Paulownia.
5-3 Paulownia		"Go-san Oni Kiri"	五三鬼桐	The 5-3 Paulownia flowers of this design resemble oni's sharp horns.
5-7 Paulownia		"Go-shichi no Kiri"	五七桐	The plain 5-7 Paulownia has been used by those in power and is the official emblem of the Prime Minister, the Cabinet, and the Government today. It resembles a stylized paulownia with 5-7-5 flowers.
5-7 Paulownia		"Taikō Kiri"	太閤桐	Toyotomi Hideyoshi used the 5-3 Paulownia and 5-7 Paulownia crests, and this was one of his official mon. A retired kampaku was called taikō, which commonly referred to him.
Other		"Tosa Kiri"	土佐桐	The Tosa Yamauchi clan used this variant, which came from the crest that Yamauchi Kazutoyo received from Toyotomi Hideyoshi.
Other		"Kiri Agehachō"	桐揚羽蝶	This design shows a swallowtail butterfly mimicking paulownia. It resembles the swallowtail butterfly mon used by the famed Taira clan, which was one of the most important and powerful clans of Japan.

== Gallery ==
This emblem began to be used by the prime minister in 2003, and was inspired by the US presidential seal. It is no longer frequently used, but still appears on some podiums.

The 5-7 paulownia seen on a logo used by the Prime Minister's Office

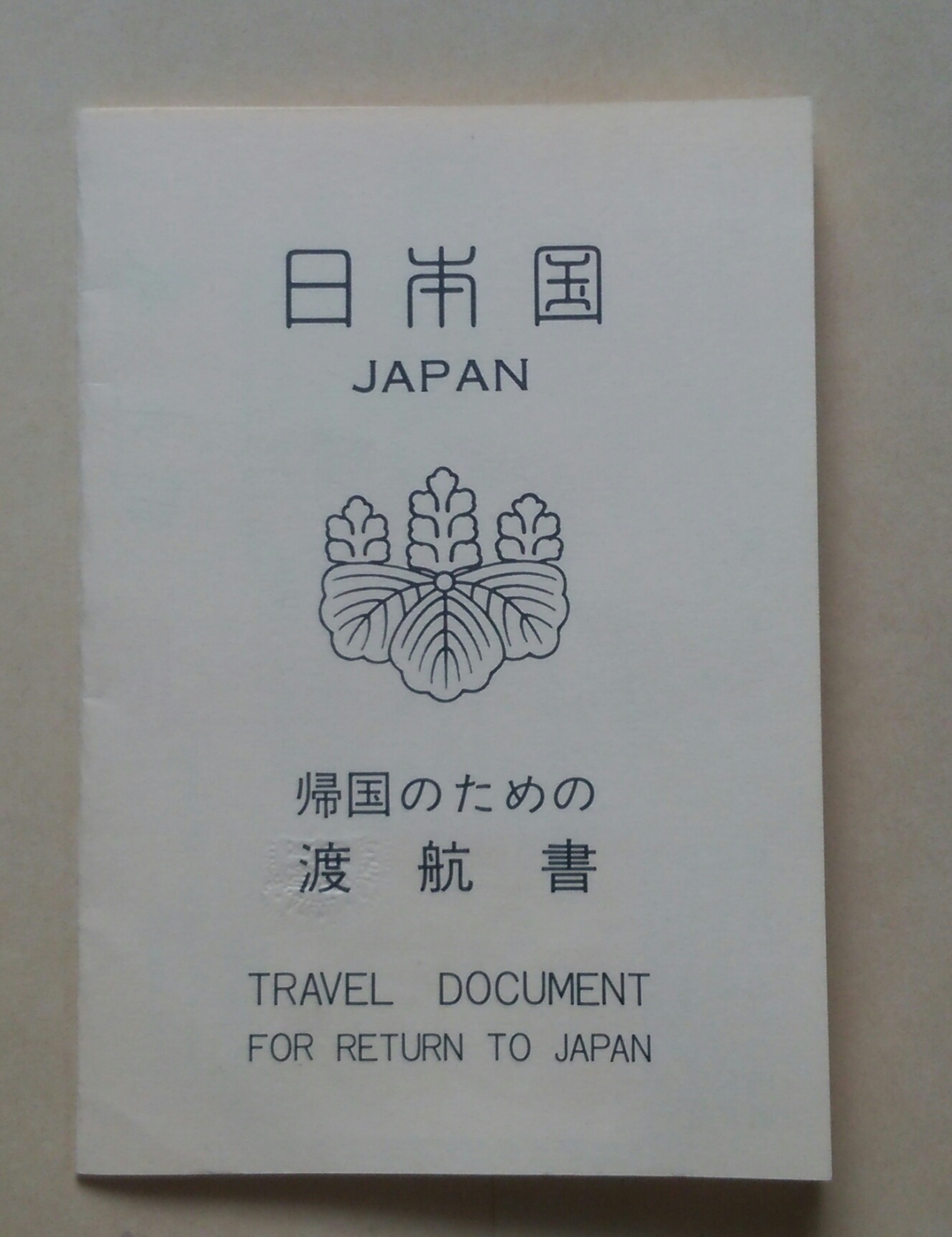
The 5-7 paulownia appears on, among other travel documents, the Travel Document for Return to Japan

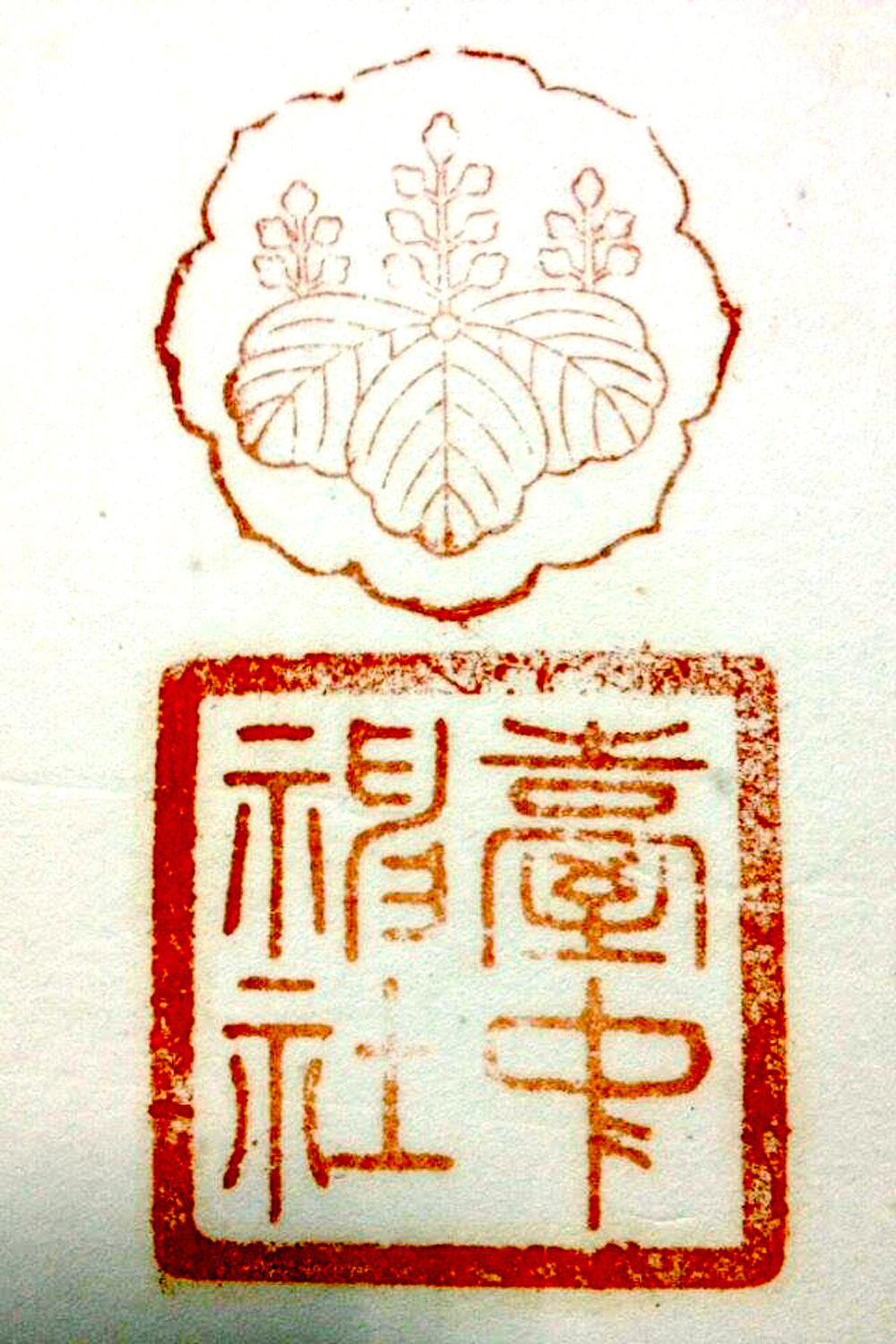
The 5-7 paulownia on a stamp above the seal of the Taichung Martyrs' Shrine

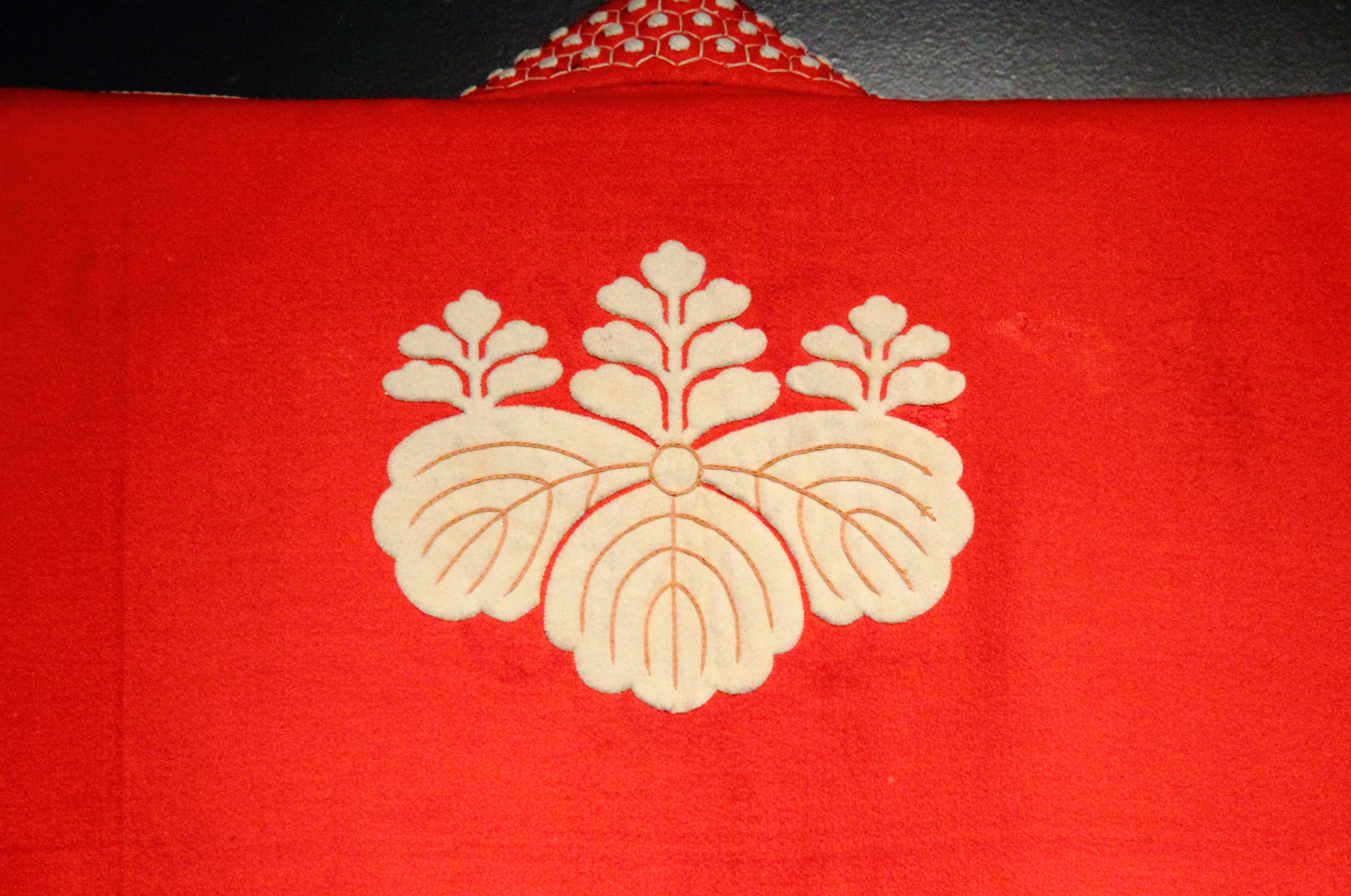
The 5-7 paulownia seen on the clothes of a Samurai

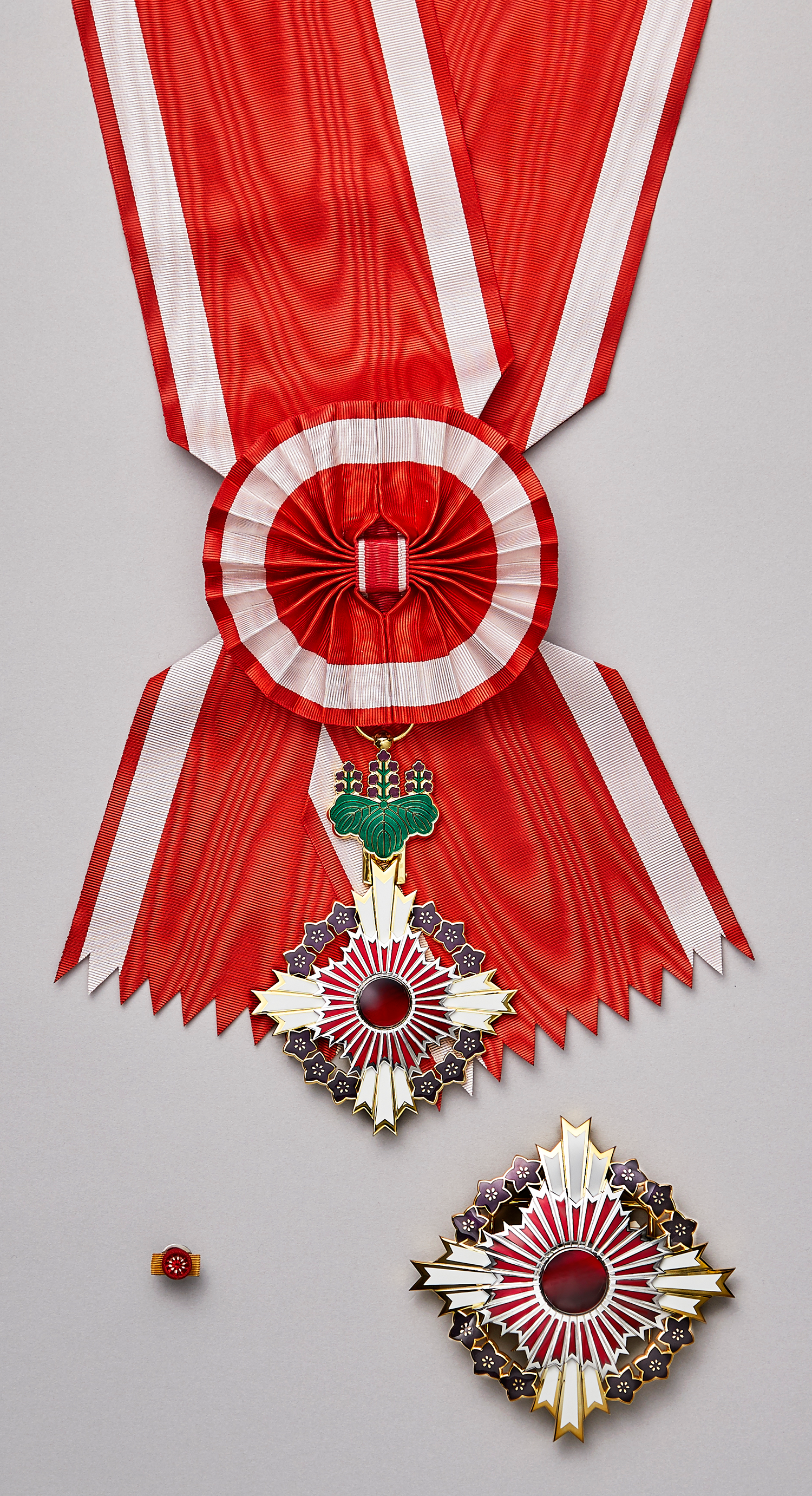
The 5-7 paulownia seen on the insignia of the Order of the Paulownia Flowers

The 5-3 paulownia seen in the logo of the Imperial Guard Headquarters

The 5-3 paulownia seen in the logo used by the University of Tsukuba

== See also ==
- Mon (emblem)
- National emblems of Japan
- Order of the Paulownia Flowers
- Sanmon Gosan no Kiri
