= Japan Re-entry Permit =

Official Japanese travel document

Re-entry Permit to Japan
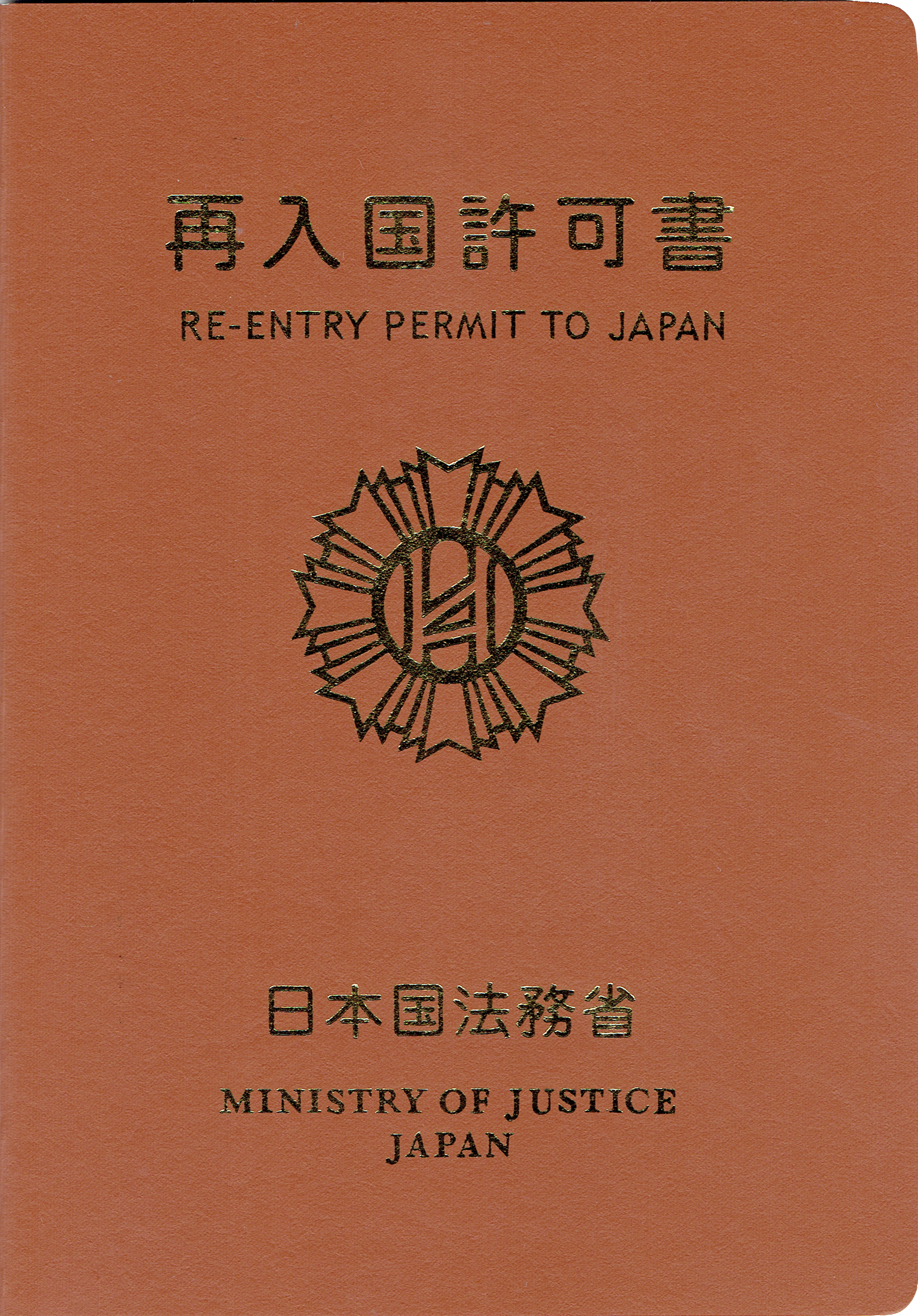
- The front cover of a Japan Re-entry Permit
- Type: Travel Document
- Issued by: Japan
- First issued: 1951
- Purpose: Identification
- Eligibility: Residents in Japan (who are stateless or are unable to obtain a foreign passport)
- Expiration: Same as period of stay or 5 years, whichever is shorter

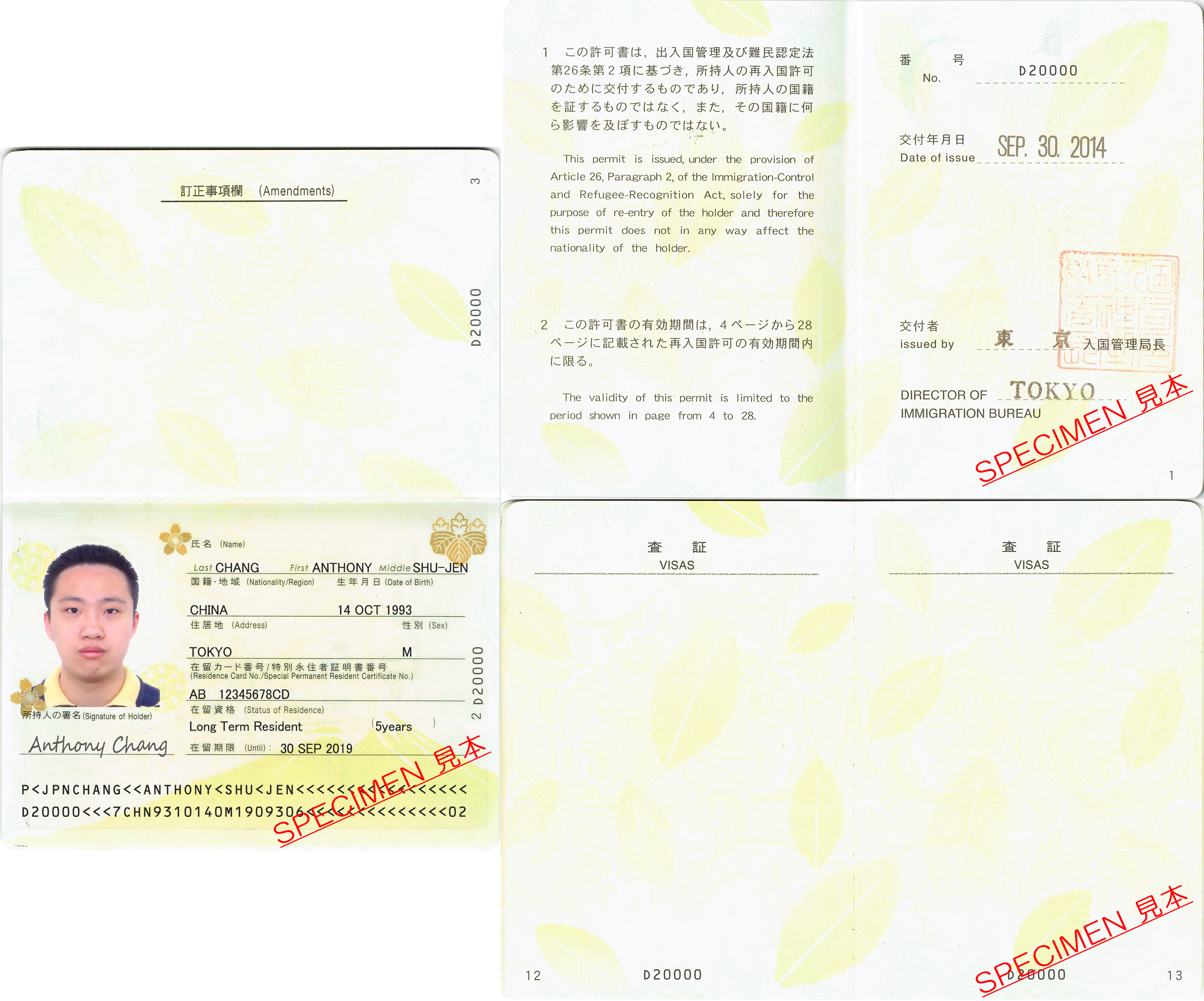
A sample Japan Re-entry Permit bio-data, instruction and visa pages for a Chinese refugee

Old version of Japan Re-entry Permit issued before 2012 with an ARC no. which was abolished. Also some descriptions were printed or written in Japanese only. This version is still valid if the holder keeps extending it.

The Japan Re-entry Permit (再入国許可書; or "Re-entry Permit to Japan") is a travel document similar to a certificate of identity, issued by Japan's Ministry of Justice. It is a passport-like booklet with a light brown cover with the words "再入国許可書 RE-ENTRY PERMIT TO JAPAN" on the front.

== Eligibility ==
The purpose of the re-entry permit is to allow residents to leave and return to Japan, and to serve as an international travel document in lieu of a passport.

The Re-entry Permit can be issued to residents of Japan who are stateless or cannot get a passport from their country, such as de facto refugees holding resident status other than as a 1951 Convention Refugee, including those holding a residence status of student, designated activities, etc. under humanitarian considerations. It is also used by people whose nationality is not recognized in Japan (e.g. North Korean nationals, or Koreans in Japan who retain Joseon nationality but acquired neither South Korea nor North Korea nationality).

== Physical appearance ==
The Re-entry Permit is a passport-like booklet containing 28 pages, including instruction pages, personal information page, and visa pages. The current version's data page is laminated in plastic to prevent tampering.

=== Data pages ===
- Photo of the holder
- Document number
- Name (Last, First, Middle)
- Nationality
- Date of birth
- Sex
- Address (Prefectures of Japan)
- Date of issue
- Residence card no.
- Status and expiry date of residence status
- Issuing authority
- Signature of holder
- Amendments

The validity of this document is limited to the expiry date on the stamps of re-entry permit shown on visa pages of page 4 to 28 and can be extended, while there is no valid date specified on the personal information page.

== Fees ==
The booklet is free of charge.

However, a visa type Re-entry Permit is required in order to validate this document, with a fee of JP¥3000 (Single) or JP¥6000 (Multiple).

== Acceptance ==
=== Acceptance of EU member states ===
As of 2022, EU member states which have explicitly indicated to the Council of the European Union's Visa Working Party that they will accept the Japan Re-entry Permit for visa issuance purposes include the Belgium, Netherlands, Luxembourg, Czech Republic, Germany, Estonia, Lithuania, Hungary, Austria, Portugal and Slovenia based on the notifications from Member States until 15 March 2022; while other countries did not provide any information on their acceptance of it. As of 2013, Spain, France, and Slovakia have explicitly indicated they will not accept it. Said Re-entry Permit is stated as an "Alien's Travel Document".

=== Visa Free Access or Visa on Arrival ===
Since Japan Re-entry Permit is not a regular national passport, most countries and territories require visa prior to arrival.

The following countries and territories provide visa free access or visa on arrival, as they provide everyone such courtesies.

==== Asia ====
| Countries and territories | Entry rights |
|---|---|
| Macau | Visa issued upon arrival for MOP100 |

== Re-entry Permit as a Visa ==
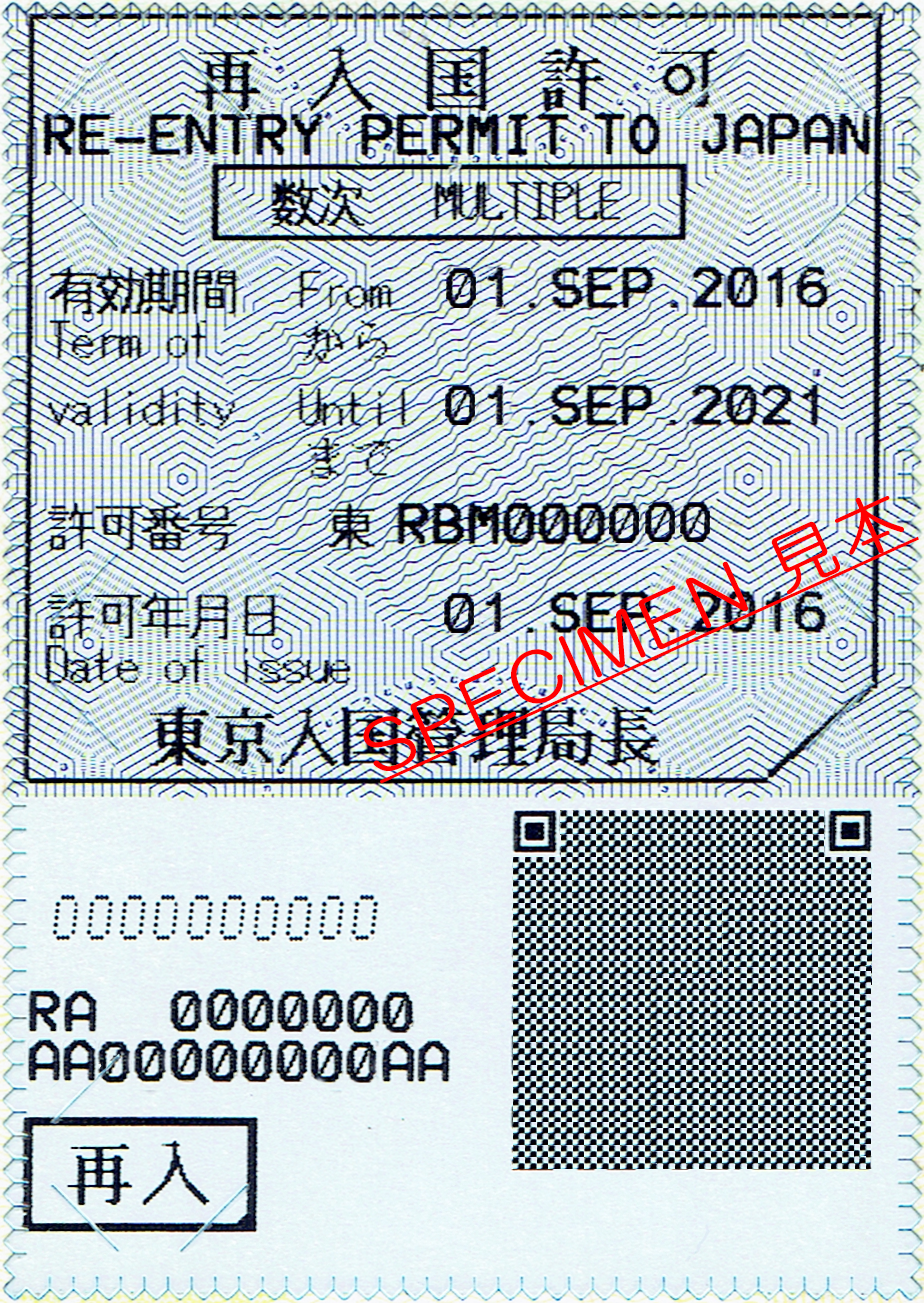
A Re-entry Permit Stamp (sticker type)

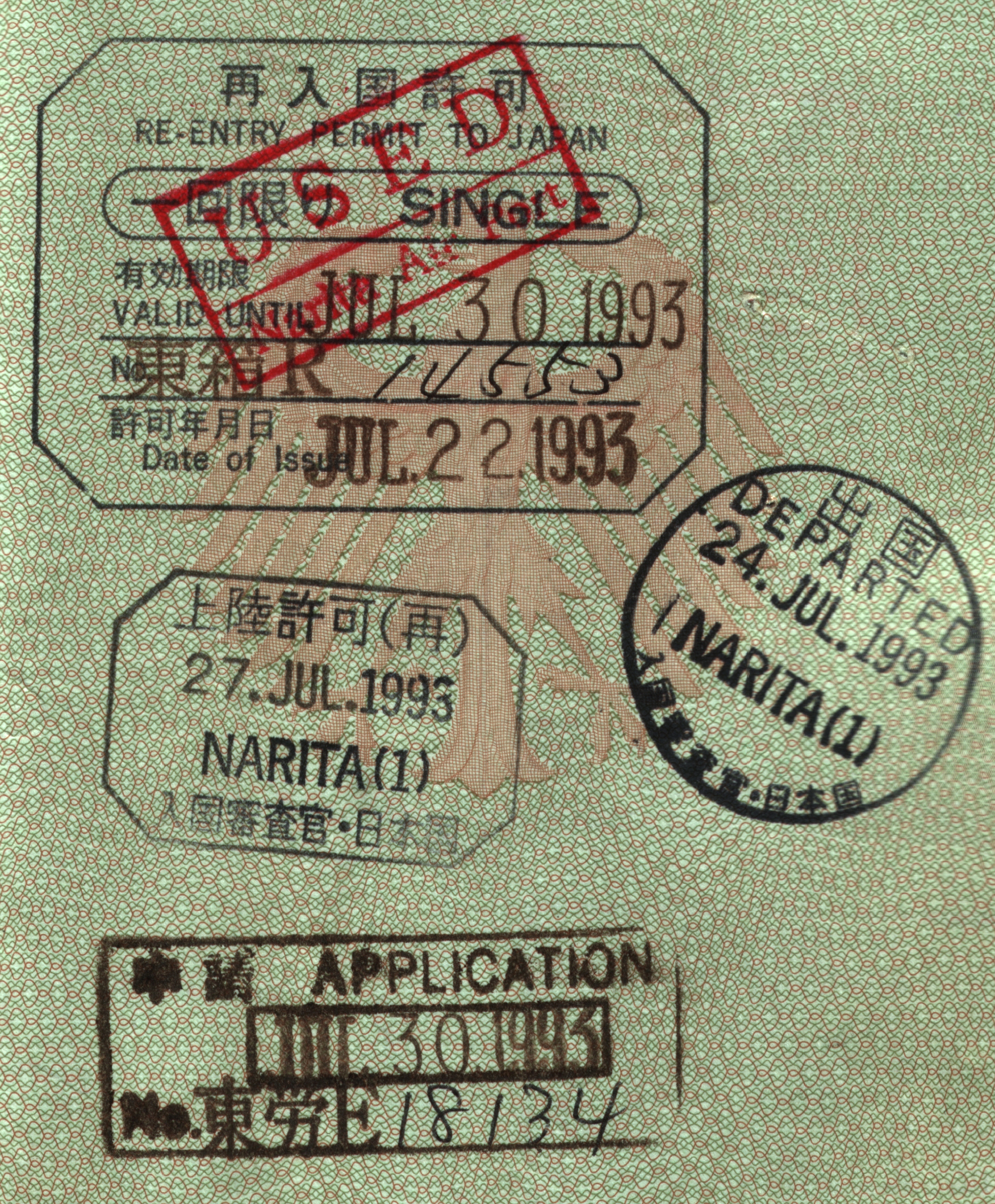
Re-entry Permit Stamp issued 1993

There is also a stamp type re-entry visa calls Re-entry Permit to Japan (再入国許可), which is pasted into a foreign passport or other travel document include this document. This is required for foreign residents who wish to temporarily leave the country.

== See also ==
- Refugee Travel Document
- 1954 Convention Travel Document
- 1954 Convention Relating to the Status of Stateless Persons
- 1961 Convention on the Reduction of Statelessness
- Nansen passport
- U.S. Re-entry Permit
