= Place of birth =

Legal meanings of place of birth concepts

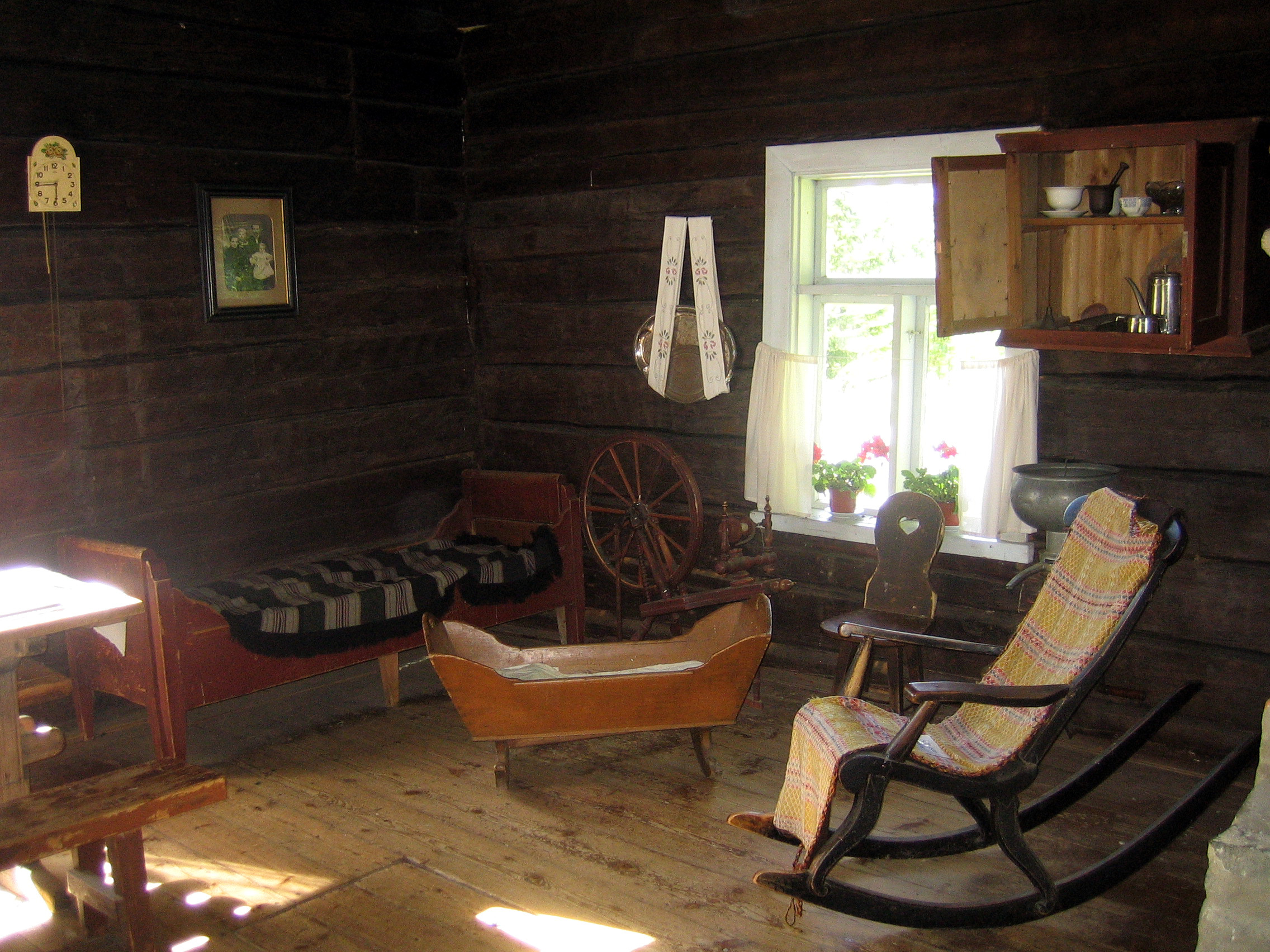
Lepikon torppa in Pielavesi, Finland is known as the birthplace of Urho Kekkonen, the 8th President of Finland.

The place of birth (POB) or birthplace is the place where a person was born. This place is often used in legal documents, together with name and date of birth, to uniquely identify a person. Practice regarding whether this place should be a country, a territory or a city/town/locality differs in different countries, but often city or territory is used for native-born citizen passports and countries for foreign-born ones.

As a general rule with respect to passports, if the place of birth is to be a country, it's determined to be the country that currently has sovereignty over the actual place of birth, regardless of when the birth actually occurred. The place of birth is not necessarily the place where the parents of the new baby live. If the baby is born in a hospital in another place, that place is the place of birth. In many countries, this also means that the government requires that the birth of the new baby is registered in the place of birth.

Some countries place less or no importance on the place of birth, instead using alternative geographical characteristics for the purpose of identity documents. For example, Sweden has used the concept of födelsehemort ("domicile of birth") since 1947. This means that the domicile of the baby's mother is the registered place of birth. The location of the maternity ward or other physical birthplace is considered unimportant.

Similarly, Switzerland uses the concept of place of origin. A child born to Swiss parents is automatically assigned the place of origin of the parent with the same last name, so the child either gets their mother's or father's place of origin. A child born to one Swiss parent and one foreign parent acquires the place of origin of their Swiss parent. In a Swiss passport and identity card, the holder's place of origin is stated, not their place of birth. In Japan, the registered domicile is a similar concept.

In jus soli countries (primarily in the New World), the place of birth automatically determines the nationality of the baby. Almost all countries outside the Americas instead attribute nationality based on the nationality(-ies) of the baby's parents, which is referred to as jus sanguinis.
