= Place of origin =

Municipality in Switzerland from which a Swiss citizen derives their citizenship

In Switzerland, the place of origin (German: Heimatort or Bürgerort, literally "home place" or "citizen place"; French: Lieu d'origine; Italian: Luogo di attinenza, literally "place of relevance") denotes where a Swiss citizen has their municipal citizenship, usually inherited from previous generations. It is not to be confused with the place of birth or place of residence, although two or all three of these locations may be identical depending on the person's circumstances. Citizens of Liechtenstein also have a place of origin (Heimatort).

== Acquisition of municipal citizenship ==
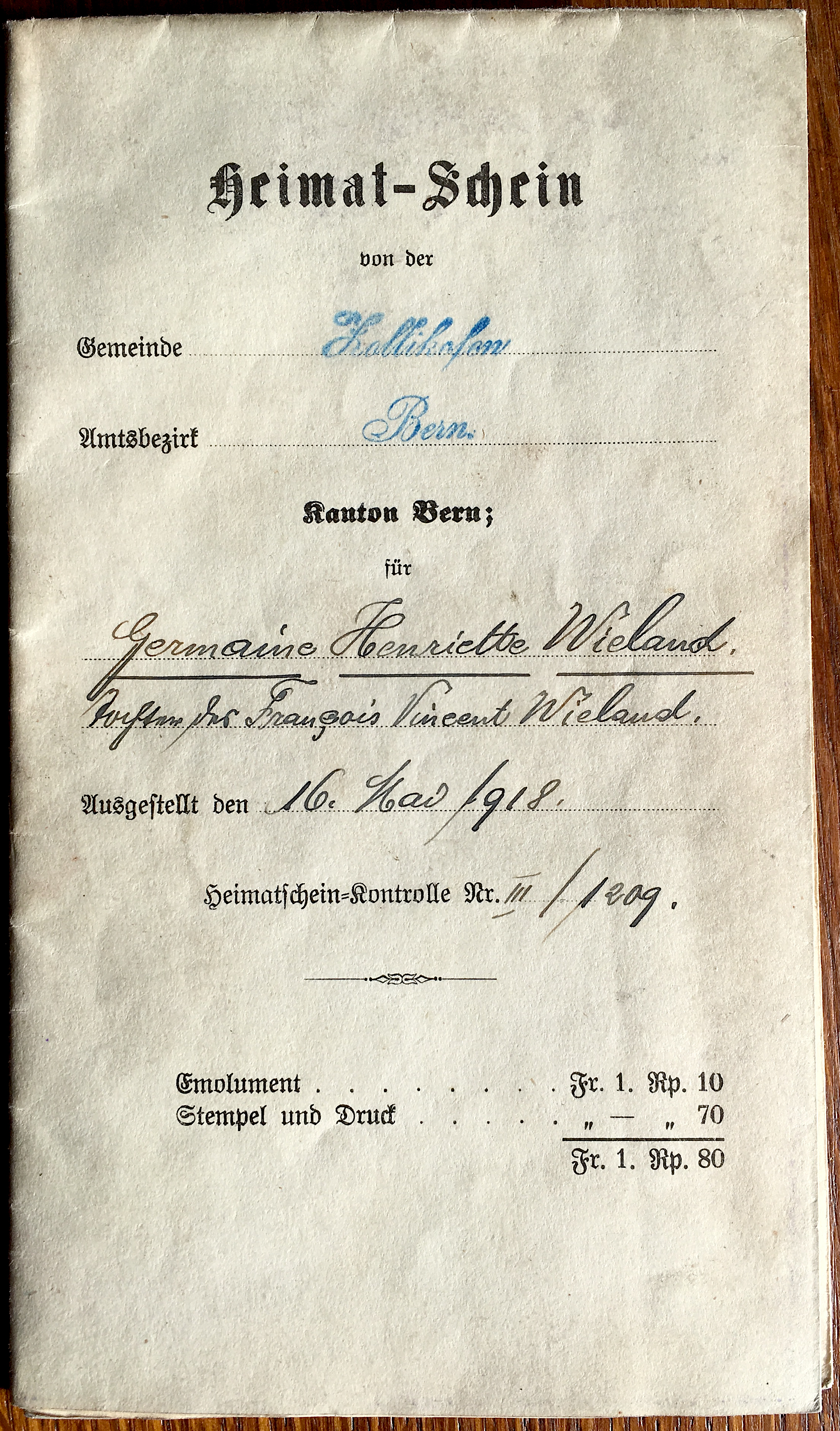
Front of a 1918 Zollikofen (Bern) Heimatschein municipal citizenship certificate.

Swiss citizenship has three tiers. For a person applying to naturalise as a Swiss citizen, these tiers are as follows:

- Municipal citizenship, granted by the place of residence after fulfilling several preconditions, such as sufficient knowledge of the local language, integration into local society, and a minimum number of years lived in said municipality.
- Cantonal (state) citizenship, for which a Swiss municipal citizenship is required. This requires a certain number of years lived in said canton.
- Country citizenship, for which both of the above are required, also requires a certain number of years lived in Switzerland (except for people married to a Swiss citizen, who may obtain simplified naturalisation without having to reside in Switzerland), and involves a criminal background check.

The last two kinds of citizenship are a mere formality, while municipal citizenship is the most significant step in becoming a Swiss citizen.

Nowadays the place of residence determines the municipality where citizenship is acquired, for a new applicant, whereas previously there was a historical reason for preserving the municipal citizenship from earlier generations in the family line, namely to specify which municipality held the responsibility of providing social welfare. The law has now been changed, eliminating this form of allocating responsibility to a municipality other than that of the place of residence. Care needs to be taken when translating the term in Swiss documents which list the historical "Heimatort" instead of the usual place of birth and place of residence.

However, any Swiss citizen can apply for a second, a third or even more municipal citizenships for prestige reasons or to show their connection to the place they currently live – and thus have several places of origin. As the legal significance of the place of origin has waned (see below), Swiss citizens can often apply for municipal citizenship for no more than 100 Swiss francs after having lived in the same municipality for one or two years. In the past, it was common to have to pay between 2,000 and 4,000 Swiss francs as a citizenship fee, because of the financial obligations incumbent on the municipality to grant the citizenship.

A child born to two Swiss parents is automatically granted the citizenship of the parent whose last name they hold, so the child gets either the mother's or the father's place of origin. A child born to one Swiss parent and one foreign parent acquires the citizenship, and thus the place of origin, of the Swiss parent.

== International confusion ==
Almost uniquely in the world (with the exception of Japan, which lists one's Registered Domicile; and Sweden, which lists the mother's place of domicile as place of birth), the Swiss identity card, passport and driving licence do not show the holder's birthplace, but only their place of origin. The vast majority of countries show the holder's actual birthplace on identity documents. This can lead to administrative issues for Swiss citizens abroad when asked to demonstrate their actual place of birth, as no such information exists on any official Swiss identification documents. Only a minority of Swiss citizens have a place of origin identical to their birthplace. More confusion comes into play through the fact that people can have more than one place of origin.

== Significance and history ==
A citizen of a municipality does not enjoy a larger set of rights than a non-citizen of the same municipality. To vote in communal, cantonal or national matters, only the current place of residence matters – or in the case of citizens abroad, the last Swiss place of residence.

Some municipalities have a "Bürgergemeinde", separate from the "Einwohnergemeinde". To vote in the Bürgergemeinde, the citizen typically needs to be both a resident and citizen of the municipality.

The law previously required that a citizen's place of origin continued to bear all their social welfare costs for two years after the citizen moved away. In 2012, the National Council voted by 151 to 9 votes to abolish this law. The place of domicile is now the sole payer of welfare costs.

In 1923, 1937, 1959 and 1967, more cantons signed treaties that assured that the place of domicile had to pay welfare costs instead of the place of origin, reflecting the fact that fewer and fewer people lived in their place of origin (1860: 59%, in 1910: 34%).

In 1681, the Tagsatzung – the then Swiss parliament – decided that beggars should be deported to their place of origin, especially if they were insufficiently cared for by their residential community.

In the 19th century, Swiss municipalities even offered free emigration to the United States if the Swiss citizen agreed to renounce municipal citizenship, and with that the right to receive welfare.

== See also ==
- Ancestral home (Chinese)
- Bon-gwan
- Registered domicile
