= Ancestral home (Chinese) =

Place of origin of one's extended family

- Traditional Chinese: 籍貫
- Simplified Chinese: 籍贯
Transcriptions
Standard Mandarin
- Hanyu Pinyin: jíguàn
Yue: Cantonese
- Yale Romanization: jihkgun
- Jyutping: zik6gun3
Southern Min
- Hokkien POJ: chi̍k‑koàn

Alternative Chinese name
- Chinese: 祖籍
Transcriptions
Standard Mandarin
- Hanyu Pinyin: zǔjí
Yue: Cantonese
- Yale Romanization: jóujihk
- Jyutping: zou2zik6
Southern Min
- Hokkien POJ: chó̍-chi̍k

Second alternative Chinese name
- Chinese: 老家
Transcriptions
Standard Mandarin
- Hanyu Pinyin: lǎojiā
Yue: Cantonese
- Yale Romanization: lóuhgā
- Jyutping: lou5gaa1
Southern Min
- Hokkien POJ: láu-ka

In Chinese culture, an ancestral home is the place of origin of one's extended family. It may or may not be the place where one is born or brought up. For instance, Lien Chan was born in Xi'an, but his ancestral home is Zhangzhou.

== Definition ==
A subjective concept, a person's ancestral home could be the birthplace of any of their patriline ancestors. Su Shi limited it to five generations, i.e. it refers to the home of one's great-great-grandfather. Even more broadly, an ancestral home can refer to the first locality where a surname came to be established or prominent. Commonly, a person usually defines their hometown as what their father considers to be his ancestral home. In practice, most people would define their ancestral homes as the birthplace of their patriline ancestors from the early 20th century, around the time when government authorities began to collect such information from individuals.

Moreover, a person's ancestral home can be defined in any level of locality, from province and county down to town and village, depending on how much an individual knows about their ancestry.

== Implications ==
The Chinese emphasis on a person's ancestral home is a legacy of its history as an agrarian society, where a family would often be tied to its land for generations. In Chinese culture, the importance of family and regional identity are such that a person's ancestral home or birthplace plays an important social role in personal identity. For instance, at a university, students who hail from the same region will often become members of the regional/hometown society or club for other people with the same background. Discussion of personal or ancestral origins is typical when two people meet for the first time. In recent years, the root-seeking (尋根 xúngēn) movement has led to greater interest in ancestral hometowns, especially among overseas Chinese.

Ancestral lineages are an important part of Chinese business culture as it plays a central part of negotiating guanxi. It can also have implications in other areas like politics. See: Shanghainese people in Hong Kong for an example of how ancestry and lineage systems play a part in business practices.

Ancestral home is an item to be filled in many documents in the People's Republic of China, as well as in pre-1997 Hong Kong. Forms that required listing of "ancestral home" (籍貫) included school handbooks to be signed by the parents of schoolchildren.

== Taiwan ==
National ID cards issued in Taiwan by the Republic of China government formerly carried an entry for "home citizenship" (本籍). Citizens would usually have their ancestral home (defined through the patriline) stated on these documents, despite having never set foot in their ancestral home. This practice was abolished by the government in the mid-1990s amid the Taiwan localization movement.

== Singapore ==
Birth Certificates of Singapore issued by the Immigration and Checkpoints Authority carried the entries for "dialect group" (labeled as 籍贯 in Chinese) for newborn's parents.

== See also ==
- Ancestral shrine and ancestor tablets
- Bon-gwan
- Chinese ancestral worship
- Chinese kin
- Family register
- Hukou system
- Place of origin
- Registered domicile
