= Swiss nationality law =

Swiss citizenship

Federal Act on Swiss Citizenship

Federal Assembly of Switzerland
- Citation: SR 141.0
- Territorial extent: Switzerland
- Enacted: 20 June 2014
- Commenced: 1 January 2018

Amends
- Federal Act on the Acquisition and Loss of Swiss Citizenship (1952)
- Status: Amended

The primary law governing nationality of Switzerland is the Federal Act on Swiss Citizenship, which came into force on 1 January 2018. Switzerland is a member state of the European Free Trade Association (EFTA) and the Schengen Area. All Swiss nationals have automatic and permanent permission to live and work in any European Union (EU) or EFTA country.

Swiss nationals are citizens of their municipality of origin, their canton of origin, and the Confederation, in that order: a Swiss citizen is defined as someone who has the citizenship of a Swiss municipality (article 37 of the Swiss Federal Constitution). They are entered in the family register of their place of origin. The manner by which Swiss citizens acquire their place of origin differs depending on whether they acquired Swiss citizenship by filiation (jus sanguinis), ordinary naturalisation, or facilitated naturalisation. Marriage has in and of itself no effect on the places of origin of the spouses.

== Terminology ==
The distinction between the meaning of the terms citizenship and nationality is not always clear in the English language and differs by country. Generally, nationality refers a person's legal belonging to a country and is the common term used in international treaties when referring to members of a state; citizenship refers to the set of rights and duties a person has in that nation.

In German-speaking Switzerland, the term citizenship (German: Bürgerrecht) encompasses a person's affiliation and obligations to the state on three divisional levels: municipal (German: Gemeindebürgerrecht), cantonal (German: Kantonsbürgerrecht), and federal (German: Staatsbürgerrecht). In French-speaking cantons, "nationality" (French: nationalité) is used to describe a person's legal relationship to the federal state while "citizenship" (French: droit de cité) refers to associations on the local and municipal levels.

== Acquisition of Swiss citizenship ==
=== Entitlement by birth, descent, or adoption ===
Children born in Switzerland automatically receive Swiss nationality at birth if at least one married parent is a Swiss national, or they are born to an unmarried Swiss mother. Individuals born overseas to a married Swiss parent or unmarried Swiss mother are also Swiss nationals by descent if their births are registered with the Swiss government and they formally declare intent to retain Swiss nationality before the age of 23. Children of unmarried Swiss fathers must have their paternity established before they may claim Swiss nationality. Children born to two Swiss parents are assigned the municipal and cantonal citizenship of the parent whose surname they acquire.

Adopted children are automatically granted nationality retroactively applied to their birth. Abandoned children found in Switzerland with unclear parentage are assumed to be citizens of the canton they were found in; if their origin is determined before age 18, they automatically lose Swiss nationality unless that loss causes them to be stateless.

=== Naturalisation ===
==== Ordinary naturalisation ====
Ordinary naturalisation in Switzerland is a cantonal competency but regulated by federal legislation. On 20 June 2014, the two Chambers of the Swiss Parliament passed the Total Revision of the Federal Law Concerning the Acquisition and Loss of Swiss Nationality (Révision totale de la loi sur l'acquisition et la perte de la nationalité suisse). The Law, first introduced in 2011 by the Swiss federal government, aimed to lower, among other requirements, the residency requirement from 12 years to 8 years. During the parliamentary debates and the ensuing disagreements between the more conservative National Council (lower house) and the more liberal Council of States (upper house), the residency requirement was decreased to 10 years instead. The time spent in Switzerland between the ages of 8 and 18 is doubled when counted for purposes of applying for naturalisation, however, an applicant must have spent at least 6 years in Switzerland. The law also requires cantons to set a minimum residency requirement of between 2 and 5 years, as well as requiring applicants to have a permanent residency permit (Autorisation d'établissement), which is commonly referred as a C permit. Additionally, time spent in Switzerland with temporary admission (Permis d'admission provisoire) is halved counting the years spent in Switzerland for the purposes of naturalisation. The 2014 Total Revision of the Federal Law Concerning the Acquisition and Loss of Swiss Nationality entered into force on 1 January 2018. Applications for naturalisation submitted prior to the entry into force of the new nationality law will continue to be processed under the 1952 law. The federal nationality law of 2014 imposes two formal conditions which an applicant for naturalisation must satisfy:

- Ten years of lawful residence in Switzerland including three of the five years immediately preceding the application. The time spent in Switzerland between the ages of 8 and 18 is doubled when counted for purposes of applying for naturalisation, however, an applicant must have spent at least six years in Switzerland. An exception is made for registered partners of Swiss citizens where the registered partnership has lasted at least three years and the Swiss citizen was already a Swiss citizen at the moment of the conclusion of the partnership: the foreign registered partner must have lived a total of five years in Switzerland, including the year immediately preceding the application. Absences above 6 months are considered as ending residency.
- Be a permanent resident.

In addition to the aforementioned formal conditions, the federal nationality law of 2014 also imposes material conditions which an applicant for naturalisation must meet:

- The applicant must be well integrated,
- The applicant must be familiar with life in Switzerland,
- The applicant must not endanger Switzerland's interior or exterior security,
- The applicant must show respect for public order and security,
- The applicant must respect the values of the federal constitution,
- The applicant must be able to communicate in a national language, both orally and in writing,
- The applicant must participate in the economy or be in education,
- The applicant must—if married, in a registered partnership, or a parent—encourage and support the integration of their spouse and/or minor children

Cantons can impose further requirements which are complementary to the federal requirements.

Cantonal residence and welfare requirements for ordinary naturalisation
Requirement	Canton																									
Requirement	(Canton of Zurich) ZH	(Canton of Bern) BE	(Canton of Lucerne) LU	(Canton of Uri) UR	(Canton of Schwyz) SZ	(Obwalden) OW	(Nidwalden) NW	(Canton of Glarus) GL	(Canton of Zug) ZG	(Canton of Fribourg) FR	(Canton of Solothurn) SO	(Basel-Stadt) BS	(Basel-Landschaft) BL	(Canton of Schaffhausen) SH	(Appenzell Ausserrhoden) AR	(Appenzell Innerrhoden) AI	(Canton of St. Gallen) SG	(Grisons) GR	(Aargau) AG	(Thurgau) TG	(Ticino) TI	(Vaud) VD	(Valais) VS	(Canton of Neuchâtel) NE	(Canton of Geneva) GE	(Canton of Jura) JU
Residence in canton (years)	2	2	3	5	5	5	5	5	5	3	4	2	5	2	3	5	5	5	5	5	5	2	5	2	2	2
Residence in municipality (years)	2	2	3	5	5	5	5	3	3	3	2	2	5	2	3	2	5	5	3	3	3	2	3	2	2	2
No welfare claimed (years)	3	10	3	3	3	3	5	3	3	3	3	3	5	3	3	3	3	10	10	5	3	3	3	3	3	3
Official source																										

==== Simplified naturalisation ====
Foreigners in the following categories may apply for simplified naturalisation:

- The spouse of a Swiss citizen
- A person who was mistakenly treated as a Swiss citizen and believed themselves to be a Swiss citizen
- Women who lost Swiss citizenship through marriage to a non-Swiss citizen, or through the loss of Swiss citizenship by their husband, before 23 March 1992
- The child of a naturalised person
- Third-generation immigrants: specifically, until 15 February 2023, a person under the age of 40 who is a member of a foreign family that has lived in Switzerland for three generations (on 15 February 2023 the age limit was reduced to 25)
- Children born to Swiss mothers who lost their citizenship due to marriage to a foreigner before 23 March 1992 but who later reacquired their former Swiss nationality
- Children born to Swiss mothers who had acquired Swiss citizenship themselves on the basis of a previous marriage to a Swiss husband
- Persons born before 1 July 1985 whose mothers had acquired Swiss citizenship by descent, adoption, or naturalisation

===== By virtue of marriage =====
A person married to a Swiss citizen may apply for Swiss citizenship by facilitated naturalisation after living in Switzerland for five years and having been married for at least three years. One must also show the following:

- ability to communicate in at least one of Switzerland’s national languages at a spoken B1 level and written A2 level at a minimum, proven with a certificate from an approved language testing organization.
- integration into the Swiss way of life;
- compliance with the Swiss rule of law;
- no danger to Switzerland's internal or external security.

It is also possible for the spouse of a Swiss citizen to apply for facilitated naturalisation while residing overseas after the following:

- six years of marriage to a Swiss citizen.
- close ties to Switzerland, i.e. travelling regularly to Switzerland, being an active member of a Swiss club abroad, and/or having close relations to the family of their Swiss spouse.

Spouses acquiring Swiss citizenship by facilitated naturalisation will acquire the citizenship of their Swiss spouse's place and canton of origin.

===== For third generation immigrants =====
The federal constitution declares that the Confederation will facilitate the naturalisation of third generation immigrants (Art. 38 §3 part a). Legislation has yet to be introduced describing the precise requirements for an application for facilitated naturalisation under article 38 §3 part a.

===== Canton of Vaud =====
The Canton of Vaud legislated in 2004 to allow for second-generation foreigners to acquire Swiss nationality more easily under the following conditions:

- The applicant must meet the requirements set by federal law.
- Aged between 14 and 25 years.
- Has completed at least five years of compulsory education in Switzerland.
- Has at least two years' residence in Vaud.
- Has not lived abroad since the end of their compulsory education, with the exception of temporary stays abroad for purposes of education.
- One of the applicant's parents must currently be lawfully resident in Switzerland or have been so in the past.
- Integration and command of the French language.
- Lawful behaviour.
- The applicant must not represent a danger for Swiss national security.

The 2004 law also facilitates the naturalisation of foreigners of the 3rd generation under the following conditions:

- The applicant must meet the requirements set by federal law.
- At least two years' residence in Vaud.
- The applicant must have not resided outside Switzerland since their birth, with the exception of temporary stays abroad for purposes of education.
- Integration and command of the French language.
- The applicant must not represent a danger for Swiss national security.

==== Demographics ====
The yearly rate of naturalisation has quintupled over the 1990s and 2000s, from roughly 9,000 to 45,000 naturalisations per year.

Relative to the population of resident foreigners, this amounts to an increase from 8% in 1990 to 27% in 2007, or relative to the number of Swiss citizens from 0.16% in 1990 to 0.73% in 2007.

=== Reacquisition of Swiss nationality ===
Foreigners in the following category can apply to have their nationality restored:

- Children whose mothers had acquired Swiss citizenship by virtue of marriage to a Swiss husband (before 31 December 1991).
- Children of Swiss parents born abroad who were not registered at a Swiss representation abroad before their 22nd birthday can reacquire their nationality within a period of ten years immediately following their 22nd birthday.
- Children for whom the ten year limit has expired can nevertheless still apply to recover their former Swiss nationality if they can prove a "close relationship with Switzerland."
- Former Swiss nationals whose Swiss citizenship ceased due to an application for release under articles 37-41 of the nationality law.

Formal conditions:

- Residence in Switzerland or close links to Switzerland if resident abroad.
- The applicant must respect Swiss public order and security.
- The applicant must respect the values of the constitution.
- The applicant must not endanger Switzerland's interior or exterior security.
- Applicants having ceased to be Swiss nationals due to expiry, release, or loss must apply within ten years of ceasing to be Swiss nationals. This rule does not apply to former nationals currently residing in Switzerland for at least three years.

== Loss of Swiss citizenship ==
=== Loss due to cessation of paternity ===
A child whose Swiss citizenship depends on paternal links loses citizenship when those are cut.

=== Loss due to adoption ===
A Swiss child adopted by foreign parents is considered to have lost Swiss citizenship; if the adoption is subsequently annulled, the loss of nationality is retroactively invalidated.

=== Loss due to birth abroad ===
A Swiss citizen born abroad to at least one Swiss parent and holding at least one other nationality loses Swiss citizenship at age 25 if:

- They have never been announced to the Swiss authorities, or
- They have never written to the Swiss authorities expressing their desire to retain Swiss citizenship, or
- They (or their guardians) have never sought to procure Swiss identity documents for them, i.e. a passport or an identity card.

Equally, the child of a person who loses Swiss nationality in this manner also loses Swiss nationality. Exceptionally, a person who has been prevented, against their will, from taking the necessary actions to retain Swiss citizenship may undertake the required actions within a delay of 1 year following the cessation of such hindrances.

== Triple citizenship level within Swiss citizenship ==
Each municipality in Switzerland maintains its own registry of citizens, which is separate from the registry of people living in the municipality. Many Swiss citizens do not live in their place of origin; therefore, they are often required by the municipality in which they live to get a certificate of citizenship (acte d'origine/Heimatschein/atto d'origine) from their place of origin. The constitution forbids discrimination based on one's place of origin.

== Dual nationality ==
According to the Federal Office for Migration, there has been no restriction on multiple citizenship in Switzerland since 1 January 1992. Thus, foreigners who acquire Swiss citizenship and Swiss citizens who voluntarily acquire another citizenship keep their previous citizenship (subject to the laws of the other country). An estimated 60% of Swiss nationals living abroad in 1998 were multiple citizens.

Since many nationality laws now allow both parents to transmit their nationality to their common child (and not only the father, as used to be often the case), many children automatically acquire multiple citizenship at birth. This is especially prevalent in Switzerland, since a relatively high proportion of the population holds a foreign passport (up to 54% in Geneva and 20% nationally). However, the Federal Office for Migration specially notes that this has not resulted in any significant practical problems. Military service, the most likely problem to arise, is usually done in the country where the applicant resides at the time of conscription.

Even though Swiss nationality law permits multiple citizenship, a Swiss national who also holds another country's citizenship may be required to renounce a citizenship, if that foreign country's nationality law forbids such multiple citizenship.

== Political discussions and referendums about Swiss citizenship in Switzerland in recent years ==
Swiss citizenship laws have been widely debated over recent years. In comparison to other nationality laws, access to Swiss citizenship is relatively narrow and restricted, and several modifications to widen access to Swiss citizenship via constitutional initiatives and referendums have been proposed. The referendums on the matter – held in 1983, 1994, and 2004 – were all rejected by Swiss voters. In particular, during the referendum held in September 2004, Swiss voters rejected proposals to give some long-resident Swiss-born persons aged between 14 and 24 the right to apply for facilitated naturalisation (which bypasses cantonal and municipal requirements) and grant automatic Swiss citizenship to persons born in Switzerland with a parent also born in Switzerland.

While minimal requirements for obtaining Swiss citizenship by naturalisation are set at the federal level, Swiss cantons and municipalities are free to introduce more stringent requirements. Some municipalities had previously had no procedure for allowing naturalisations, effectively rendering it impossible, such as in La Chaux in the Canton of Vaud. In 1999, the municipality of Emmen and the canton of Lucerne began using referendums to decide the outcome of naturalisation requests. The practice was ruled unconstitutional by the Supreme Court in July 2003. A referendum directed at legalizing this practice was rejected on 1 June 2008.

== Rights and obligations of Swiss citizens ==
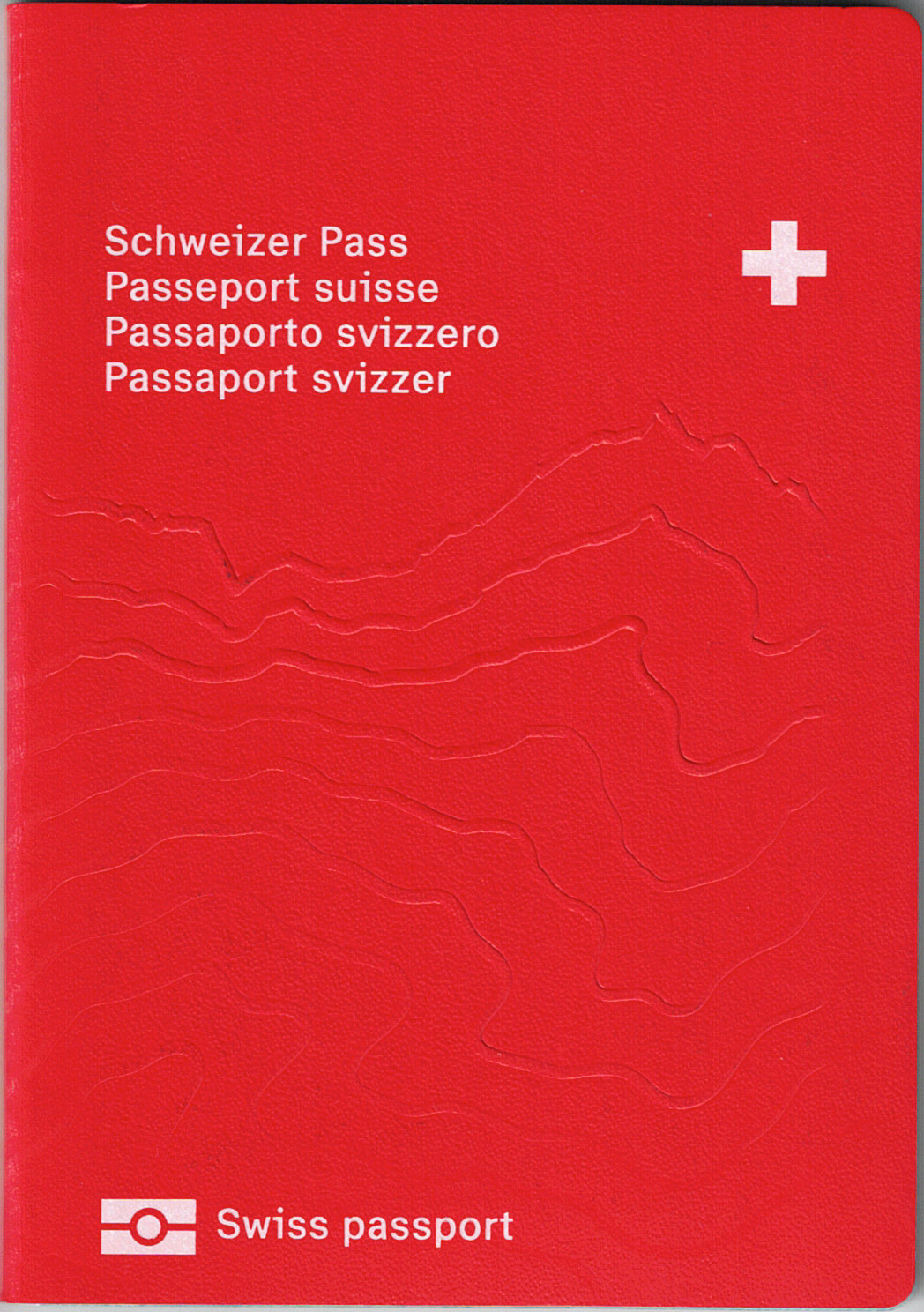
Swiss passport

Swiss citizens are entitled to

- vote in federal elections and referendums upon reaching the age of 18;
- run for federal political office: the Federal Assembly, the Federal Council, and the Federal Court;
- start and sign a popular initiative or a request for a facultative referendum;
- obtain a Swiss passport or a Swiss identity card.
- return to Switzerland at any time;
- avoid deportation from Switzerland;
- be able to live, work, study, buy property, and open up a business anywhere in the EU (through the bilateral agreements between Switzerland and the EU), Iceland, Liechtenstein, and Norway;

Male Swiss citizens, including dual citizens, can be required to perform military service or civilian service (women can do it voluntarily). Male citizens who do not complete their military service or who do not do civilian service must pay a supplementary tax. Swiss citizens are not allowed to work for a foreign (non-Swiss) military, unless they are a citizen of – and are resident in – the country in question. Unmarried Swiss, Catholic males aged 19–30 years old who have completed basic training with the Swiss Armed Forces may join the Swiss Guard of the Vatican State, but the Guard is regarded as a police force, not as an army.

== See also ==
- Visa policy of the Schengen Area
- Visa requirements for Swiss citizens
