= Koseki =

Japanese family register

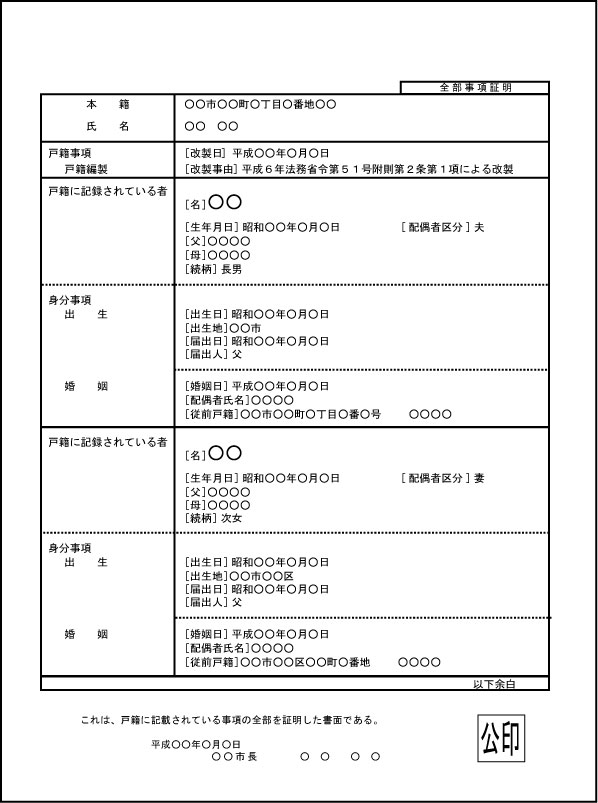
Reproduction of a koseki certificate printout in the pre-2025 format, before name readings were recorded.

A koseki (Japanese: 戸籍) or family register is Japan's official system for recording and certifying Japanese nationality and family relationships. It records births, parentage, adoptions, marriages, divorces and deaths, and is maintained by the municipality of the registered domicile (honseki). The modern nationwide system dates from 1872 and organizes civil-status information around family registers rather than primarily around individuals.

Japanese nationals are entered in a koseki, and changes in civil status are reported to municipal authorities and recorded in it. Marriage, consensual divorce, acknowledgement of paternity, and adoption generally take legal effect through notification, while births and deaths must be reported after they occur. By linking successive registers and associated records, the system provides long-term legal continuity and allows family relationships, changes in civil status, and residence history to be traced across generations and, in principle, for well over a century.

Koseki registration is distinct from resident registration. Japanese nationals and foreign residents register their actual residence through the jūminhyō (住民票) system. Foreign nationals cannot be members of a koseki, although they may be recorded in one as, for example, the spouse or parent of a Japanese national. Members of the Imperial Family are recorded separately in the Register of Imperial Lineage.

== History ==
Japan has a long history of household registration. Nationwide registers known as the Kōgo no nenjaku (庚午年籍) and Kōin no nenjaku (庚寅年籍) were compiled in 670 and 690 under the developing ritsuryō system. During the Edo period, population records included the shūmon jinbetsu aratamechō (宗門人別改帳), which combined household registration with records of religious affiliation.

The direct predecessor of the modern koseki was established by the Family Registration Law of 1871, which took effect in 1872 and created a unified nationwide registration system based initially on actual residence. Under legislation introduced in 1898, the koseki was instead organized around the legally defined ie, while the registered domicile (honseki) became distinct from actual residence.

Following the postwar abolition of the ie system, the current Family Register Act was enacted in 1947 and took effect in 1948. Registers came to be organized principally around a married couple and their children, rather than a household head and the extended family.

Computerized processing of koseki was authorized in 1994 and subsequently adopted by all municipalities.

A law enacted in 2003 and taking effect in July 2004 established a procedure by which persons meeting statutory requirements may obtain a family-court order changing their legal sex, with the change subsequently reflected in the koseki.

Reforms effective in 2024 introduced nationwide information sharing and allowed certain koseki certificates to be obtained from municipalities other than the registered domicile. The system has since been extended to electronic koseki certificates exchanged between public authorities, allowing paper certificates to be omitted in supported administrative procedures.

Only government officials can access this database.

== Format ==
There are two main types of certified copies of a koseki: the comprehensive copy (戸籍謄本, koseki tōhon) and the selected copy (戸籍抄本, koseki shōhon). The comprehensive copy contains the records of all members of the koseki, while the selected copy contains the record of an individual member.

A typical koseki has one page for the parents and their first two children, with additional children recorded on additional pages.

The following information is recorded in a koseki under articles 9 and 13 of the Family Register Act (戸籍法, Koseki-hō):

- (header) registered domicile (honseki)
- (header) family name and given name of the "head of the koseki", i.e. the first person listed in the koseki; the family name is shared by all members of that koseki
- (header) reading of the family name
- given name
- reading of the given name
- date of birth
- cause and date of entry into the koseki
- names of natural parents or, in the case of plenary adoption, the names of the adoptive parents
- in the case of non-plenary adoption, the names of the adoptive father and/or mother
- if married, whether the person is the husband or wife
- if transferred from another koseki, identifying information from the former koseki
- other matters specified by ordinance.

When an individual is transferred from one koseki to another, some information recorded in the former koseki is carried over to the new one, while other information is not. Information concerning birth, a continuing marriage, and loss of foreign nationality, for example, is carried over. Conversely, information concerning a previous divorce or the acquisition of Japanese nationality through naturalization is not normally carried over. When all persons recorded in a koseki have been removed, it becomes a removed family register (joseki); certified copies of the former register remain obtainable.

The readings of the family name and each member's given name are recorded in katakana. This requirement took effect on May 26, 2025. For persons already recorded in a koseki at that time, municipalities notified them of the readings intended for registration; where no reading was reported during the one-year notification period, the notified reading is entered by the municipality after May 26, 2026. However, this database is strictly for use by local government staff; it cannot be accessed by others, such as private investigators or businesses that specialize in locating individuals.

== Imperial family ==
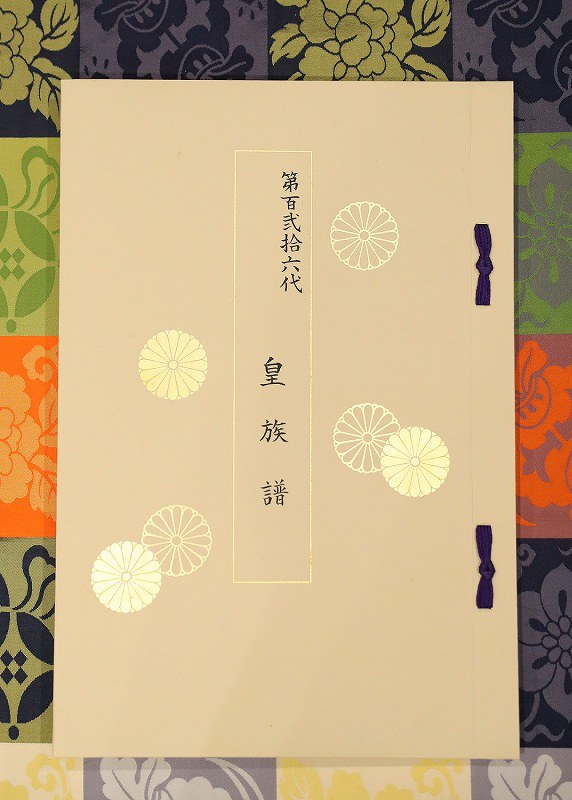
Cover of the Register of Imperial Lineage (Kōtōfu) covering the current imperial reign (126th emperor)

Members of the Imperial Household of Japan are not registered in a koseki; instead, they are registered in the Register of Imperial Lineage (皇統譜, Kōtōfu), pursuant to Article 26 of the Imperial House Law. The Register of Imperial Lineage consists of the Taitōfu, which records matters relating to the Emperor and the Empress, and the Kōzokufu, which records matters relating to other members of the Imperial Household.

== Citizenship ==
Only Japanese nationals are members of a koseki, which serves as the official means of certifying Japanese nationality and family relationships. A certified copy of the koseki is normally required for a new Japanese passport application; for online applications, however, the necessary koseki information may be transmitted electronically, allowing submission of the paper copy to be omitted.

A person who acquires Japanese nationality through naturalization must notify the authorities within one month of publication of the naturalization in the Official Gazette, resulting in the creation of a new koseki or, where applicable, entry into a Japanese spouse's existing koseki. If a Japanese national subsequently loses a foreign nationality, that loss must also be reported within one month of becoming known.

Foreign nationals cannot themselves be members of a Japanese koseki, but may be recorded in one in connection with a Japanese national, for example as a spouse or parent. In an international marriage, the foreign spouse's name, date of birth, nationality and the fact of the marriage are recorded in the Japanese spouse's koseki.

== Address history and domicile transfers ==
The koseki system is distinct from the resident registration system. Japanese citizens and foreign residents are required by law to register their place of residence with the municipality in which they live, whereas a koseki is maintained only for Japanese nationals. For Japanese nationals, the two systems are linked, but they record different concepts: resident registration records a person's actual place of residence, while the honseki is the registered location of the person's koseki and does not necessarily correspond to where that person lives.

When a Japanese national changes residence, the municipality of residence reports the new address to the honseki-chi (本籍地), the municipality in which the person's honseki is located and which administers that koseki. The new address is recorded in a supplementary record known as the koseki no fuhyō (戸籍の附票), which records the person's successive addresses while he or she is entered in that koseki. For a person who moves abroad after filing an overseas moving-out notification, the fuhyō records that the person has moved abroad and the planned date of departure rather than the person's foreign address.

The registered domicile (honseki) of a koseki may be transferred to another location, independently of the actual residence of the persons listed in it. The new registered domicile may be established at any valid location within Japanese territory. If the transfer is within the same municipality, the existing koseki and fuhyō are simply amended. If it is to another municipality, a new koseki and fuhyō are established by the new honseki-chi, while the former records remain with the previous honseki-chi. The new koseki records the registered domicile of the preceding koseki, allowing earlier records—and thus earlier address history in the former fuhyō—to be traced.

When a koseki is removed from the active register, such as when all persons recorded in it have been removed or when it is transferred to another municipality, it is preserved as a removed family register (joseki). Removed family-register books are retained for 150 years from the year following the relevant year. The corresponding fuhyō is likewise retained for 150 years after it is closed.

== Continuity and traceability ==
A distinctive feature of the koseki system is the continuity of its records across a person's lifetime and between generations. Successive koseki and joseki can be linked through information identifying the preceding register, allowing parentage, marriage, adoption, changes in civil status and other family relationships to be reconstructed over long periods. The Fukushima Legal Affairs Bureau describes the ability to trace an individual from birth to death and then continuously through parents and grandparents as a characteristic with few parallels internationally, and characterizes the system as highly reliable. Legal scholar Noriko Mizuno has similarly contrasted the Japanese system with civil-registration systems based primarily on separate individual certificates, noting the unusually extensive evidentiary functions of the koseki.

This continuity has practical importance particularly in inheritance, where family relationships extending over several generations may have to be established. Removed and superseded registers are retained for 150 years; the Ministry of Justice has explained that this period was chosen in part so that records reaching the grandparents' generation would remain available for determining family and inheritance relationships. Together with associated koseki records, including the fuhyō, the system can also preserve a long-term history of residence.

== Privacy concerns and other criticisms ==
Because koseki records contain detailed information on family relationships and personal status, they have historically been used in background investigations that could facilitate discrimination, particularly against burakumin and persons born outside marriage. Postwar reforms progressively restricted access to and disclosure of such information. In 1974, the Ministry of Health and Welfare reportedly prohibited employers from requiring prospective employees to present their family register. From 1975, historical status designations (族称), such as kazoku, shizoku, and heimin (commoner), and certain other sensitive entries in older registers were obscured.

In 1976, general inspection of koseki and joseki was abolished. Copies of a current koseki could still in principle be requested by anyone, but most third-party requests required a stated reason and could be refused if clearly made for an improper purpose. Stricter rules took effect on May 1, 2008. A person recorded in a koseki, including one subsequently removed from it, may obtain a certified copy, as may that person's spouse, lineal ascendants, and lineal descendants. Third parties must demonstrate a legally recognized need or other legitimate reason; certain licensed professionals, including lawyers, may request copies when necessary for an entrusted case or matter. Copies may be requested in person or by mail.

For marriages between Japanese nationals, the spouses must choose either the husband's or the wife's family name. In 2024, the husband's name was chosen in 94.1% of marriages. The Supreme Court upheld the constitutionality of this requirement in 2015 and again in 2021, while stating that whether the system should be changed was a matter for the legislature.

Children are normally entered in a koseki following notification of their birth. In some cases, however, no birth notification is made and the child remains without a koseki record (無戸籍, mukoseki). This has occurred, among other reasons, in cases involving the legal presumption of paternity. As of March 10, 2025, the Ministry of Justice had identified about 700 people whose mukoseki status remained unresolved, equivalent to roughly 0.0006% of Japan's Japanese-national population at the time.

In 2010, a nationwide review found that 234,354 persons born before 1910 remained recorded in koseki without having been removed, although their whereabouts could not be confirmed. Many were presumed to have died long before without their deaths having been recorded. The findings attracted attention amid separate cases involving pension fraud, but these obsolete entries did not significantly affect Japan's official population or life-expectancy statistics.

The koseki system is also the subject of political and ideological debate. Criticism of its family-based structure has been particularly associated with liberal and left-wing lawyers, activists, scholars, and political movements, including feminist groups, which have linked it to the legacy of the prewar ie system and argued that its framework can disadvantage people whose circumstances fall outside conventional family structures. Conservative politicians and organizations have generally placed greater emphasis on preserving the system and on family unity and continuity.

== Family registries in other countries ==
Japan's koseki and China's hukou developed from the broader East Asian tradition of household registration, but today perform substantially different functions. The Japanese koseki (戸籍; Chinese: 户籍, hùjí) is principally a civil-status and kinship register: it records Japanese nationals and certifies nationality and family relationships from birth to death. Actual residence is registered separately through the jūminhyō system.

By contrast, China's hukou (户口) is principally a household and residence-registration system. Chinese citizens are registered by household and place of permanent residence, and changes of residence may require transfer of the registration. Historically, local hukou status also played an important role in regulating internal migration and access to education, health care, housing and other public services. Successive reforms have reduced these distinctions; in 2026 the Chinese government announced further measures to provide basic public services according to actual residence rather than local hukou status.

Related systems of household and family registration are also found in Taiwan. In South Korea, the former family-register and hoju system was replaced in 2008 by an individual-based Family Relations Registration System.

== See also ==
- Hukou — household registration in China
- Household registration in Taiwan
- Family register
- Jūminhyō — resident registration in Japan
- Birth certificates in Japan
