= Registered domicile =

Japanese document field

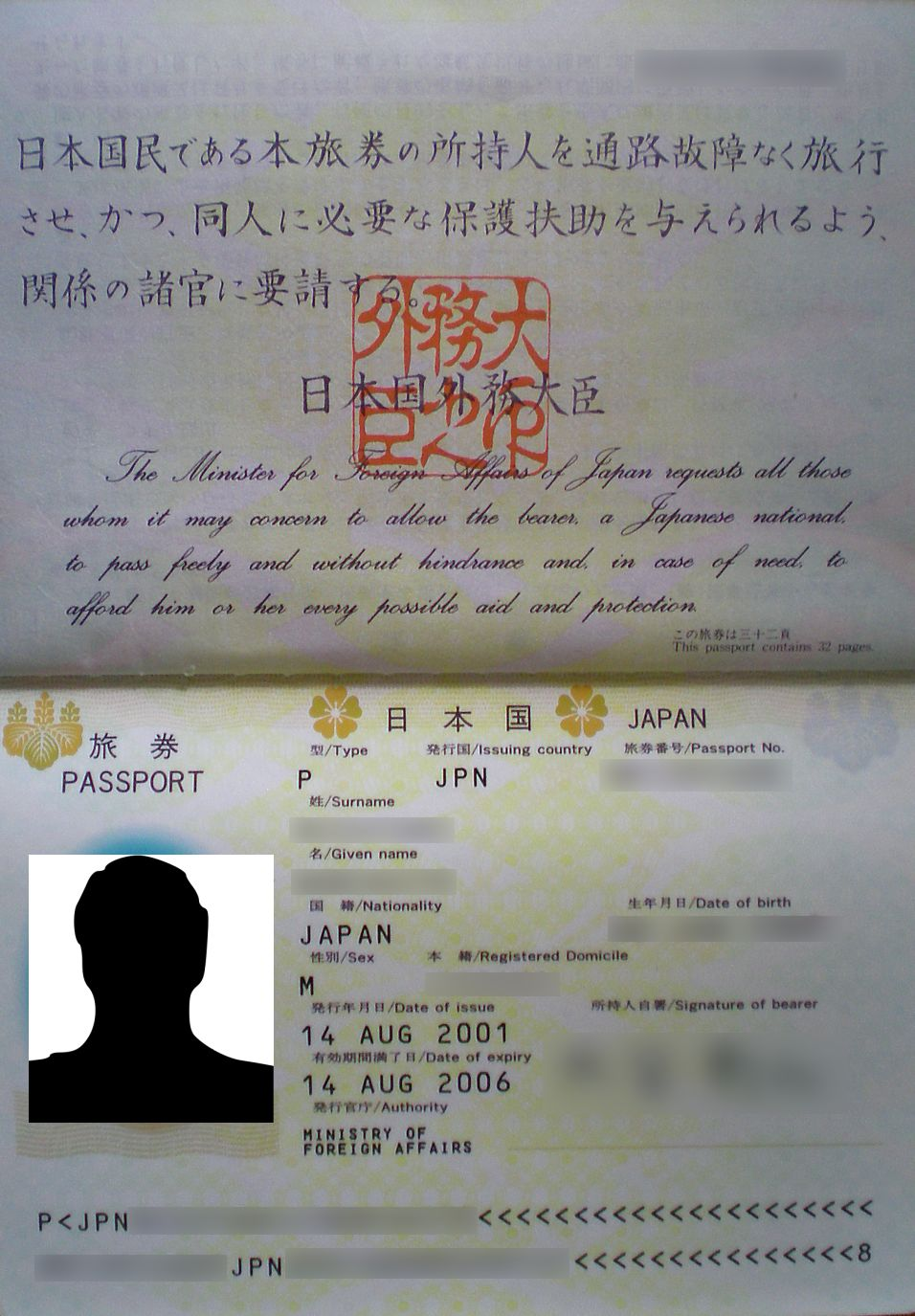
'A Japanese passport, displaying a 'registered domicile' field in lieu of 'place of birth'.

In Japan, a registered domicile (本籍, honseki) is the place where a Japanese citizen is considered to have their roots. It determines the city/ward/town office where their koseki is kept.

== Features ==
A registered domicile is not necessarily the same as a Japanese citizen's place of birth or current residence (despite the name). It is printed on a person's koseki and passport, and is listed (albeit on the prefecture level only) on the latter in lieu of someone's place of birth.

A registered domicile can be any address within the boundaries of Japan which possesses an official postal address and postcode. This has led to people registering their domiciles at addresses such as the Tokyo Imperial Palace (~2000 registrations) and Okinotorishima (~200 registrations). There are exceptions to this rule: places which do not fall within a prefecture's boundaries, areas not belonging to a city/town/village, and the Kuril Islands.

Naturalised Japanese (unless coming from a background like Zainichi Korean) often do not have ancestral origins or ties to a specific place in Japan; choosing a registered domicile from scratch is therefore part of the naturalisation process.

== Academic analysis ==
Karl Jakob Krogness (2014) notes in Jus Koseki that, per Chikako Kashiwazaki (1998)'s exploration of the Japanese nationality system that it includes elements of jus domicilis (law of domicile). One who has a registered domicile in Japan is therefore Japanese because they possess such a domicile, and therefrom deriving a koseki.

== See also ==
- Ancestral home (Chinese)
- Place of origin
