= Swiss passport =

Passport of the Swiss Confederation issued to Swiss citizens

Swiss passport; Schweizer Pass Passeport suisse Passaporto svizzero Passaport svizzer
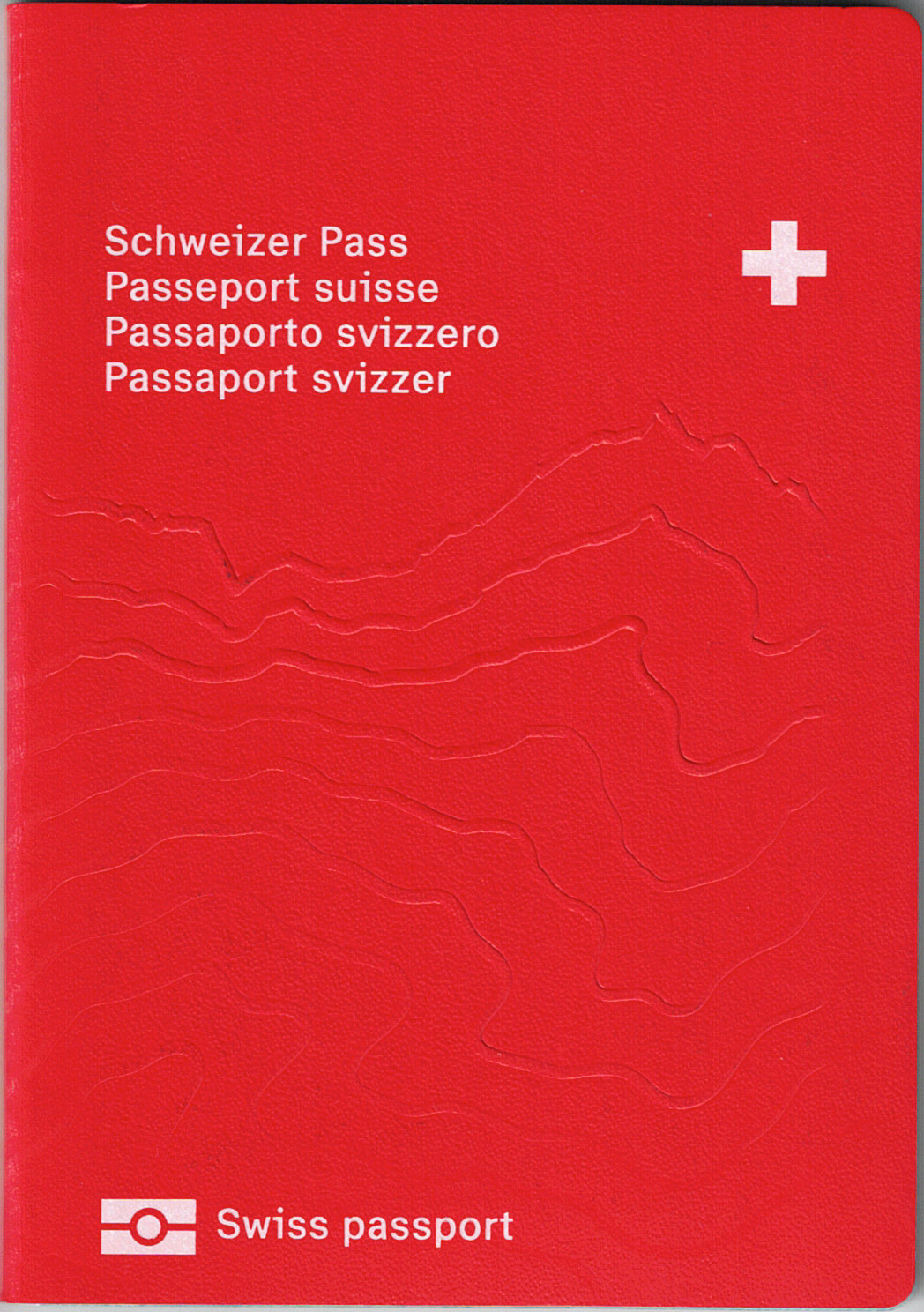
- The front cover of a contemporary Swiss biometric passport from 2022
- Type: Passport
- Issued by: Cantonal passport offices (in Switzerland); Federal Department of Foreign Affairs (abroad)
- First issued: 1490 (first version); 10 December 1915 (booklet); 1 January 2003 (machine-readable passport); 4 September 2006 (biometric passport); 31 October 2022 (current version)
- Purpose: Identification
- Eligibility: Swiss citizenship or special cases
- Expiration: 10 years for adults, 5 years for minors up to age 17
- Cost: CHF 140 (adult) / CHF 60 (minor)

The Swiss passport (Note: German: Schweizer Pass; French: passeport suisse; Italian: passaporto svizzero; Romansh: passaport svizzer) is a biometric identity document issued by the Swiss Confederation. It can be ordinary or provisional, or in special cases, diplomatic or service-related.

There is also a green Swiss passport for foreigners, issued in specific cases of necessity (foreigners without documents from their country and at the same time holders of a residence permit, stateless persons, asylum seekers, and others).

The passport, along with the Swiss identity card allows for freedom of movement in any of the states of EFTA and the EU. This is because Switzerland is a member state of EFTA, and through bilateral agreements with the EU.

== History of Swiss passports ==
The first passports to be issued in what is now Switzerland were issued in 1490, for citizens of the canton of Schwyz. The first Swiss passport booklets were issued on 10 December 1915. The characteristic red Swiss passport was created in 1959. Until 1985 the Swiss passport included only the national languages of the time (French, German, and Italian) as well as English. Romansh was added in the later Pass 85 after it was declared the fourth Swiss national language following a referendum. The order of the languages was then changed to German, French, Italian, Romansh, and English.

=== Structure of the Swiss passport ===
Later Swiss passports (Pass 03, 06, 10 and 22) contain 40 pages (instead of the previous 32) and a data page. 36 pages are provided for foreign visas and official stamps. The first page contains the bearer signature, as well as field 11 "Official observations". The pages 2–3 contain translations of the field labels of the data page in 13 (Pass 03) and 26 (Pass 06, 10 and 22) languages, respectively. Each page has a unique color pattern, as well as an incomplete Swiss cross which registers with the matching incomplete cross on the reverse side when held to light. On pages 8–33, the incomplete Swiss cross contains the microprinted name of a canton and the year it joined the Swiss Confederation, with the canton's coat of arms and a famous landmark in the top outer corner.

== Biometric passports ==
Since 15 February 2010, non-biometric passports (Pass 03, 06 and 85) are no longer issued.

From 1 March 2010 and according to the Schengen Agreement, Swiss passports are all biometric. This is required for visa-free travel to the United States.

A new series of passport designs with increased security features was made available on 31 October 2022.

=== Data page ===
The Swiss passport includes the following fields on the polycarbonate data page

- Photo of the passport bearer (also microperforated in the polycarbonate card)
- Type (PA - without biometrics, PM - with biometrics, PD - temporary passport, PB - diplomatic passport)
- Code (CHE)
- Passport number
- 1 Surname
- 2 Given name(s)
- 3 Nationality
- 4 Date of birth (dd.mm.yyyy)
- 5 Sex (M/F)
- 6 Height (cm)
- 7 Place of origin: (municipality and canton) (NB: birthplace is not indicated in Swiss identity documents)
- 8 Date of issue
- 9 Authority
- 10 Date of expiry

The bottom of the data page is the machine-readable zone.

=== Names with diacritics ===
Names containing diacritics (ä, ö, ü, à, ç, é, è, etc.; the letter ß is not normally used in Swiss Standard German but is supported in the passport if required) are spelled with diacritics outside the machine-readable zone, but in the machine-readable zone, German umlauts (ä/ö/ü) are transcribed as ae/oe/ue (e.g. Müller becomes MUELLER) while other letters simply omit the diacritics (e.g. Jérôme becomes JEROME and François becomes FRANCOIS) according to ICAO conventions.

The transcription above is generally used for airplane tickets etc., but sometimes simple vowels are used (e.g. MULLER instead of MÜLLER or MUELLER). The three possible spelling variants of the same name (e.g. Müller / Mueller / Muller) on different documents can lead to confusion, and the use of two different spellings within the same document (as in the passport) may give people who are unfamiliar with the German orthography the impression that the document is a forgery.

=== Endorsements ===
Page 1, in addition to the signature line, is the designated area for official endorsements (field 11, "Official observations").

=== Languages ===
The entire passport is written in the four official languages (German, French, Italian, and Romansch) as well as English, with the exception of page 40, containing use and care instructions only. Page 2 contains translations into 13 languages. In Pass 10, 13 additional languages were added in consideration of the 10 countries added to the EU in 2004 as well as Norwegian and Icelandic to cover the languages of the EFTA states. Consequently, the Swiss passport has 26 languages, exceeding the EU's own passports with 23 languages. Inside the back cover, the phrase "This passport contains 40 numbered pages" is written in the 26 languages. In Pass 22, all of the additional languages were removed.

=== Timeline of the Swiss passport ===
==== Pass 1915 ====
Pass 1915 had a blue/green cover with no printing, and also only had the three Swiss official languages and no security features. There were no restrictions on the size of the photograph of the bearer, which could extend beyond the page margins.

The first pages of a Swiss passport from 1916

==== Pass 1932 ====
Pass 1932 had a brown cover with a centred Swiss coat of arms and employed no security features. The Romansh language was not used.

==== Pass 59 ====
Pass 59, introduced in 1959, had a dark red cover with a Swiss coat of arms on the left and on three lines "Passeport suisse", "Schweizerpass", and "Passaporto svizzero". The inner pages were in four languages: French, German, Italian—the three national languages at the time—and English. Security features included watermarks and Guilloché printing.

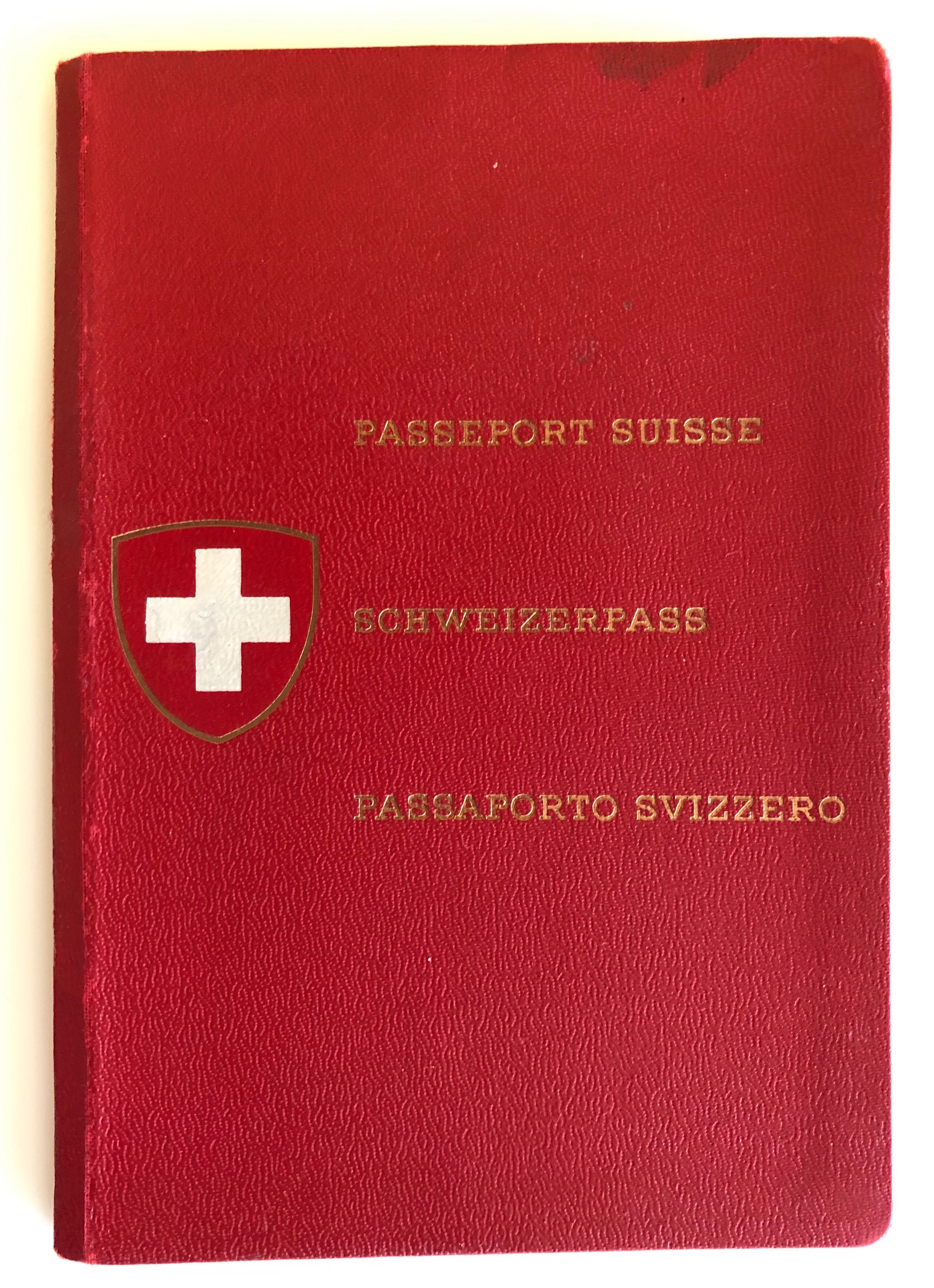
The cover of a Swiss passport from 1959

==== Pass 85 ====
Pass 85, first introduced on 1 April 1985, was designed by the Swiss graphic designer Fritz Gottschalk. Its data page was not machine readable. The medium-red cover is decorated with a large Swiss cross and the words "Swiss Passport" vertically in 5 languages. An earlier version of Pass 85 only had 4 languages, until Romansh was made a national language in Switzerland in the late 1980s. Safety features include UV-reactive paper, watermarks with the page number and Swiss cross, Guilloché printing with variegated colours, colour shift ink, and printing registration elements when the passport is held up to light. The photograph of the bearer was glued on and embossed with two seals. Black and white photographs were acceptable in Pass 85. As in older passport versions, the bearer's hair and eye colours were stated.

==== Pass 03 ====
Pass 03 was first issued on 1 January 2003, because its predecessor did not comply with current international standards. Pass 03 is also the first Swiss passport equipped with a machine-readable, polycarbonate data page. It is identical to Pass 06, except for the fact that it contains no biometric data.

The cover of a Swiss passport from 2003

==== Temporary passport (emergency passport) ====
The temporary passport is often called an "emergency passport." Under Swiss law regarding identity documents, it may be issued only when there is no time to apply for a regular passport, or a regular valid passport could not be presented (if the regular passport was lost, destroyed, or stolen for example), or if a valid passport does not meet the necessary requirements for travel (for instance when the time of passport validity is not long enough to enter a foreign country, e.g., Russia and China require more than 6 months of validity).

The temporary passport is the same as Pass 03, lacking biometric data. The front cover of the temporary passport is clearly marked with a white band on the lower half of the cover to distinguish it from a regular passport. The temporary passport only has 16 pages. There is no polycarbonate data page, instead using a laminated security paper data page. The temporary passport complies with international security standards for these types of documents and is machine readable. Its validity is 1 year.

The temporary passport can be applied for abroad at any Swiss consulate or embassy, any domestic passport office, or at the Zürich, Basel, and Geneva airports.

==== Pass 06 ====
Pass 06 was issued from 2006. It contained biometric data in an RFID chip. This was a prototype of the newest Pass 10 but limited to a 5-year validity. On page 2 contains 13 translations. The older version, Pass 03, was still usable until the date of expiry, but because of the Schengen Agreement, had to be replaced with a biometric passport upon expiry.

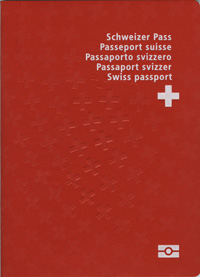
The cover of a Swiss passport from 2006

==== Pass 10 ====
Introduced on 1 March 2010, Pass 10 contains biometric data: a photograph and fingerprints. Switzerland was required to implement this type of passport in order to participate in the Schengen Agreement. Pages 2–3 contain 26 translations. Pass 10 is practically the same as Pass 06 except for a chip with biometric data. This passport was accepted in a popular referendum on 17 May 2009.

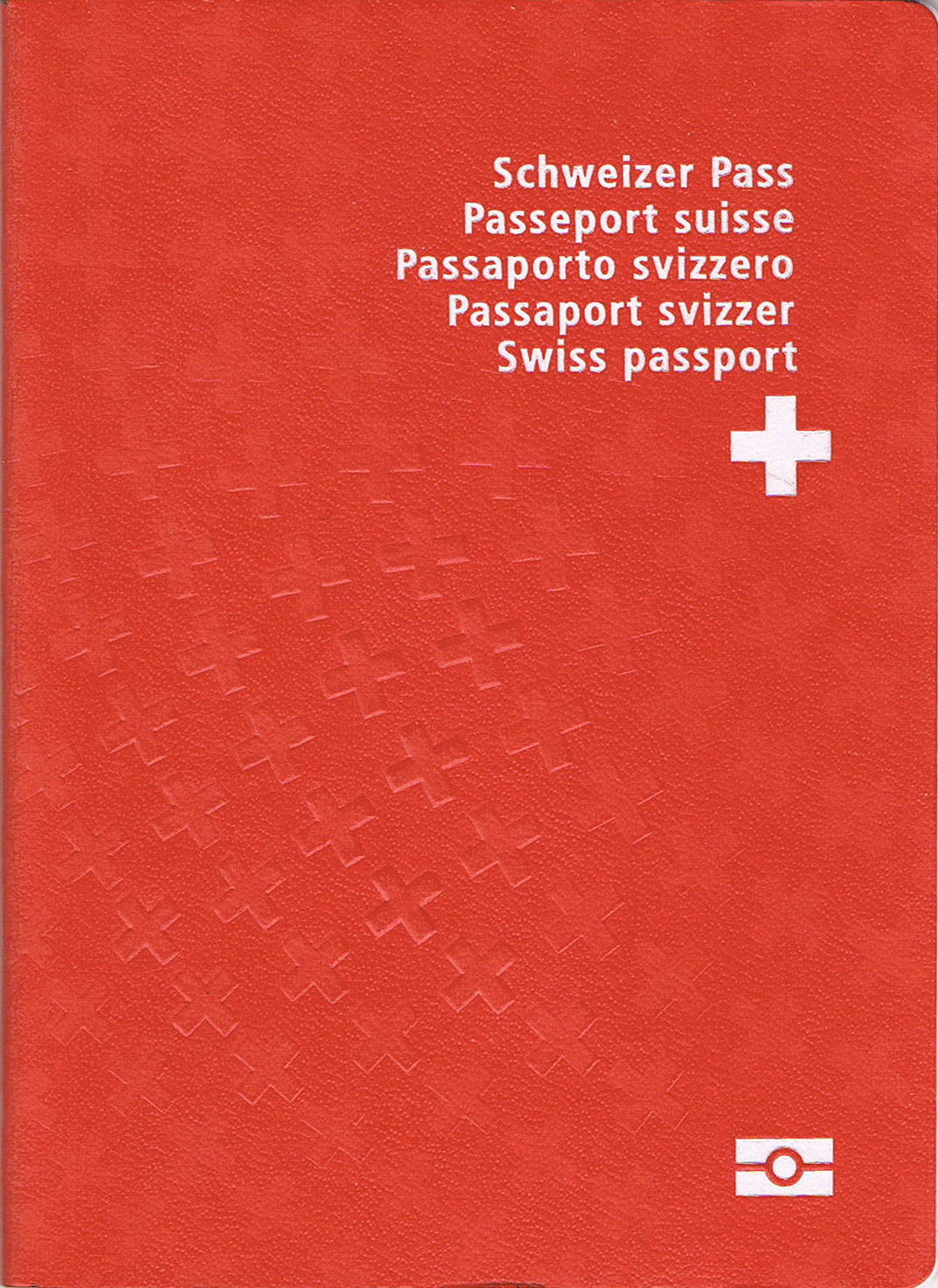
The cover of a Swiss passport from 2010

==== Present: Pass 22 ====
Available from 31 October 2022, Pass 22 has a new page design, featuring mountains and waterways from every canton of Switzerland. The passport separates the pages for every one of Switzerland’s 26 cantons. It also has an extra page for the “fifth Switzerland”.

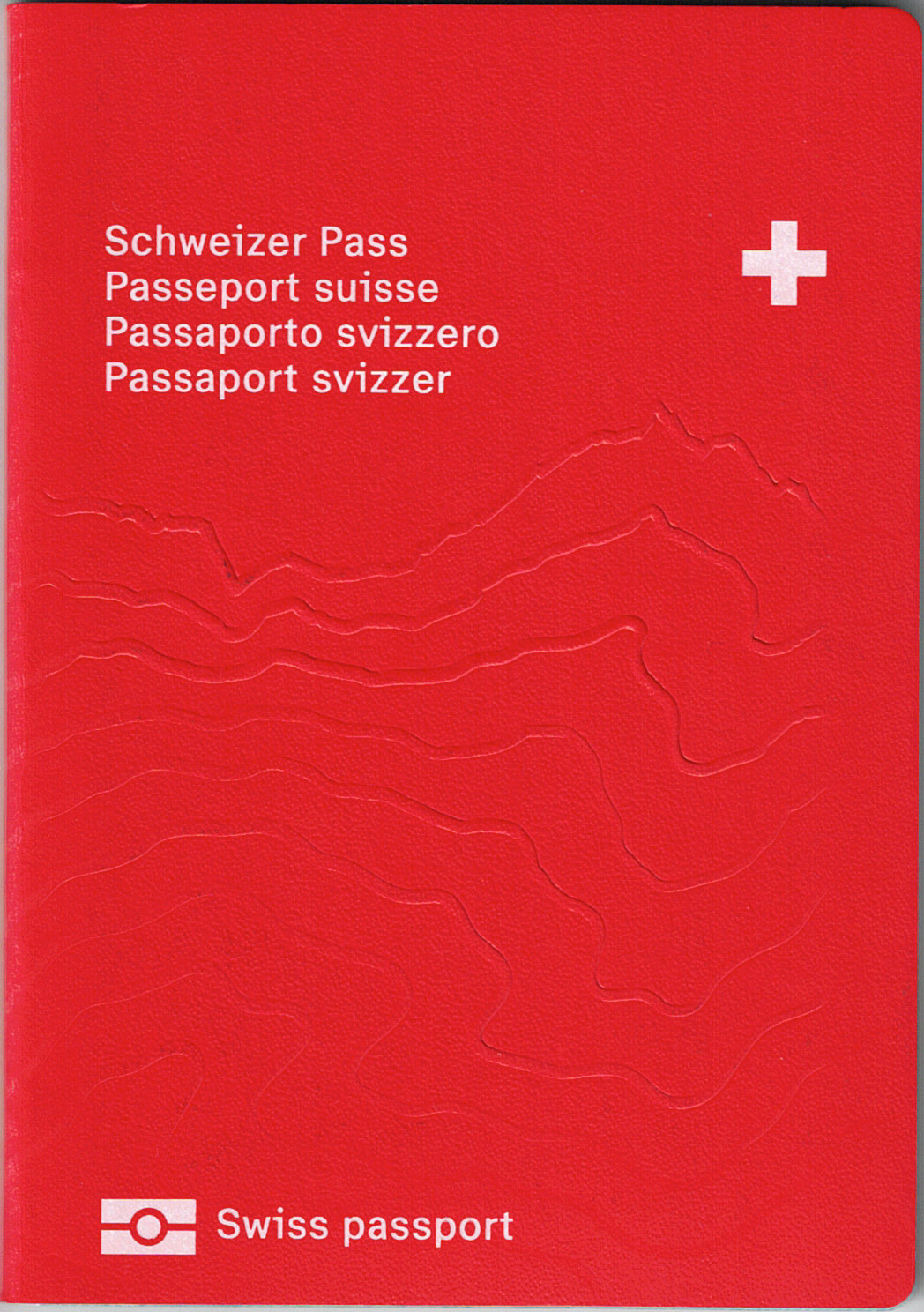
The cover of a Swiss passport from 2022

== Visa requirements ==
Visa requirements for holders of regular Swiss passports Switzerland Freedom of movement Visa not required/ESTA/ETA Visa issued upon arrival eVisa Visa available both on arrival or online Visa required prior to arrival

Visa requirements for Swiss passport holders are administrative entry restrictions by the authorities of other states placed on nationals of Switzerland. As of 2025, Swiss citizens had visa-free or visa on arrival access to 190 countries and territories, ranking the Swiss passport fifth in the world in terms of travel freedom (tied with Belgium, British, Portuguese and New Zealand's passports), according to the Henley Passport Index. Additionally, Arton Capital's Passport Index ranked the Swiss passport fourth in the world in terms of travel freedom, with a visa-free score of 164 (tied with Austrian, Belgian, British, Canadian, Greek, Irish, Japanese and Portuguese passports), as of 17 February 2019.

As a member state of the European Free Trade Association (EFTA), Swiss citizens enjoy freedom of movement to live and work in Iceland, Norway and Liechtenstein in accordance with the EFTA convention. Moreover, by virtue of Switzerland's bilateral agreements with the EU, Swiss citizens also have freedom of movement in all EU member states. All EFTA and EU citizens are not only visa-exempt but are legally entitled to enter and reside in each other's countries.

== Dual citizenship ==
Dual citizenship is allowed in Switzerland, but the requirements for the naturalization of foreigners vary from canton to canton. Male Swiss citizens, including dual citizens, can be required to perform military or civilian service, and Swiss citizens are not allowed to participate in any other military, unless they are a citizen of, and are resident in, the country in question. (The Swiss Guards of the Vatican City State are regarded as a "house police" and not as an army.)

== Price ==
Prices in Swiss francs (CHF) as of 19 January 2024

	Passport	Passport combined with ID card	Temporary Passport	Identity Card
Children up to 18	CHF 65	CHF 78	CHF 100	CHF 35
Adult	CHF 145	CHF 158	CHF 100	CHF 70

Temporary passports issued by the Federal Police at airports incur an additional fee of CHF 50.

== See also ==
- Passports of the EFTA member states
- Swiss identity card

== References and sources ==
Sources

- Council regulation 539/2001
- Council regulation 1932/2006
- Council regulation 539/2001 consolidated version, 19 January 2007
