= Swiss identity card =

National identity card of Switzerland

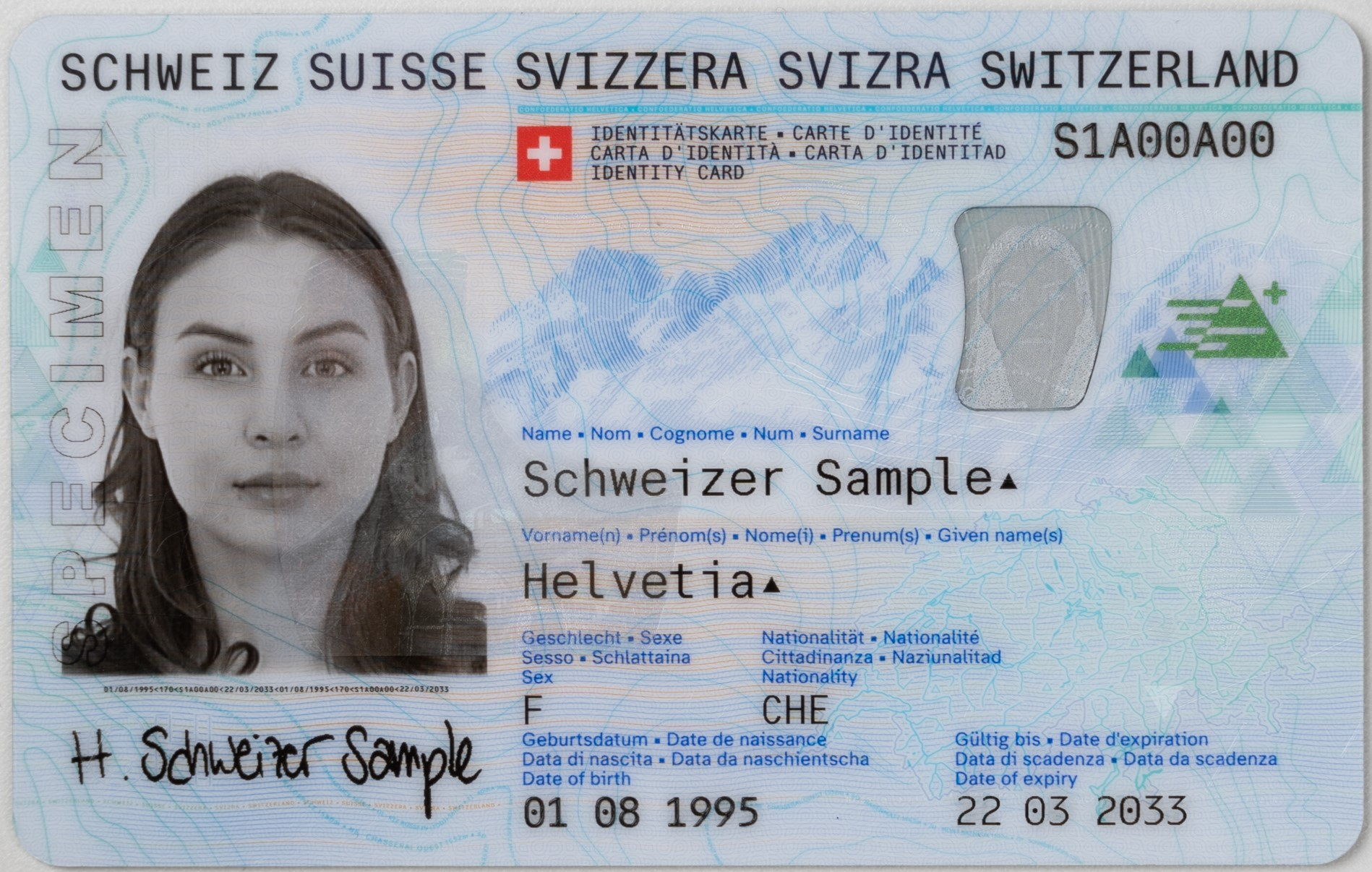
- Non-biometric card

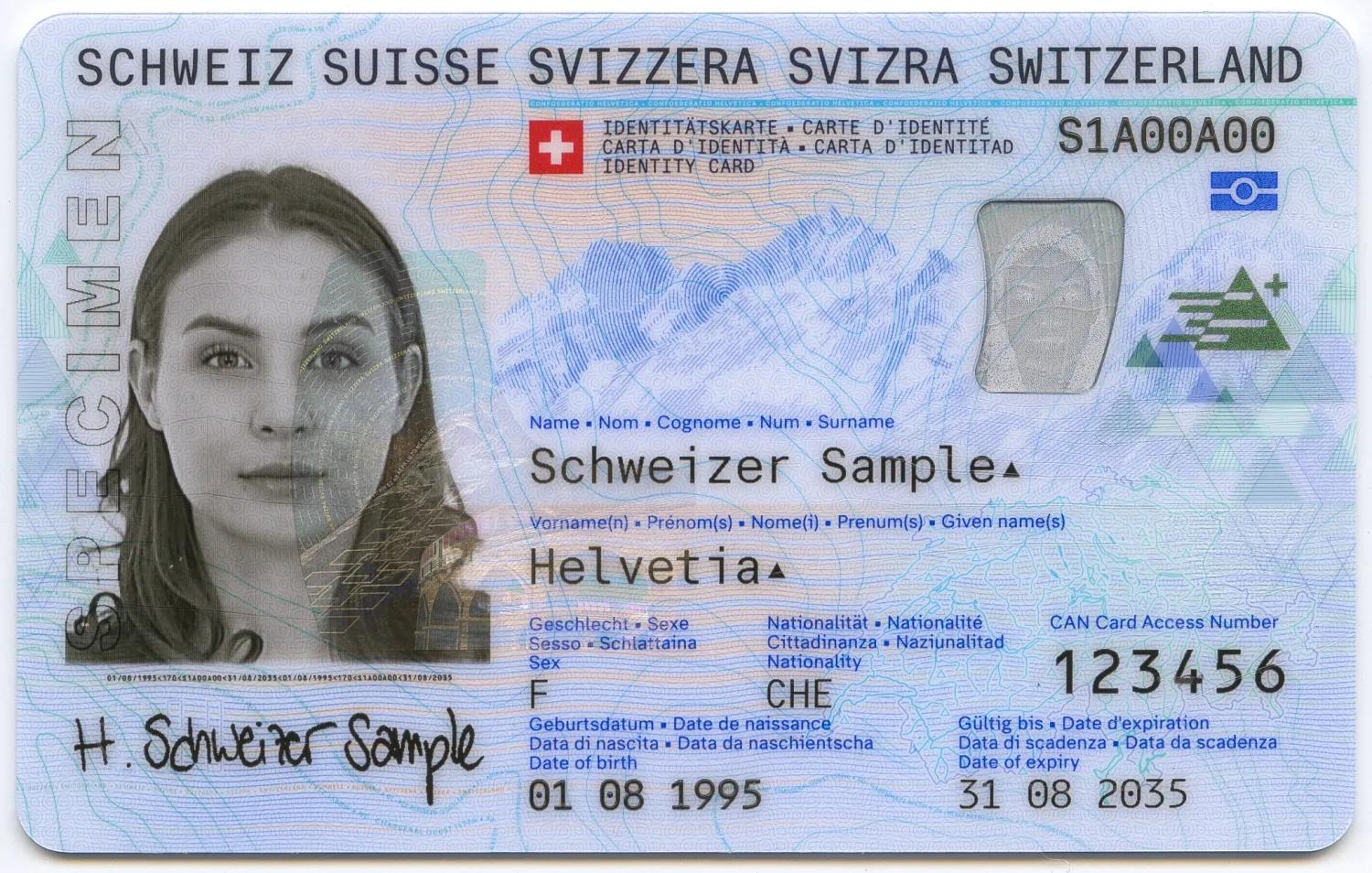
- Biometric card
- Type: Optional identity document, optional replacement for passport (see below)
- Issued by: Switzerland
- First issued: 3 March 2023 (non-biometric); 2 November 2026 (biometric)
- Valid in: EFTA; European Union; United Kingdom (EU Settlement Scheme); Rest of Europe (except Belarus, Russia, and Ukraine) Georgia; Montserrat (max. 14 days); Overseas France; Turkey
- Eligibility: Swiss citizenship
- Expiration: 10 years (age 18 and over); 5 years (age under 18)

The Swiss identity card in its current form dates back to July 1994. It is in the form of a plastic photocard. It can be used as a travel document when travelling within European Free Trade Association or to the European Union, the European microstates, Georgia, and Turkey.

== History ==
The Swiss identity card first introduced in 1955 was blue. After World War II, European travel was starting to be more prevalent and the Swiss confederation also wanted to make it easier for Swiss citizens to identify themselves within everyday business operations like picking up parcels or registered mail from the post office.

The Swiss identity card was then modified in 1977 and it changed its colour to a more green/brown colour. Both the 1955 and 1977 series of Swiss identity cards were in a booklet format with the outer page on the 1955 ID card having the coat of arms of Switzerland, and then text in what were then the only three national languages of Switzerland: German, French, and Italian.

When the 1977 version of the Swiss identity card was issued, the first issue was still printed in German, French, and Italian. Later on, Romansch was added to the identity cards (along with English) after it became a national Swiss language in the new 1999 Swiss constitution that followed the 6 March 1996 referendum of Swiss voters.

It was planned to introduce a new identity card by the end of 2016. This would then have been available in four versions with the applicant choosing the version to be issued to them. There were plans for a basic version without electronically stored data, a version with electronically stored biometric data (photo and two fingerprints), a version with electronically stored credentials for e-government and e-business, and a fourth version which would have been a combination of the second and third versions. However, on 13 January 2016 the federal Swiss government, when announcing the next steps to be taken for state-approved electronic identities, stated in a footnote that it does not expect the new identity card to be available before 2019. It sees no immediate need to have a biometric identity card available with a biometric chip.

As of 3 March 2023 a new model with the latest security technology is issued, however the card does not yet have a biometric chip.

Swiss biometric ID card complying with European standard is issued as of 2 November 2026. This model does not replace the non-biometric one, but is an additional option available to Swiss citizens.

== Travel document ==
As a member state of the European Free Trade Association (EFTA), Swiss citizens enjoy freedom of movement to live and work in other EFTA countries in accordance with the EFTA convention. Moreover, by virtue of Switzerland's bilateral agreements with the EU, Swiss citizens also have freedom of movement in all EU member states.

As an alternative to presenting a passport, Swiss citizens are entitled to use a valid national identity card to exercise their right of free movement in EFTA and the EU. Strictly speaking, it is not necessary for an EEA or Swiss citizen to possess a valid national identity card or passport to enter the EEA and Switzerland. In theory, if an EEA or Swiss citizen can prove their nationality by any other means (e.g. by presenting an expired national identity card or passport, or a citizenship certificate), they must be permitted to enter the EEA and Switzerland. An EEA or Swiss citizen who is unable to demonstrate their nationality satisfactorily must, nonetheless, be given 'every reasonable opportunity' to obtain the necessary documents or to have them delivered within a reasonable period of time.

== See also ==
- National identity cards in the European Economic Area
- Identity document
- Swiss passport
