= Napoleon III =

Emperor of the French from 1852 to 1870

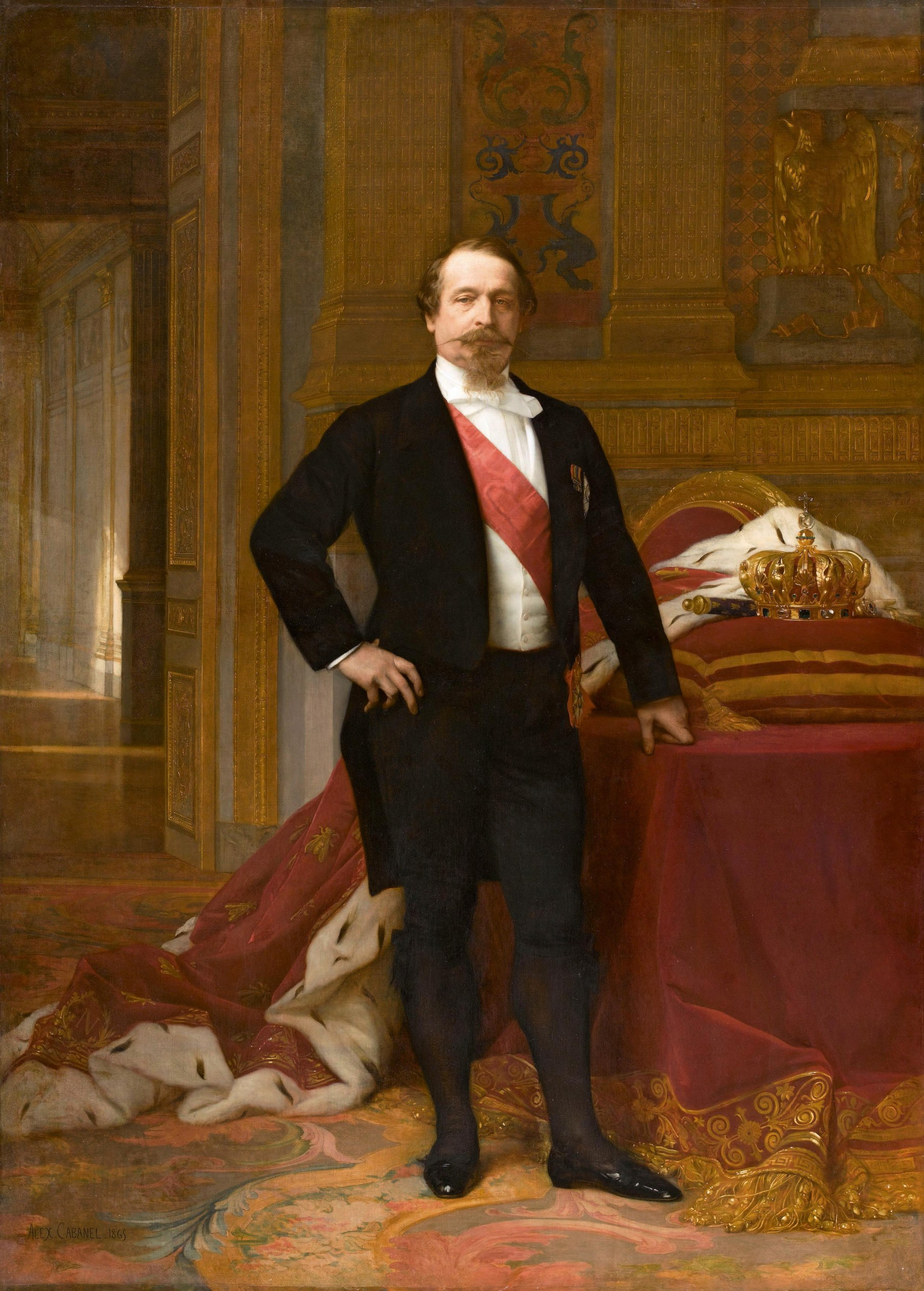
- Portrait of Napoleon III, 1865

Emperor of the French
- Reign: 2 December 1852 – 4 September 1870
- Predecessor: Himself (as president)
- Successor: Adolphe Thiers (as president)
- Cabinet Chief: Émile Ollivier; Charles Cousin-Montauban

President of France
- In office 20 December 1848 – 2 December 1852
- Prime Minister: Odilon Barrot; Alphonse Henri d'Hautpoul; Léon Faucher
- Vice President: Henri Georges Boulay de la Meurthe
- Preceded by: Louis-Eugène Cavaignac (as chief of the Executive Power)
- Succeeded by: Himself (as emperor)

Head of the House of Bonaparte
- Tenure; 25 July 1846 – 9 January 1873
- Preceded by: Louis, Count of Saint-Leu
- Succeeded by: Louis-Napoléon, Prince Imperial
- Born: Charles-Louis Napoléon Bonaparte; 20 April 1808; Paris, France
- Died: 9 January 1873 (aged 64); Chislehurst, Kent, England
- Burial: 15 January 1873 – 8 January 1888; St Mary's Church, Chislehurst; 8 January 1888 – present St Michael's Abbey, Farnborough
- Spouse: Eugénie de Montijo (m. 1853)
- Issue: Louis-Napoléon, Prince Imperial
- House: Bonaparte
- Father: Louis Bonaparte
- Mother: Hortense de Beauharnais
- Military career
- Allegiance: Second French Empire
- Branch: French Armed Forces
- Service years: 1859–1870
- Rank: Commander-in-Chief of the French Armed Forces (1848–1870)
- Units: Army of the Rhine (1870); Army of Châlons (1870)
- Military career
- Conflicts: French Conquest of Algeria; Crimean War; Second Opium War; Second Italian War of Independence; Battle of Magenta; Battle of Solferino; Second French Intervention in Mexico; French conquest of Vietnam; Franco-Prussian War; Battle of Saarbrücken; Battle of Sedan (surrendered)

Napoleon III (born Charles-Louis Napoléon Bonaparte; (Note: "Charles" was removed from his name shortly after his birth. Before taking the throne, he was known as Louis Napoléon Bonaparte.) 20 April 1808 – 9 January 1873) was the first president of France from 1848 to 1852 and then Emperor of the French from 1852 until his deposition in 1870. He was the first elected president, second emperor, and the last monarch of France. He established the Second French Empire in 1852, which began a period of rapid industrialization and expansion of infrastructure in France and saw the rise of French influence in geopolitics after several decades of instability. As head of state of France for 22 years, he was the longest-reigning French head of state since the end of the Ancien régime.

Napoleon III was born at the height of the First French Empire in the Tuileries Palace in Paris, the son of Louis Bonaparte, King of Holland (r. 1806–1810), and Hortense de Beauharnais. He was the paternal nephew of the reigning Emperor Napoleon I. As a young man, he led two failed coups against the July Monarchy, for which he was imprisoned in 1840. In 1848, after the overthrow of the July Monarchy in the February Revolution, he was elected president of the French Second Republic. He seized power by force in 1851 when he could not constitutionally be re-elected. He later proclaimed himself Emperor of the French and founded the Second Empire, reigning until the defeat of the French Army and his capture by Prussia and its allies at the Battle of Sedan in 1870.

Napoleon III commissioned a grand reconstruction of Paris carried out by the prefect of the Seine, Georges-Eugène Haussmann. He expanded and consolidated the railway system throughout the nation and modernized the banking system in France. Napoleon promoted the building of the Suez Canal in Egypt and established modern agriculture, which ended famines in France and made the country an agricultural exporter. He negotiated the 1860 Cobden–Chevalier Treaty with Britain and similar agreements with France's other European trading partners. Social reforms were enacted giving workers the right to organize and the right to strike, and women the right to be admitted to universities.

In foreign policy, Napoleon III aimed to reassert French influence in Europe and elsewhere. In Europe, he allied the French with Britain and defeated Russia in the Crimean War (1853–1856). His regime assisted Italian unification by defeating the Austrian Empire in the Second Italian War of Independence and later annexed Savoy and Nice through the Treaty of Turin as its deferred reward. At the same time, his forces defended the Papal States against annexation by Italy. He was also favourable towards the 1859 union of the Danubian Principalities, which resulted in the establishment of the United Principalities of Moldavia and Wallachia. Napoleon III doubled the area of the French colonial empire with acquisitions in Asia, Africa, and the Pacific. On the other hand, the intervention in Mexico, which aimed to create a Second Mexican Empire under French protection, ended up in total failure.

From 1866, Napoleon III had to face the aggressive mounting power of Prussia as its minister president Otto von Bismarck sought German unification (later serving as its first chancellor) under Prussian leadership. In July 1870, Napoleon III reluctantly declared war on Prussia after pressure from the general public. The French Army was rapidly defeated, and Napoleon III was captured at Sedan. He was swiftly dethroned and the French Third Republic was proclaimed in Paris. After he was released from German custody, he went into exile in the United Kingdom, where he died in 1873.

== Childhood and family ==
=== Early life ===
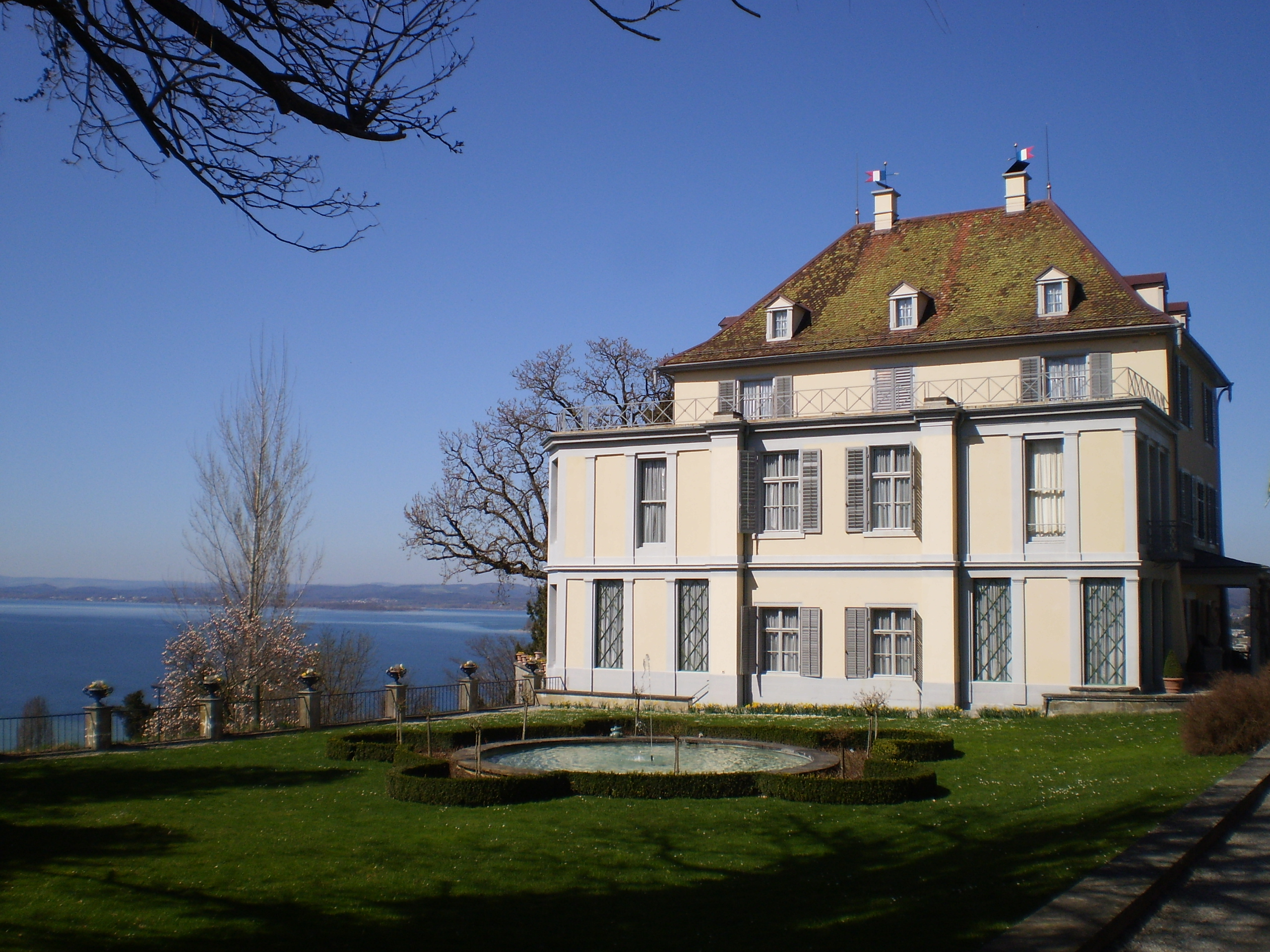
The lakeside house at Arenenberg, Switzerland, where Louis Napoleon spent much of his youth and exile

Charles-Louis Napoleon Bonaparte, later known as Louis Napoleon and then Napoleon III, was born in Paris on the night of 19–20 April 1808. His father was Louis Bonaparte, the younger brother of Napoleon Bonaparte, who made Louis the King of Holland from 1806 until 1810. His mother was Hortense de Beauharnais, the only daughter of Napoleon's wife Joséphine de Beauharnais by her first marriage to Alexandre de Beauharnais. He was the first Bonaparte prince born after the proclamation of the First French Empire.

As empress, Joséphine had proposed the marriage of Louis and Hortense as a way to produce an heir for the Emperor, who agreed, as Joséphine was by then infertile. Louis and Hortense had a difficult relationship and only lived together for brief periods. Their first son, Napoléon-Charles Bonaparte, died in 1807 and—though separated and parents of a healthy second son, Napoléon Louis—they decided to have a third child. They resumed their marriage for a brief time in Toulouse starting from 12 August 1807 and Louis Napoleon was born prematurely, (at least) three weeks short of nine months. Hortense was known to have lovers and Louis Napoleon's enemies, including Victor Hugo, spread the gossip that he was the child of a different man. The hypothesis of illegitimacy is currently considered possible but not demonstrable, and the 2014 genetic investigations also reported that Napoleon III belonged to a Y-chromosomal haplogroup different from that associated with the Bonaparte male line, though this claim remains contested and has not gained universal acceptance.

Louis Napoleon was baptized at the Palace of Fontainebleau on 5 November 1810, with Emperor Napoleon serving as his godfather and Empress Marie-Louise as his godmother. His father stayed away, once again separated from Hortense. At the age of seven, Louis Napoleon visited his uncle at the Tuileries Palace in Paris. Napoleon held him up to the window to see the soldiers parading in the Place du Carrousel below. Louis Napoleon last saw his uncle with the family at the Château de Malmaison, shortly before Napoleon departed for the Battle of Waterloo.

All members of the House of Bonaparte were forced into exile after the defeat of Napoleon at the Battle of Waterloo and the Bourbon Restoration of monarchy in France. Hortense and Louis Napoleon moved from Aix-les-Bains to Bern to Baden-Baden, and finally to a lakeside house at Arenenberg in the Swiss canton of Thurgau. He received some of his education in Germany at the gymnasium school at Augsburg, Bavaria. As a result, for the rest of his life, his French had a slight but noticeable German accent. His tutor at home was Philippe Le Bas, an ardent republican and the son of a revolutionary and close friend of Robespierre. Le Bas taught him French history and radical politics.

=== Romantic revolutionary (1823–1835) ===
When Louis Napoleon was 15, his mother Hortense moved to Rome, where the Bonapartes had a villa. He passed his time learning Italian, exploring the ancient ruins and learning the arts of seduction and romantic affairs, which he used often in his later life. He became friends with the French Ambassador, François-René de Chateaubriand, the father of romanticism in French literature, with whom he remained in contact for many years. He was reunited with his older brother Napoléon-Louis; together they became involved with the Carbonari, secret revolutionary societies fighting Austria's domination of Northern Italy. In the spring of 1831, when Louis Napoleon was 23, the Austrian and Papal governments launched an offensive against the Carbonari. The two brothers, wanted by the police, were forced to flee. During their flight, Napoléon-Louis contracted measles. He died in his brother's arms on 17 March 1831. Hortense joined Louis Napoleon and together they evaded the police and Austrian Army and finally reached the French border.

Hortense and Louis Napoleon traveled incognito to Paris, where the old regime of King Charles X had just fallen after the July Revolution and been replaced by the more liberal regime of Louis Philippe I, the sole monarch of the July Monarchy. They arrived in Paris on 23 April 1831, and took up residence under the name "Hamilton" in the Hotel du Holland on Place Vendôme. Hortense wrote an appeal to the King of the French, asking to stay in France, and Louis Napoleon offered to volunteer as an ordinary soldier in the French Army. The new king agreed to meet secretly with Hortense; Louis Napoleon had a fever and did not join them. The King finally agreed that Hortense and Louis Napoleon could stay in Paris as long as their stay was brief and incognito. Louis Napoleon was told that he could join the French Army if he would simply change his name, something he indignantly refused to do.

Hortense and Louis Napoleon remained in Paris until 5 May, the tenth anniversary of the death of Napoleon. The presence of Hortense and Louis Napoleon in the hotel had become known, and a public demonstration of mourning for the Emperor took place on Place Vendôme in front of their hotel. The same day, Hortense and Louis Napoleon were ordered to leave Paris. During their brief stay in Paris Louis Napoleon had become convinced that Bonapartist sentiment was still strong among the French people and the army. They went to Britain briefly, and then back into exile in Switzerland.

== Early adult years ==
=== Bonapartist succession and philosophy of Bonapartism ===
Ever since the fall of Napoleon in 1815, a Bonapartist movement had existed in France, hoping to return a Bonaparte to the throne. According to the law of succession established by Napoleon I, the claim passed first to his own son, declared "King of Rome" at birth by his father. This heir, known by Bonapartists as Napoleon II, was living in virtual imprisonment at the court of Vienna under the title Duke of Reichstadt. Next in line was Louis Napoleon's eldest uncle, Joseph Bonaparte, followed by Louis Bonaparte, but neither Joseph nor Louis had any interest in re-entering public life. When the Duke of Reichstadt died in 1832, Louis Napoleon became the de facto heir of the dynasty and the leader of the Bonapartist cause.

In exile with his mother in Switzerland, Louis Napoleon enrolled in the Swiss Army, trained to become an officer, and wrote a manual of artillery (his uncle Napoleon had become famous as an artillery officer). Louis Napoleon also began writing about his political philosophy—for as the early twentieth-century English historian H. A. L. Fisher suggested, "the programme of the Empire was not the improvisation of a vulgar adventurer" but the result of deep reflection on the Napoleonic political philosophy and on how to adjust it to the changed domestic and international scenes. As early as 1832 he presented a reconciliation between Bonapartism and republicanism through the principle of popular sovereignty. He believed a strong emperor existed to execute the will of the people.

He published his Rêveries politiques or "political dreams" in 1833 at the age of 25, followed in 1834 by Considérations politiques et militaires sur la Suisse ("Political and military considerations about Switzerland"), followed in 1839 by Les Idées napoléoniennes ("Napoleonic Ideas"), a compendium of his political ideas which was published in three editions and eventually translated into six languages. He based his doctrine upon two ideas: universal suffrage and the primacy of the national interest. He called for a "monarchy which procures the advantages of the Republic without the inconveniences", a regime "strong without despotism, free without anarchy, independent without conquest". He also intended to build a wider European community of nations.

=== Failed coup, exile in London (1836–1840) ===
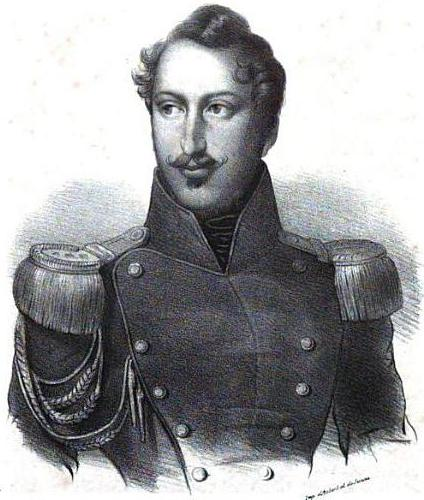
Etching portrait of Louis Napoleon at the time of his failed coup in 1836

"I believe", wrote Louis Napoleon, "that from time to time, men are created whom I call volunteers of providence, in whose hands are placed the destiny of their countries. I believe I am one of those men. If I am wrong, I can perish uselessly. If I am right, then providence will put me into a position to fulfill my mission." He had seen the popular enthusiasm for Napoleon Bonaparte when he was in Paris, and he was convinced that, if he marched to Paris, as Napoleon had done in 1815 during the Hundred Days, France would rise up and join him. He began to plan a coup against King Louis-Philippe.

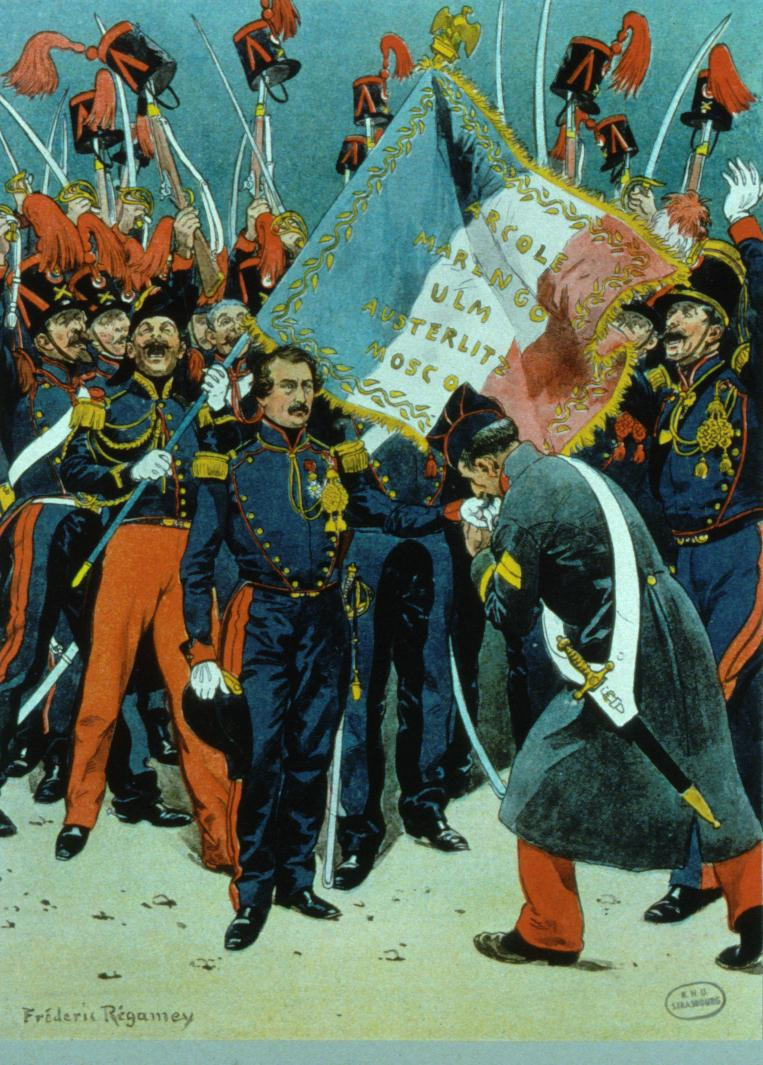
Louis Napoleon launching his failed coup in Strasbourg in 1836

He planned for his uprising to begin in Strasbourg. The colonel of a regiment was brought over to the cause. On 29 October 1836, Louis Napoleon arrived in Strasbourg, in the uniform of an artillery officer; he rallied the regiment to his side. The prefecture was seized, and the prefect arrested. Unfortunately for Louis Napoleon, the general commanding the garrison escaped and called in a loyal regiment, which surrounded the mutineers. The mutineers surrendered and Louis Napoleon fled back to Switzerland.

Louis Napoleon was widely popular in exile and his popularity in France continuously grew after his failed coup in 1836 as it established him as heir to the Bonaparte legend and increased his publicity.

King Louis Philippe had demanded that the Swiss government return Louis Napoleon to France, but the Swiss pointed out that he was a Swiss soldier and citizen and refused to hand him over. The King responded by sending an army to the Swiss border. Louis Napoleon thanked his Swiss hosts and voluntarily left the country. The other mutineers were put on trial in Alsace, and were all acquitted.

Louis Napoleon traveled first to London, then to Brazil, and then to New York City. He met the elite of New York society and the writer Washington Irving. While he was traveling to see more of the United States, he received word that his mother was very ill. He hurried as quickly as he could back to Switzerland. He reached Arenenberg in time to be with his mother on 5 August 1837, when she died. She was finally buried in Rueil, in France, next to her mother, on 11 January 1838, but Louis Napoleon could not attend, because he was not allowed into France.

Louis Napoleon returned to London for a new period of exile in October 1838. He had inherited a large fortune from his mother and took a house with 17 servants and several of his old friends and fellow conspirators. He was received by London society and met the political and scientific leaders of the day, including Benjamin Disraeli and Michael Faraday. He also did considerable research into the economy of Britain. He strolled in Hyde Park, which he later used as a model when he created the Bois de Boulogne in Paris. He spent the winter of 1838–1839 in Royal Leamington Spa in Warwickshire.

=== Second coup, prison, escape and exile (1840–1848) ===
Living comfortably in London, he had not given up the dream of returning to France to seize power. In the summer of 1840, he purchased weapons and uniforms, had proclamations printed, gathered a contingent of about sixty armed men, and hired a ship called the Edinburgh Castle. On 6 August 1840, he sailed across the Channel to the port of Boulogne.

The attempted coup turned into an even greater fiasco than the Strasbourg mutiny. The mutineers were stopped by customs agents, the soldiers of the garrison refused to join them, and the group was surrounded on the beach; one man was killed and the others were arrested. Both the British and French press ridiculed Louis Napoleon and his plot. The newspaper Le Journal des Débats wrote, “this surpasses comedy. One does not kill madmen; one locks them up.”

He was put on trial and, despite an eloquent defense of his cause, was sentenced to life imprisonment in the fortress of Ham, in the Somme department of northern France.

=== Activities ===
The register of the fortress Ham for 7 October 1840 contained a concise description of the new prisoner: "Age: thirty-two years. Height: one meter sixty-six. Hair and eyebrows: chestnut. Eyes: Gray and small. Nose: large. Mouth: ordinary. Beard: brown. Moustache: blond. Chin: pointed. Face: oval. Complexion: pale. Head: sunken in his shoulders, and large shoulders. Back: bent. Lips: thick." He had a mistress named Eléonore Vergeot, a young woman from the town of Ham, who gave birth to two of his children.

While in prison, Louis Napoleon wrote poems, political essays, and articles on diverse topics. He contributed articles to regional newspapers and magazines in towns all over France, becoming quite well known as a writer. His most famous book was L'extinction du pauperisme (1844), a study of the causes of poverty in the French industrial working class, with proposals to eliminate it. His conclusion: "The working class has nothing, it is necessary to give them ownership. They have no other wealth than their own labor, it is necessary to give them work that will benefit all....they are without organization and without connections, without rights and without a future; it is necessary to give them rights and a future and to raise them in their own eyes by association, education, and discipline." He proposed various practical ideas for creating a banking and savings system that would provide credit to the working class, and to establish agricultural colonies. This book was widely reprinted and circulated in France, and played an important part in his future electoral success.

Louis Napoleon was busy in prison, but also unhappy and impatient. He was aware that the popularity of his uncle was steadily increasing in France; Napoleon I was the subject of heroic poems, books and plays. Huge crowds had gathered in Paris on 15 December 1840 when the remains of Napoleon were returned with great ceremony to Paris and handed over to King Louis Philippe, while Louis Napoleon could only read about it in prison. On 25 May 1846, with the assistance of his doctor and other friends on the outside, he disguised himself as a laborer carrying lumber, and walked out of the prison. His enemies later derisively called him "Badinguet", the name of the laborer whose identity he had assumed. A carriage was waiting to take him to the coast and then by boat to England. A month after his escape, his father Louis died, making Louis Napoleon the clear heir to the Bonaparte dynasty.

=== Return and early affairs ===
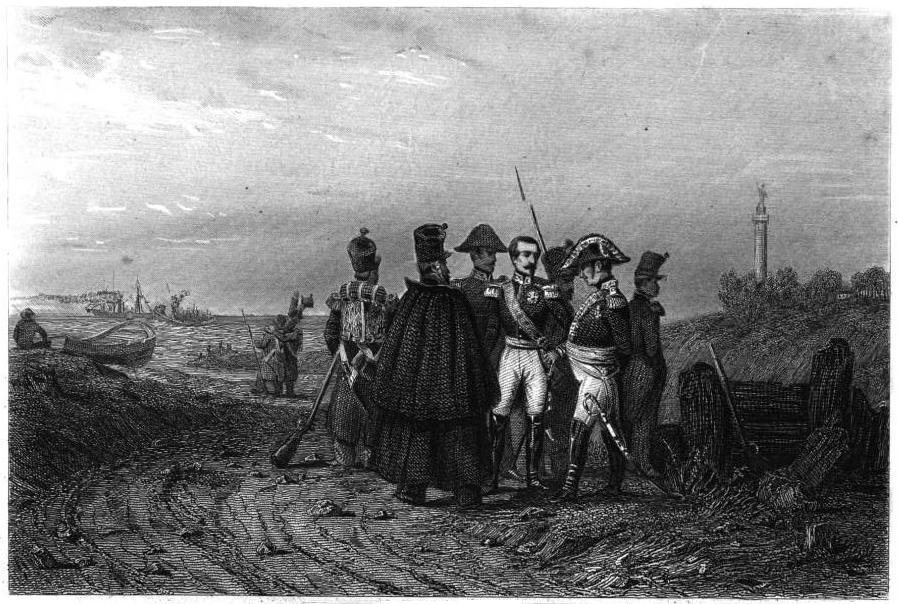
Louis Napoleon's 1840 attempt to lead an uprising against King Louis Philippe ended in fiasco and ridicule. He was sentenced to prison for life in the fortress of Ham in Northern France.

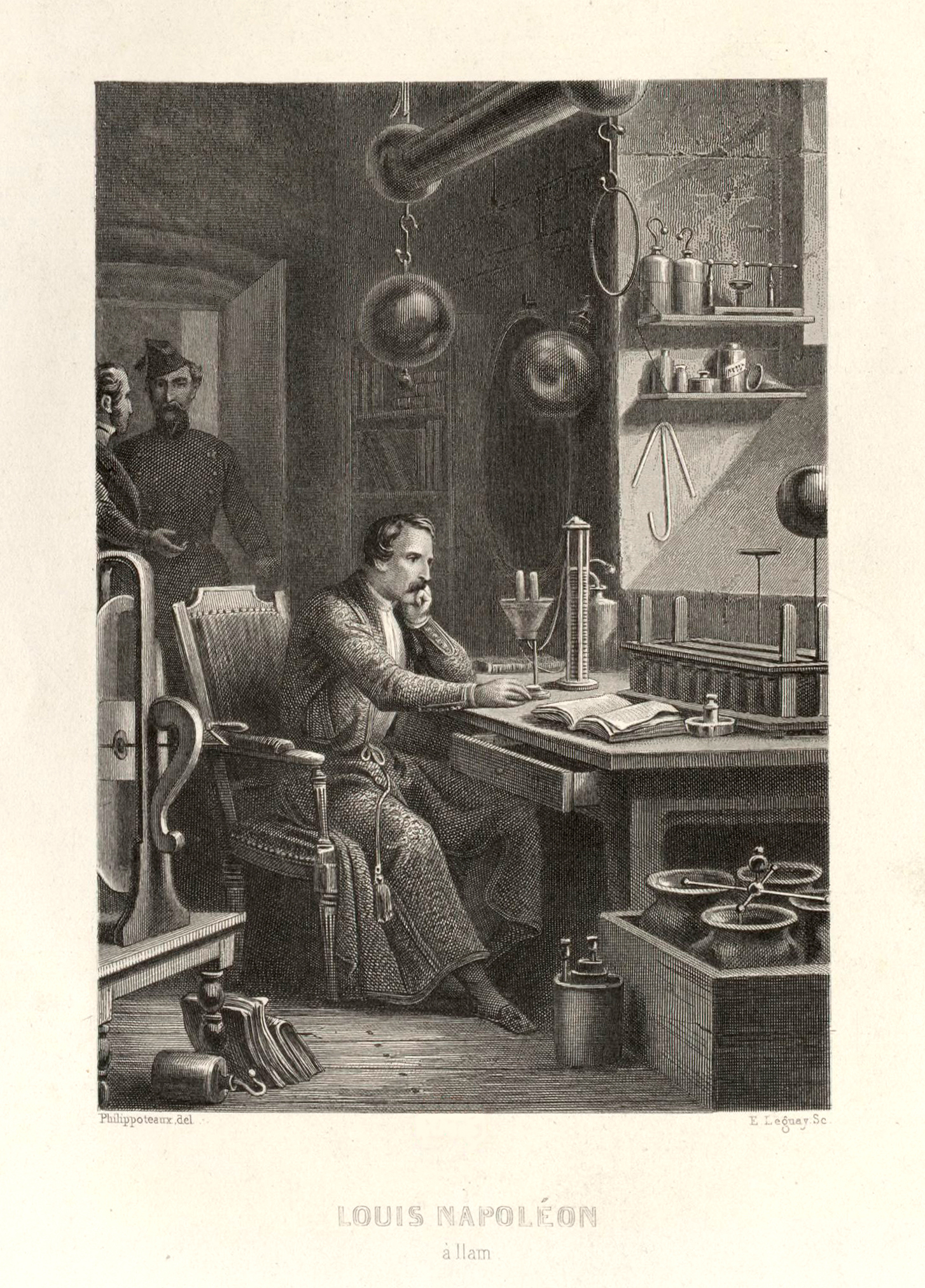
Louis Napoleon in his room in the fortress of Ham where he studied, wrote, and conducted scientific experiments. He later often referred to what he had learned at "the University of Ham".

Louis Napoleon quickly resumed his place in British society. He lived on King Street, St James's, London, went to the theatre and hunted, renewed his acquaintance with Benjamin Disraeli, and met Charles Dickens. He went back to his studies at the British Museum. He had an affair with the actress Rachel, the most famous French actress of the period, during her tours to Britain. More important for his future career, he had an affair with the wealthy heiress Harriet Howard (1823–1865). They met in 1846, soon after his return to Britain. They began to live together, and she took in his two illegitimate children and raised them with her own son, and she provided financing for his political plans so that, when the moment came, he could return to France.

== Early political career ==
=== 1848 Revolution and birth of the Second Republic ===
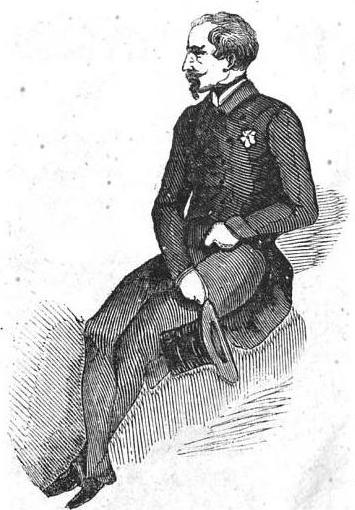
Louis Napoleon as a member of the National Assembly in 1848. He spoke rarely in the Assembly, but, because of his name, had enormous popularity in the country.

In February 1848, Louis Napoleon learned that the French Revolution of 1848 had broken out; as Louis Philippe I, faced with opposition within his government and army, abdicated. Believing that his time had finally come, he set out for Paris on 27 February, departing England on the same day that Louis-Philippe left France for his own exile in England. When he arrived in Paris, he found that the Second Republic had been declared, led by a Provisional Government headed by a Commission led by Alphonse de Lamartine, and that different factions of republicans, from conservatives to those on the far left, were competing for power. He wrote to Lamartine announcing his arrival, saying that he "was without any other ambition than that of serving my country". Lamartine wrote back politely but firmly, asking Louis-Napoleon to leave Paris "until the city is more calm, and not before the elections for the National Assembly". His close advisors urged him to stay and try to take power, but he wanted to show his prudence and loyalty to the Republic; while his advisors remained in Paris, he returned to London on 2 March 1848 and watched events from there.

Louis Napoleon did not run in the first elections for the National Assembly, held in April 1848, but three members of the Bonaparte family, Napoléon-Jérôme Bonaparte, Pierre Napoléon Bonaparte, and Lucien Murat were elected; the name Bonaparte still had political power. In the next elections, on 4 June, where candidates could run in multiple departments, he was elected in four different departments; in Paris, he was among the top five candidates, just after the conservative leader Adolphe Thiers and Victor Hugo. His followers were mostly on the left, from the peasantry and working class. His pamphlet on "The Extinction of Pauperism" was widely circulated in Paris, and his name was cheered with those of the socialist candidates Barbès and Louis Blanc.

The Moderate Republican leaders of the provisional government, Lamartine and Cavaignac, considered arresting Louis Napoleon as a dangerous revolutionary, but once again he outmaneuvered them. He wrote to the president of the provisional government: "I believe I should wait to return to the heart of my country, so that my presence in France will not serve as a pretext to the enemies of the Republic."

In June 1848, the June Days Uprising broke out in Paris, led by the far left, against the conservative majority in the National Assembly. Hundreds of barricades appeared in the working-class neighborhoods. General Louis-Eugène Cavaignac, the leader of the army, first withdrew his soldiers from Paris to allow the insurgents to deploy their barricades, and then returned with overwhelming force to crush the uprising; from 24 to 26 June, there were battles in the streets of the working class districts of Paris. An estimated five thousand insurgents were killed at the barricades, fifteen thousand were arrested, and four thousand deported.

Louis Napoleon's absence from Paris meant that he was not connected either with the uprising, or with the brutal repression that had followed. He was still in London on 17–18 September, when the elections for the National Assembly were held, but he was a candidate in thirteen departments. He was elected in five departments; in Paris, he received 110,000 votes of the 247,000 cast, the highest number of votes of any candidate. He returned to Paris on 24 September, and this time he took his place in the National Assembly. In seven months, he had gone from a political exile in London to a highly visible place in the National Assembly, as the government finished the new constitution and prepared for the first election ever of a president of the French Republic.

=== Presidential election of 1848 ===
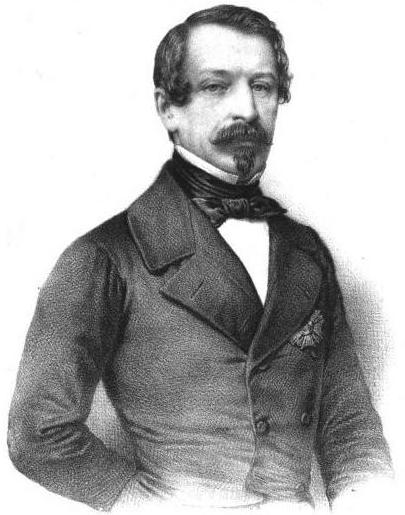
Louis Napoleon captured 74.2 percent of votes cast in the first French direct presidential elections in 1848.

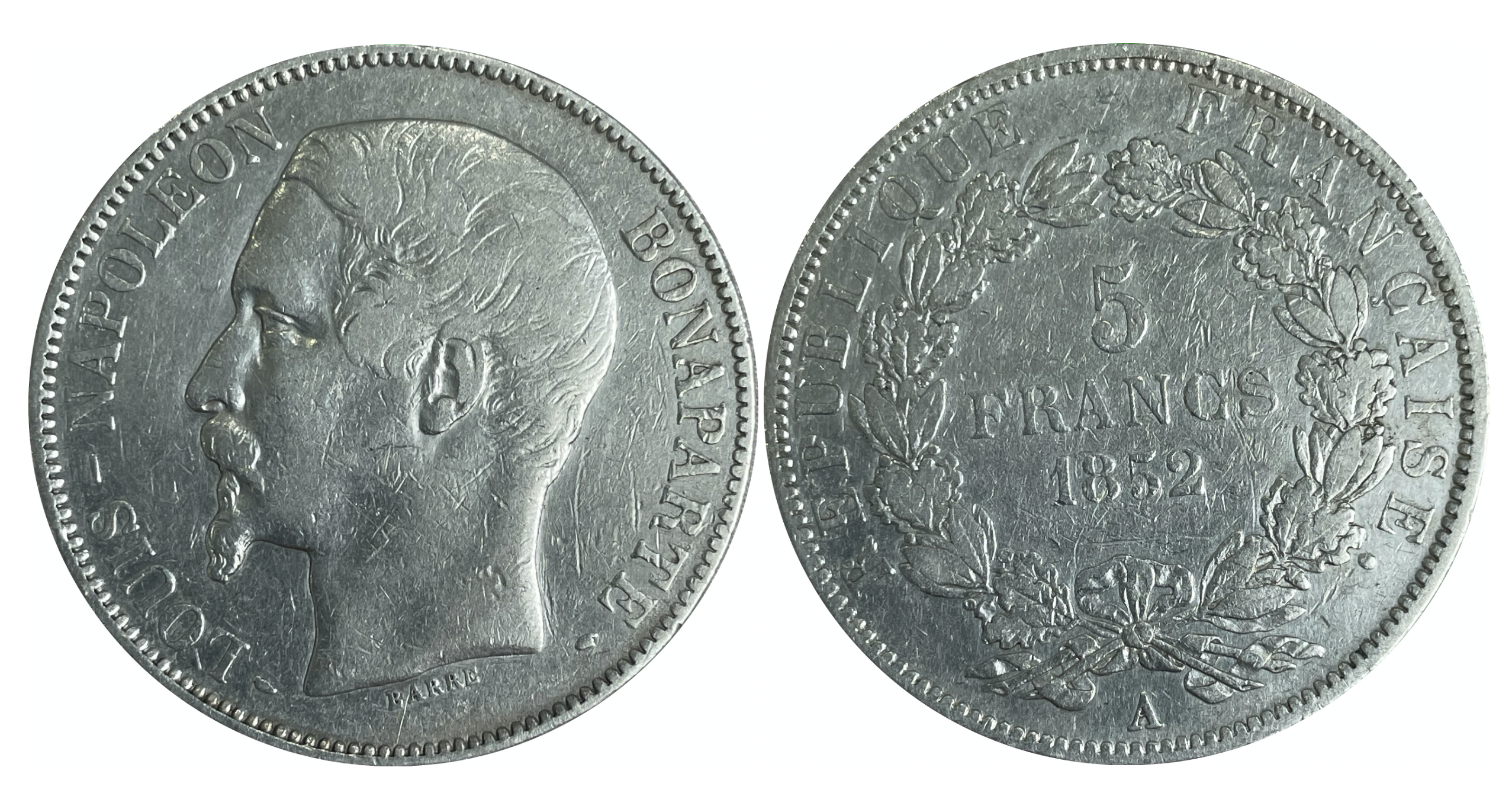
Silver coin: 5 franc, 1852, Under Louis-Napoléon Bonaparte as president

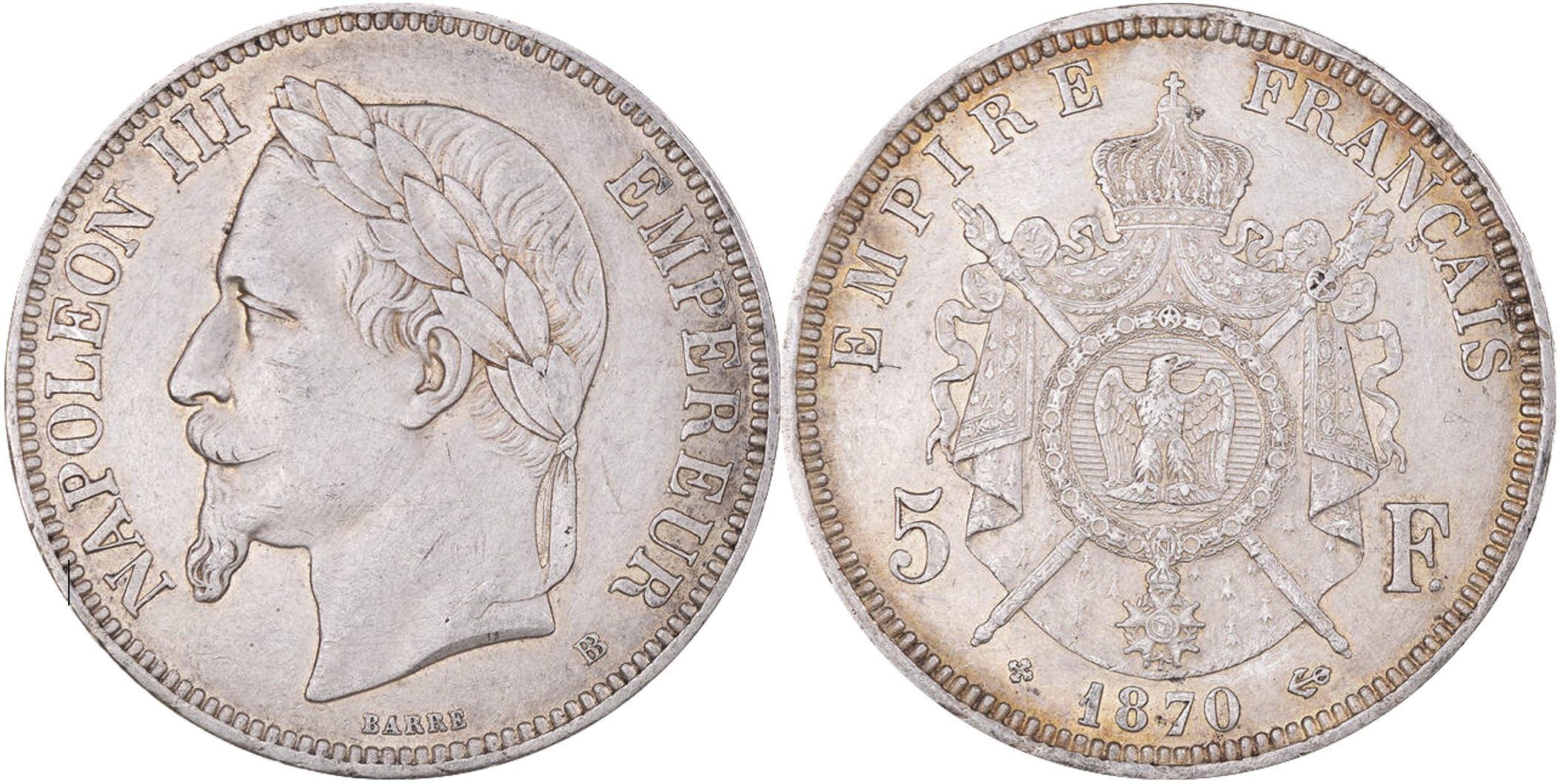
Silver coin: 5 franc, 1870, Under Emperor Napoleon III

The new constitution of the Second Republic, drafted by a commission including Alexis de Tocqueville, called for a strong executive and a president elected by popular vote through universal male suffrage, rather than chosen by the National Assembly. The elections were scheduled for 10–11 December 1848. Louis Napoleon promptly announced his candidacy. There were four other candidates for the post: General Cavaignac, who had led the suppression of the June uprisings in Paris; Lamartine, the poet-philosopher and leader of the provisional government; Alexandre Auguste Ledru-Rollin, the leader of the socialists; and Raspail, the leader of the far left wing of the socialists.

Louis Napoleon established his campaign headquarters and residence at the Hôtel du Rhin on Place Vendôme. He was accompanied by his companion, Harriet Howard, who gave him a large loan to help finance his campaign. He rarely went to the sessions of the National Assembly and rarely voted. He was not a gifted orator; he spoke slowly, in a monotone, with a slight German accent from his Swiss education. His opponents sometimes ridiculed him, one comparing him to "a turkey who believes he's an eagle".

Louis Napoleon's campaign appealed to both the left and right. His election manifesto proclaimed his support for "religion, family, property, the eternal basis of all social order". But it also announced his intent "to give work to those unoccupied; to look out for the old age of the workers; to introduce in industrial laws those improvements which do not ruin the rich, but which bring about the well-being of each and the prosperity of all".

Louis Napoleon's campaign agents, many of them veterans from Napoleon Bonaparte's army, raised support for him around the country. Louis Napoleon won the grudging endorsement of the conservative leader Adolphe Thiers, who believed he could be the most easily controlled; Thiers called him "of all the candidates, the least bad". He won the backing of L'Evenement, the newspaper of Victor Hugo, which declared, "We have confidence in him; he carries a great name." His chief opponent, General Cavaignac, expected that Louis Napoleon would come in first, but that he would receive less than fifty percent of the vote, which would mean the election would go to the National Assembly, where Cavaignac was certain to win.

The elections were held on 10–11 December. Results were announced on 20 December. Louis Napoleon was widely expected to win, but the size of his victory surprised almost everyone. He won 5,572,834 votes, or 74.2 percent of votes cast, compared with 1,469,156 for Cavaignac. The socialist Ledru-Rollin received 376,834; the extreme left candidate Raspail 37,106, and the poet Lamartine only 17,000 votes. Louis Napoleon won the support of all segments of the population: the peasants unhappy with rising prices and high taxes; unemployed workers; small businessmen who wanted prosperity and order; and intellectuals such as Victor Hugo. He won the votes of 55.6 percent of all registered voters, and won in all but four of France's departments.

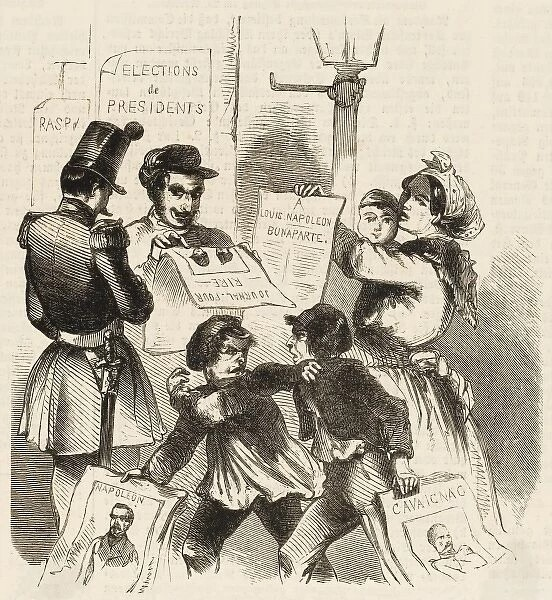
The 1848 presidential campaign pitted Louis Napoleon against General Cavaignac, the Minister of Defense of the Provisional Government, and the leaders of the socialists.

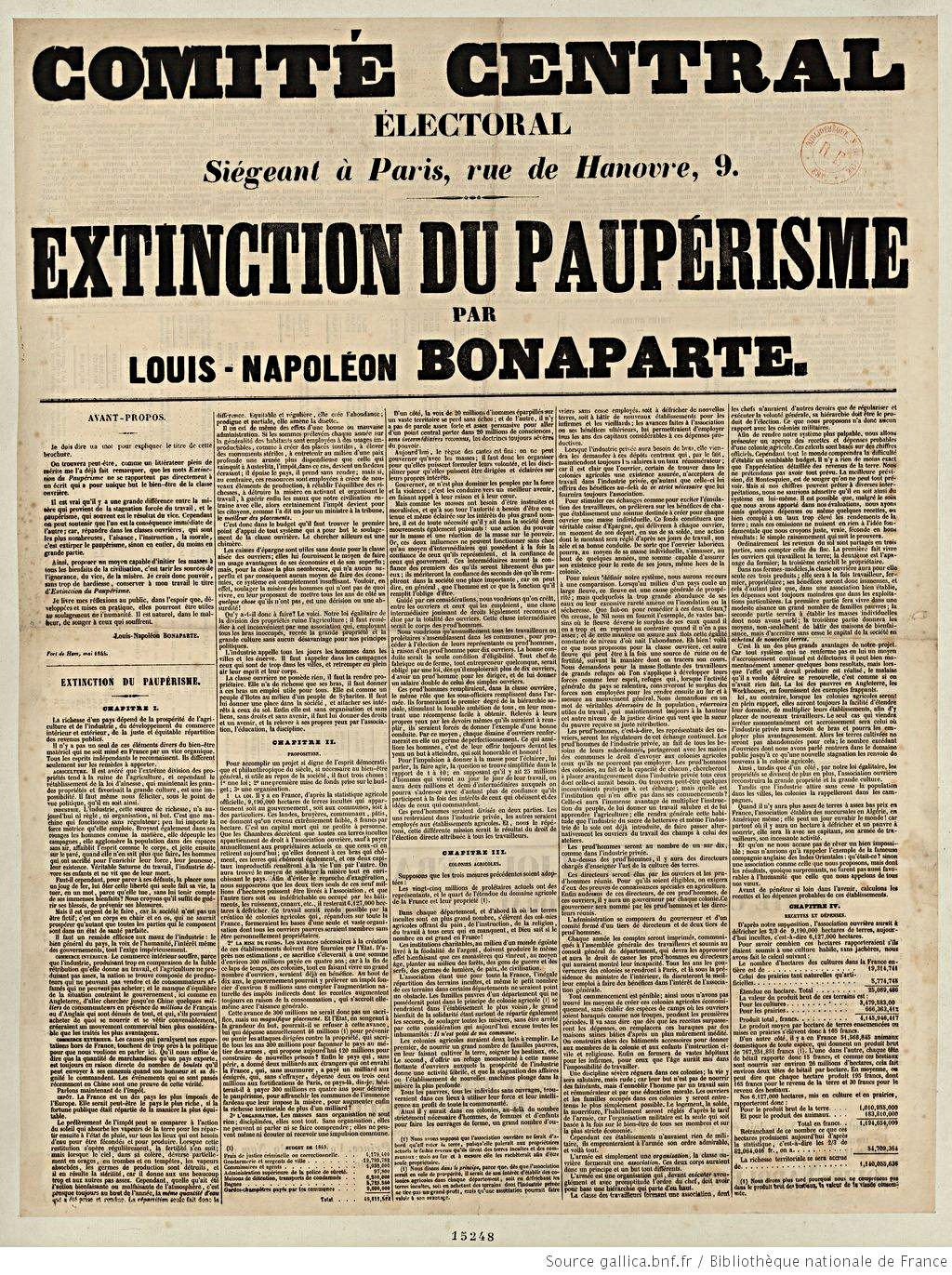
Louis Napoleon's essay, "The Extinction of Pauperism", advocating reforms to help the working class, was widely circulated during the 1848 election campaign.

=== Prince-President (1848–1851) ===
Louis Napoleon moved his residence to the Élysée Palace at the end of December 1848 and immediately hung a portrait of his mother in the boudoir and a portrait of Napoleon I, in his coronation robes, in the grand salon. Adolphe Thiers recommended that he wear clothing of "democratic simplicity", but following the model of his uncle, he chose instead the uniform of the General-in-Chief of the National Guard, and chose the title of "Prince-President".

Louis Napoleon also made his first venture into foreign policy, in Italy, where as a youth he had joined in the patriotic uprising against the Austrians. The previous government had sent an expeditionary force, which had been tasked and funded by the National Assembly to support the republican forces in Italy against the Austrians and against the Pope. Instead the force was secretly ordered to do the opposite, namely to enter Rome to help restore the temporal authority of Pope Pius IX, who had been overthrown by Italian republicans including Mazzini and Garibaldi. The French troops came under fire from Garibaldi's soldiers. The Prince-President, without consulting his ministers, ordered his soldiers to fight if needed in support of the Pope. This was very popular with French Catholics, but infuriated the republicans, who supported the Roman Republic.

To please the radical republicans, he asked the Pope to introduce liberal reforms and the Code Napoleon to the Papal States. To gain support from the Catholics, he approved the Loi Falloux in 1851, which restored a greater role for the Catholic Church in the French educational system.

Elections were held for the National Assembly on 13–14 May 1849, only a few months after Louis Napoleon had become president, and were largely won by a coalition of conservative republicans—which Catholics and monarchists called "The Party of Order"—led by Thiers. The socialists and "red" republicans, led by Ledru-Rollin and Raspail, also did well, winning two hundred seats. The moderate republicans, in the middle, did very badly, taking just 70–80 seats. The Party of Order had a clear majority, enough to block any initiatives of Louis Napoleon.

On 11 June 1849, the socialists and radical republicans made an attempt to seize power. Ledru-Rollin, from his headquarters in the Conservatory of Arts and Professions, declared that Louis Napoleon was no longer President and called for a general uprising. A few barricades appeared in the working-class neighborhoods of Paris. Louis Napoleon acted swiftly, and the uprising was short-lived. Paris was declared in a state of siege, the headquarters of the uprising was surrounded, and the leaders arrested. Ledru-Rollin fled to England, Raspail was arrested and sent to prison, the republican clubs were closed, and their newspapers closed down.

The National Assembly, now without the left republicans and determined to keep them out forever, proposed a new election law that placed restrictions on universal male suffrage, imposing a three-year residency requirement. This new law excluded 3.5 of 9 million French voters, the voters that the leader of the Party of Order, Adolphe Thiers, scornfully called "the vile multitude". This new election law was passed in May 1850 by a majority of 433 to 241, putting the National Assembly on a direct collision course with the Prince-President. Louis Napoleon broke with the Assembly and the conservative ministers opposing his projects in favour of the dispossessed. He secured the support of the army, toured the country making populist speeches that condemned the Assembly, and presented himself as the protector of universal male suffrage. He demanded that the law be changed, but his proposal was defeated in the Assembly by a vote of 355 to 348.

According to the Constitution of 1848, Louis Napoleon had to step down at the end of his term. He sought a constitutional amendment to allow him to succeed himself, arguing that four years were not enough to fully implement his political and economic program. He toured the country and gained support from many of the regional governments and many within the Assembly. The vote in July 1851 was 446 to 278 in favor of changing the law and allowing him to run again, but this was short of the two-thirds majority needed to amend the constitution.

=== Coup d'état (December 1851) ===
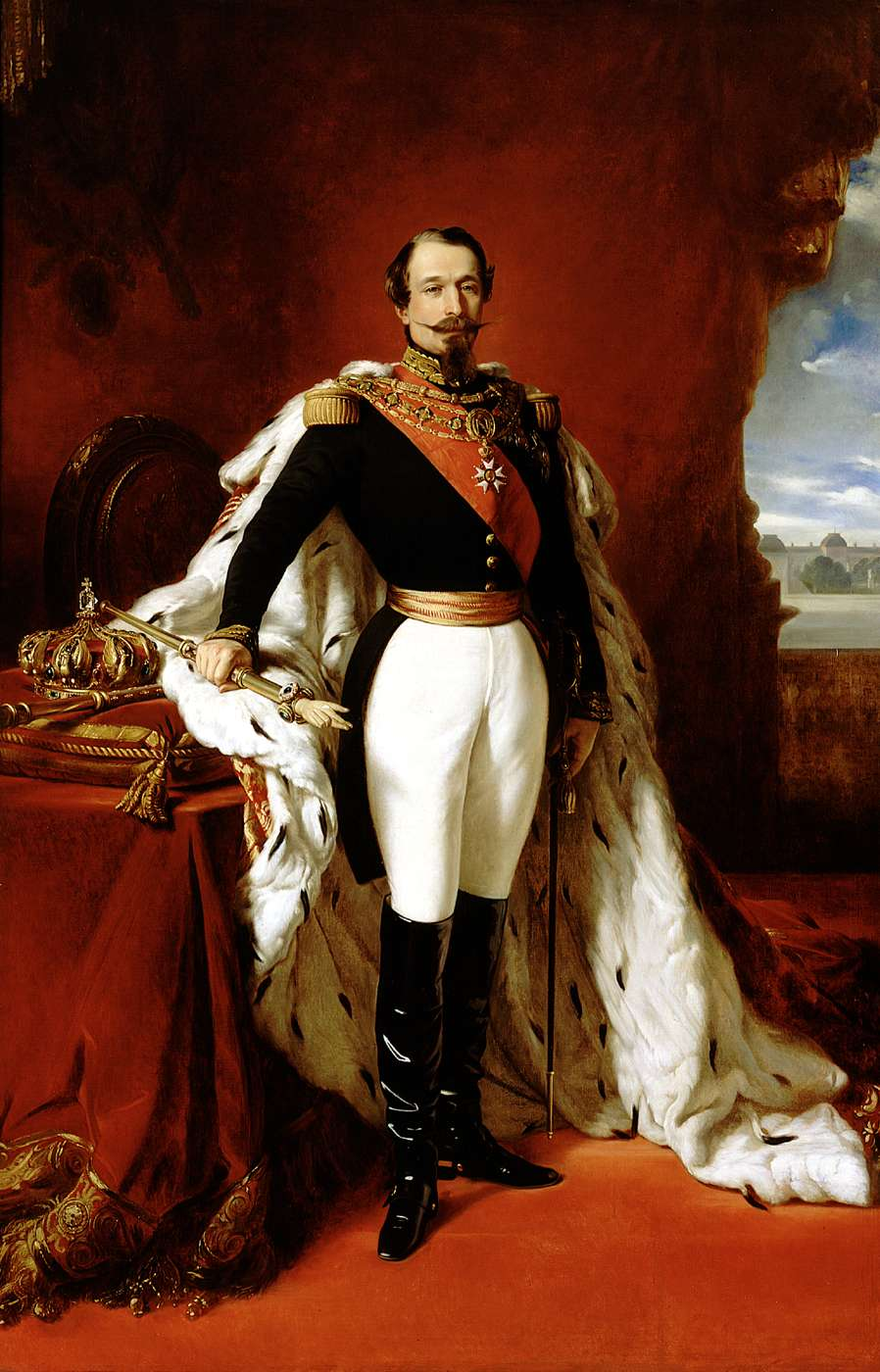
Portrait of Napoleon III in 1853 (by Franz Xaver Winterhalter)

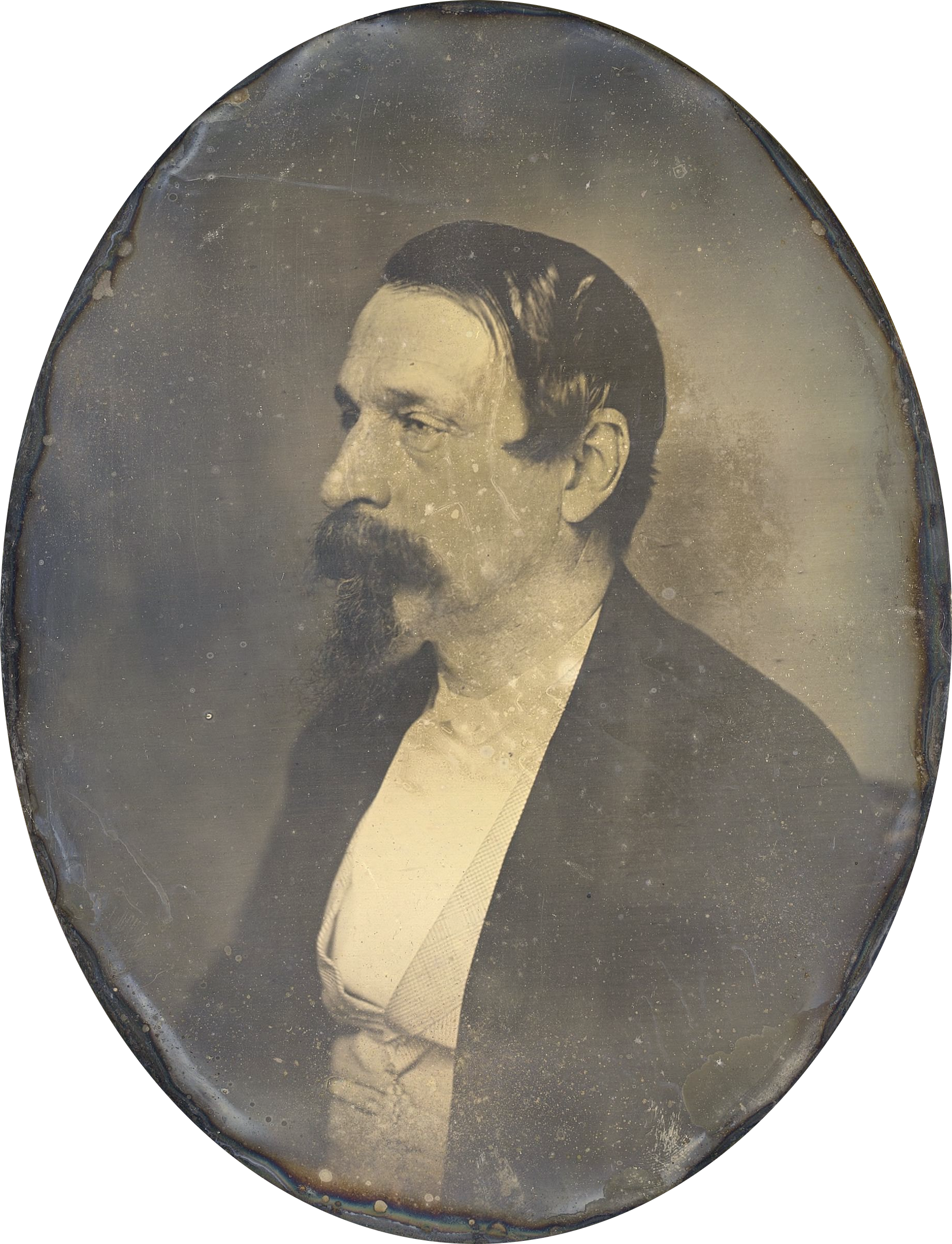
Daguerreotype of Napoleon III c. 1850–1855

Louis Napoleon believed that he was supported by the people and he chose to retain power by other means. His half-brother Charles, duc de Morny, and a few close advisors quietly began to organize a coup d'état. They included minister of war Jacques Leroy de Saint Arnaud and officers from the French Army in North Africa to provide military backing for the coup. On the night of 1–2 December, Saint Arnaud's soldiers quietly occupied the national printing office, the Palais Bourbon, newspaper offices, and the strategic points in the city. In the morning, Parisians found posters around the city announcing the dissolution of the National Assembly, the restoration of universal suffrage, new elections, and a state of siege in Paris and the surrounding departments. Sixteen members of the National Assembly were arrested in their homes. When about 220 deputies of the moderate right gathered at the city hall of the 10th arrondissement, they were also arrested. On 3 December, writer Victor Hugo and a few other republicans tried to organize an opposition to the coup. A few barricades appeared, and about 1,000 insurgents came out in the streets, but the army moved in force with 30,000 troops and the uprisings were swiftly crushed, with the killing of an estimated 300 to 400 opponents of the coup. There were also small uprisings in the more militant red republican towns in the south and center of France, but these were all put down by 10 December.

Louis Napoleon followed the self-coup by a period of repression of his opponents, aimed mostly at the red republicans. About 26,000 people were arrested, including 4,000 in Paris alone. The 239 inmates who were judged most severely were sent to the penal colony in Cayenne. 9,530 followers were sent to French Algeria, 1,500 were expelled from France, and another 3,000 were given forced residence away from their homes. Soon afterwards, a commission of revision freed 3,500 of those sentenced. In 1859, the remaining 1,800 prisoners and exiles were amnestied, with the exception of the republican leader Ledru-Rollin, who was released from prison but required to leave the country.

Strict press censorship was enacted by a decree from 17 February 1852. No newspaper dealing with political or social questions could be published without the permission of the government, fines were increased, and the list of press offenses was expanded. After three warnings, a newspaper or journal could be suspended or even permanently closed.

Louis Napoleon wished to demonstrate that his new government had a broad popular mandate, so on 20–21 December a national plebiscite was held asking if voters agreed to the coup. Mayors in many regions threatened to publish the names of any electors who refused to vote. When asked if they agreed to the coup, 7,439,216 voters said yes, 641,737 voted no, and 1.7 million voters abstained. The fairness and legality of the referendum was immediately questioned by Louis Napoleon's critics, but Louis Napoleon was convinced that he had been given a public mandate to rule.

Following the returns, many challenged the validity of such an implausibly lopsided result. One such critic was Victor Hugo, who had originally supported Louis Napoleon but had been infuriated by the coup d'état, departed for Brussels on 11 December 1851. He became the most bitter critic of Louis Napoleon, rejected the amnesty offered to him, and did not return to France for twenty years.

== The Second French Empire ==
=== Middle years ===
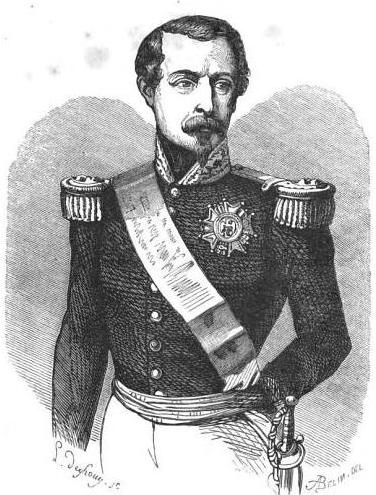
The Prince-President in 1852, after the coup d'état

The 1851 referendum gave Louis Napoleon a mandate to amend the constitution. Work began on the new document in 1852. It was officially prepared by a committee of eighty experts but was actually drafted by a small group of the Prince-President's inner circle. Under the new constitution, Louis Napoleon was automatically reelected as president. Under Article Two, the president could now serve an unlimited number of 10-year terms. He was given the absolute authority to declare war, sign treaties, form alliances and initiate laws. The Constitution re-established universal male suffrage, and also retained a National Assembly, albeit one with reduced authority.

Louis Napoleon's government imposed new authoritarian measures to control dissent and reduce the power of the opposition. One of his first acts was to settle scores with his old enemy, King Louis Philippe, who had sent him to prison for life and who had died in 1850. A decree on 23 January 1852 forbade the late king's family to own property in France and annulled the inheritance he had given to his children before he became king.

The National Guard, whose members had sometimes joined anti-government demonstrations, was re-organized and largely used only in parades. Government officials were required to wear uniforms at official formal occasions. The Minister of Education was given the power to dismiss professors at the universities and review the content of their courses. Students at the universities were forbidden to wear beards, seen as a symbol of republicanism.

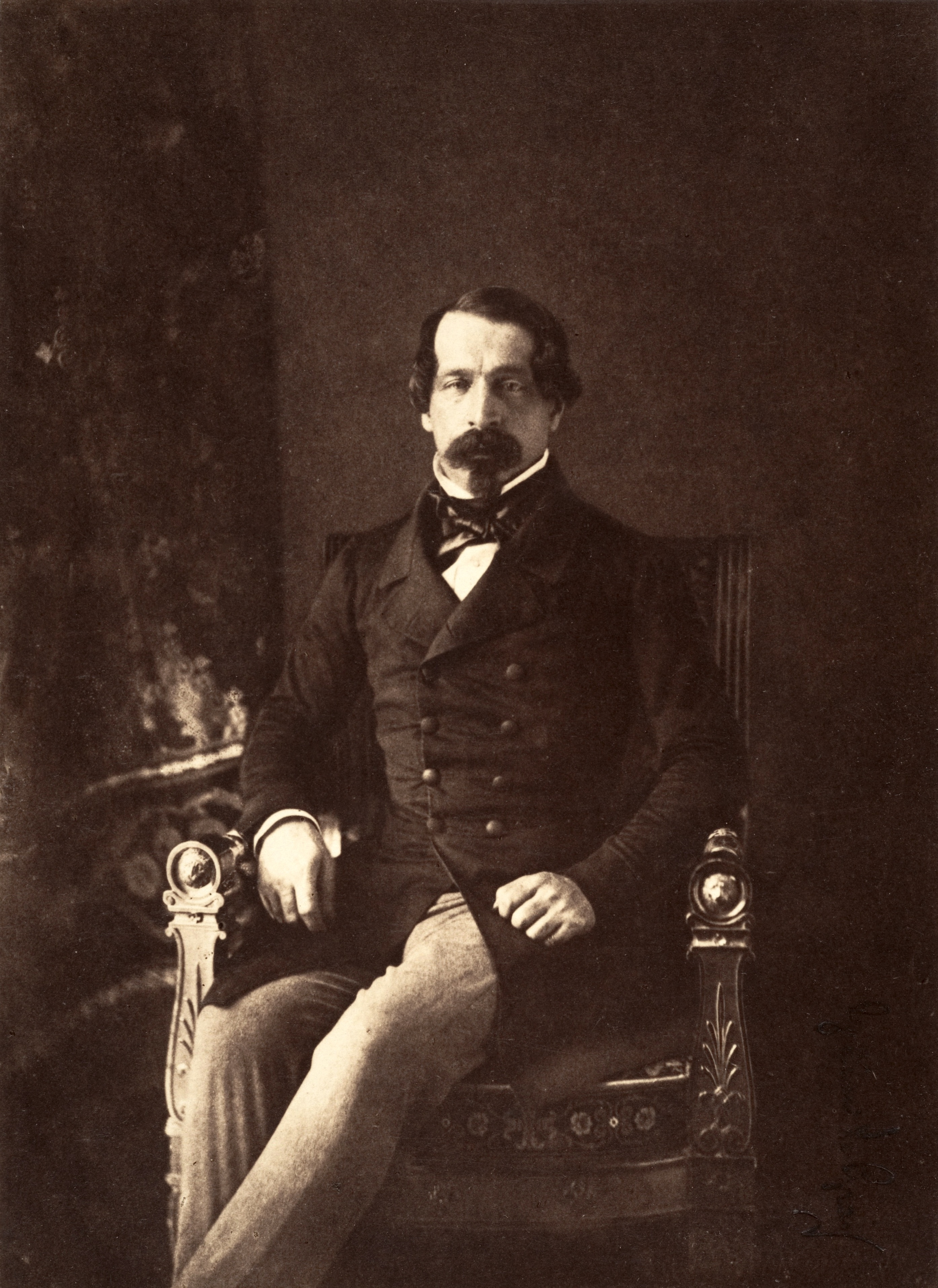
Photograph of Louis Napoleon (1852) by Gustave Le Gray

An election was held for a new National Assembly on 29 February 1852. All resources of the government were used on behalf of the candidates backing the Prince-President. Of eight million eligible voters, 5,200,000 votes went to the official candidates and 800,000 to opposition candidates. About one third of the eligible voters abstained. The new Assembly included a small number of opponents of Louis Napoleon, including 17 monarchists, 18 conservatives, two liberal democrats, three republicans and 72 independents.

Despite now holding all governing power in the nation, Louis Napoleon was not content with being an authoritarian president. The ink had barely dried on his new, severely authoritarian constitution when he set about restoring the empire. Following the election, the Prince-President went on a triumphal national tour. In Marseille, he laid the cornerstone of a new cathedral, a new stock exchange, and a chamber of commerce. In Bordeaux, on 9 October 1852, he gave his principal speech:

Some people say the Empire is war. I say the Empire is peace. Like the Emperor I have many conquests to make... Like him I wish ... to draw into the stream of the great popular river those hostile side-currents which lose themselves without profit to anyone. We have immense unplowed territories to cultivate; roads to open; ports to dig; rivers to be made navigable; canals to finish, a railway network to complete. We have, in front of Marseille, a vast kingdom to assimilate into France. We have all the great ports of the west to connect with the American continent by modern communications, which we still lack. We have ruins to repair, false gods to tear down, truths which we need to make triumph. This is how I see the Empire, if the Empire is re-established. These are the conquests I am considering, and you around me, who, like me, want the good of our country, you are my soldiers.

Édouard Drouyn de Lhuys, twice foreign minister to Napoleon III, later commented that, "the Emperor has immense desires and limited abilities. He wants to do extraordinary things but is only capable of extravagances."

When Louis Napoleon returned to Paris the city was decorated with large arches, with banners proclaiming, "To Napoleon III, emperor". In response to officially inspired requests for the return of the empire, the Senate scheduled another referendum for 21–22 November 1852 on whether to make Louis Napoleon emperor. After an implausible 97 percent voted in favour (7,824,129 votes for and 253,159 against, with two million abstentions), on 2 December 1852—exactly one year after the coup—the Second Republic was officially ended, replaced by the Second French Empire. Prince-President Louis Napoleon Bonaparte became Napoleon III, Emperor of the French. His regnal name treats Napoleon II, who never actually ruled, as a true Emperor (he had been briefly recognized as emperor from 22 June to 7 July 1815). The 1852 constitution was retained; it concentrated so much power in Napoleon's hands that the only substantive changes were to replace the word "president" with the word "emperor", and make the post hereditary.

=== Modernising the infrastructure and the economy (1853–1869) ===
==== Early construction ====
One of the first priorities of Napoleon III was the modernisation of the French economy, which had fallen far behind that of the United Kingdom and some of the German states. Political economics had long been a passion of the Emperor. While in Britain, he had visited factories and railway yards; in prison, he had studied and written about the sugar industry and policies to reduce poverty. He wanted the government to play an active, not a passive, role in the economy. In 1839, he had written: "Government is not a necessary evil, as some people claim; it is instead the benevolent motor for the whole social organism." He did not advocate the government getting directly involved in industry. Instead, the government took a very active role in building the infrastructure for economic growth; stimulating the stock market and investment banks to provide credit; building railways, ports, canals and roads; and providing training and education. He also opened up French markets to foreign goods, such as railway tracks from England, forcing French industry to become more efficient and more competitive.

The period was favorable for industrial expansion. The gold rushes in California and Australia increased the European money supply. In the early years of the Empire, the economy also benefited from the coming of age of those born during the baby boom of the Restoration period. The steady rise of prices caused by the increase of the money supply encouraged company promotion and investment of capital.

Beginning in 1852, Napoleon encouraged the creation of new banks, such as Crédit Mobilier, which sold shares to the public and provided loans to both private industry and to the government. Crédit Lyonnais was founded in 1863 and Société Générale in 1864. These banks provided the funding for Napoleon III's major projects, from railway and canals to the rebuilding of Paris.

In 1851, France had only 3,500 kilometers of railway, compared with 10,000 kilometers in England and 800 kilometers in Belgium, a country one-twentieth the size of France. Within days of the coup d'état of 1851, Napoleon's Minister of Public Works launched a project to build a railway line around Paris, connecting the different independent lines coming into Paris from around the country. The government provided guarantees for loans to build new lines and urged railway companies to consolidate. There were 18 railway companies in 1848 and six at the end of the Empire. By 1870, France had 20,000 kilometers of railway linked to the French ports and to the railway systems of the neighbouring countries that carried over 100 million passengers a year and transported the products of France's new steel mills, mines and factories.

==== Development of steamships and early reconstruction on Paris ====
New shipping lines were created, and ports rebuilt in Marseille and Le Havre, which connected France by sea to the US, Latin America, North Africa and the Far East. During the Empire, the number of steamships tripled, and by 1870, France possessed the second-largest maritime fleet in the world after England. Napoleon III backed the greatest maritime project of the age, the construction of the Suez Canal between 1859 and 1869. The canal project was funded by shares on the Paris stock market and led by a former French diplomat, Ferdinand de Lesseps. It was opened by Empress Eugénie with a performance of Verdi's opera Aida.

The rebuilding of central Paris also encouraged commercial expansion and innovation. The first department store, Bon Marché, opened in Paris in 1852 in a modest building and expanded rapidly, its income increasing from 450,000 francs a year to 20 million. Its founder, Aristide Boucicaut, commissioned a new glass and iron building designed by Louis-Charles Boileau and Gustave Eiffel that opened in 1869 and became the model for the modern department store. Other department stores quickly appeared: Au Printemps in 1865 and La Samaritaine in 1870. They were soon imitated around the world.

Napoleon's program also included reclaiming farmland and reforestation. One such project in the Gironde department drained and reforested 10,000 square kilometers (3,900 square miles) of moorland, creating the Landes forest, the largest maritime pine forest in Europe.

=== Reconstruction of Paris (1854–1870) ===
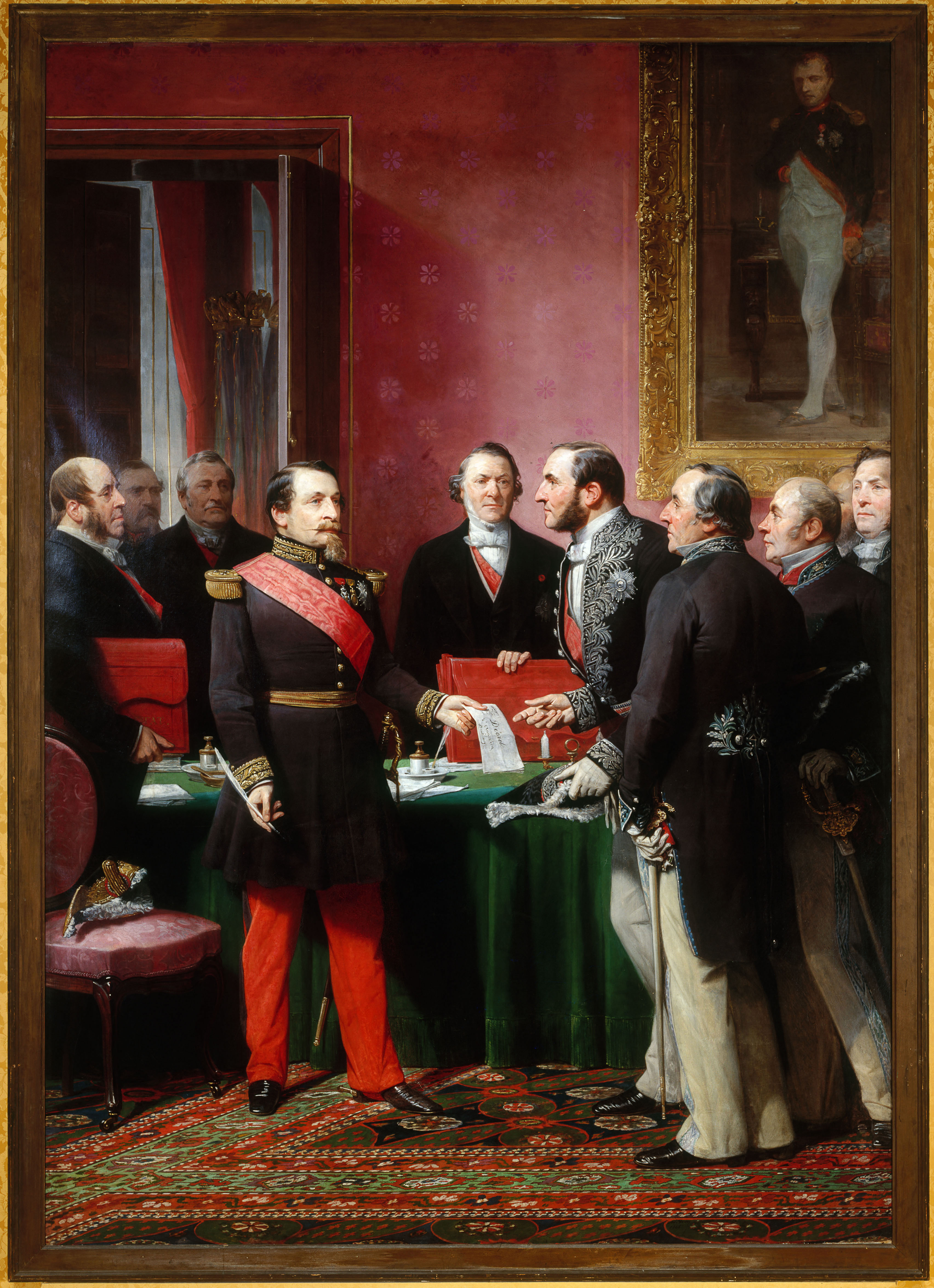
Georges-Eugène Haussmann and Napoleon III make official the annexation of eleven communes around Paris to the city. The annexation increased the size of the city from twelve to the present twenty arrondissements.

Napoleon III began his regime by launching a series of enormous public works projects in Paris, hiring tens of thousands of workers to improve the sanitation, water supply and traffic circulation of the city. To direct this task, he named a new prefect of the Seine department, Georges-Eugène Haussmann, and gave him extraordinary powers to rebuild the center of the city. He installed a large map of Paris in a central position in his office, and he and Haussmann planned the new Paris. Napoleon III had envisioned a reconstruction of Paris for years; writing in 1842, he declared "I want to be a second Augustus, because Augustus [...] made Rome a city of marble."

The population of Paris had doubled since 1815, with neither an increase in its area nor a development of its structure of very narrow medieval streets and alleys.

To accommodate the growing population and those who would be forced from the center by the construction of new boulevards and squares, Napoleon issued a decree in 1860 to annex eleven communes (municipalities) on the outskirts of Paris and increase the number of arrondissements (city boroughs) from twelve to twenty. Paris was thus enlarged to its modern boundaries with the exception of the two major city parks (Bois de Boulogne and Bois de Vincennes) that became part of the French capital in 1920.

For the duration of Napoleon III's reign and a decade afterwards, most of Paris was an enormous construction site. His hydraulic chief engineer, Eugène Belgrand, built a new aqueduct to bring clean water from the Vanne River in the Champagne region, and a new huge reservoir near the future Parc Montsouris. These two works increased the water supply of Paris from 87,000 to 400,000 cubic meters of water a day. Hundreds of kilometers of pipes distributed the water throughout the city, and a second network, using the less-clean water from the Ourcq and the Seine, washed the streets and watered the new park and gardens. He completely rebuilt the Paris sewers and installed miles of pipes to distribute gas for thousands of new streetlights along the Paris streets.

Beginning in 1854, in the center of the city, Haussmann's workers tore down hundreds of old buildings and constructed new avenues to connect the central points of the city. Buildings along these avenues were required to be the same height, constructed in an architecturally similar style, and be faced with cream-coloured stone to create the signature look of Paris boulevards.

The emperor built two new railway stations: the Gare de Lyon (1855) and the Gare du Nord (1865). He completed Les Halles, the great cast iron and glass pavilioned produce market in the center of the city, and built a new municipal hospital, the Hôtel-Dieu, in the place of crumbling medieval buildings on the Ile de la Cité. The signature architectural landmark was the Paris Opera, the largest theater in the world, designed by Charles Garnier to crown the center of Napoleon's new Paris.

Napoleon also wanted to build new parks and gardens for the recreation and relaxation of the Parisians, particularly those in the new neighbourhoods of the expanding city. Napoleon's new parks were inspired by his memories of the parks in London, especially Hyde Park, where he had strolled and promenaded in a carriage while in exile; but he wanted to build on a much larger scale. Working with Haussmann and Jean-Charles Adolphe Alphand, the engineer who headed the new Service of Promenades and Plantations, he laid out a plan for four major parks at the cardinal points of the compass around the city. Thousands of workers and gardeners began to dig lakes, build cascades, plant lawns, flowerbeds and trees, and construct chalets and grottoes. Napoleon III transformed the Bois de Boulogne into a park to the west of Paris. To the east, he created the Bois de Vincennes, and to the north, the Parc des Buttes-Chaumont. The Parc Montsouris was created to the south.

In addition to building the four large parks, Napoleon had the city's older parks, including the Parc Monceau, formerly owned by the Orléans family, and the Jardin du Luxembourg, refurbished and replanted. He also created some twenty small parks and gardens in the neighbourhoods as miniature versions of his large parks. Alphand termed these small parks "green and flowering salons". The intention of Napoleon's plan was to have one park in each of the eighty "quartiers" (neighbourhoods) of Paris, so that no one was more than a ten-minute walk from such a park. The parks were an immediate success with all classes of Parisians.

=== Search for a wife ===
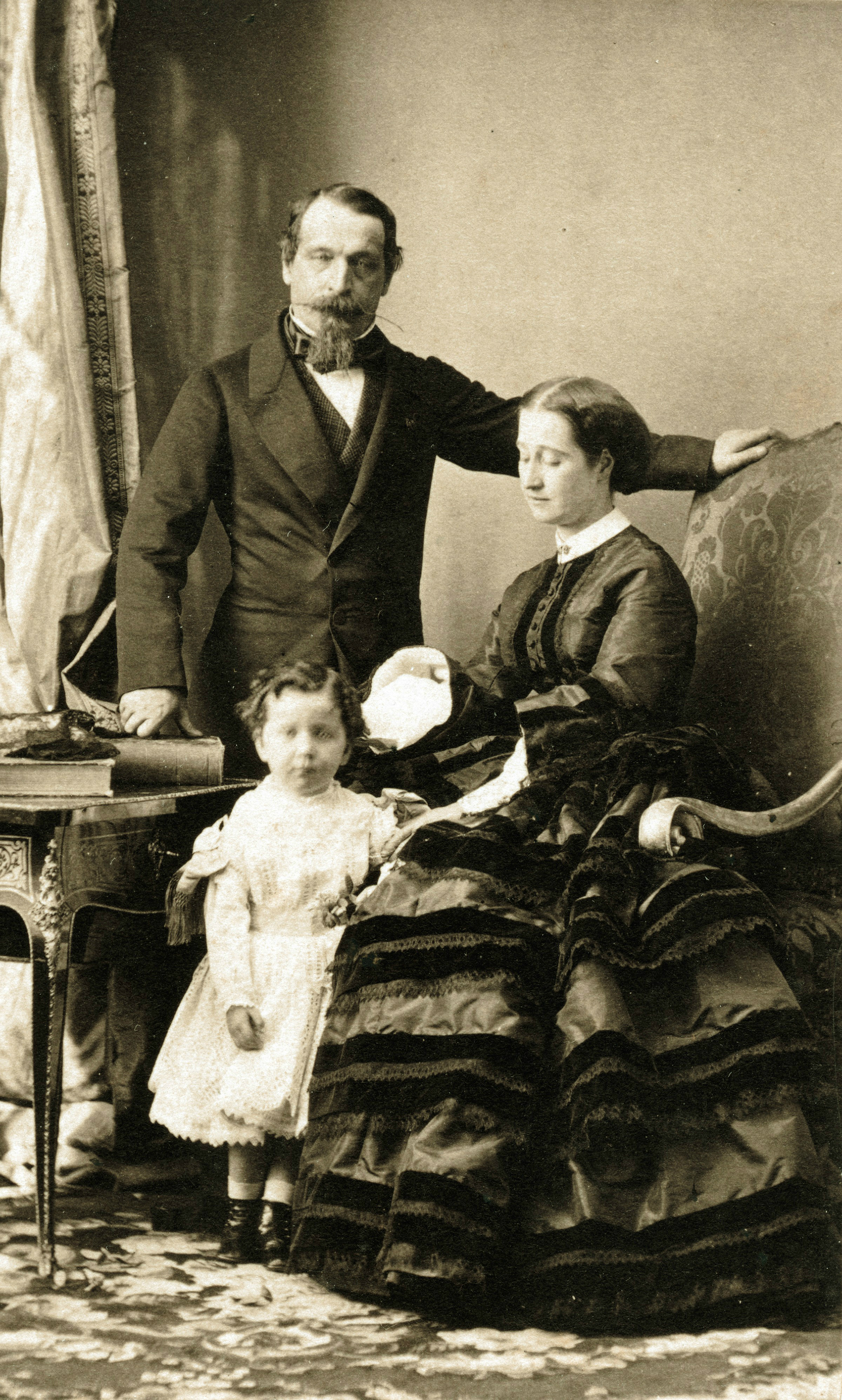
Napoleon III and Empress Eugénie with their young son Louis-Napoléon, Prince Imperial

Soon after becoming emperor, Napoleon III began searching for a wife to give him an heir. He was still attached to his companion Harriet Howard, who attended receptions at the Élysée Palace and traveled around France with him. He quietly sent a diplomatic delegation to approach the family of Princess Carola of Vasa, the granddaughter of deposed King Gustav IV Adolf of Sweden. They declined because of his Catholic religion and the political uncertainty about his future, as did the family of Princess Adelheid of Hohenlohe-Langenburg, a niece of Queen Victoria.

The Emperor fell in love with a 23-year-old Spaniard noblewoman, Eugénie du Derje de Montijo. She received much of her education in Paris. Her beauty attracted Napoleon III, who, as was his custom, tried to seduce her, but Eugénie told him to wait for marriage. The civil ceremony took place at Tuileries Palace on 22 January 1853, and a much grander ceremony was held a few days later at the Cathedral of Notre-Dame de Paris. In 1856, Eugénie gave birth to a son and heir-apparent, Napoléon, Prince Imperial.

With an heir to the throne secured, Napoleon resumed his "petites distractions" with other women. Eugénie faithfully performed the duties of an empress, entertaining guests and accompanying the Emperor to balls, opera, and theatre. She traveled to Egypt to open the Suez Canal and officially represented him whenever he traveled outside France.

Though a fervent Catholic and conservative on many other issues, Eugénie strongly advocated equality for women. She pressured the Ministry of National Education to give the first baccalaureate diploma to a woman and tried unsuccessfully to induce the Académie française to elect the writer George Sand as its first female member.

== Foreign policy (1852–1860) ==
In foreign policy, Napoleon III aimed to reassert French influence in Europe and around the world as a supporter of popular sovereignty and nationalism. In Europe, he allied himself with Britain and defeated Russia in the Crimean War (1854–1856). French troops assisted Italian unification by fighting on the side of the Kingdom of Sardinia. In return, France received Savoy and the county of Nice in 1860. Later, however, to appease fervent French Catholics, he sent soldiers to defend the residual Papal States against annexation by Italy.

=== Principle of Nationalities ===
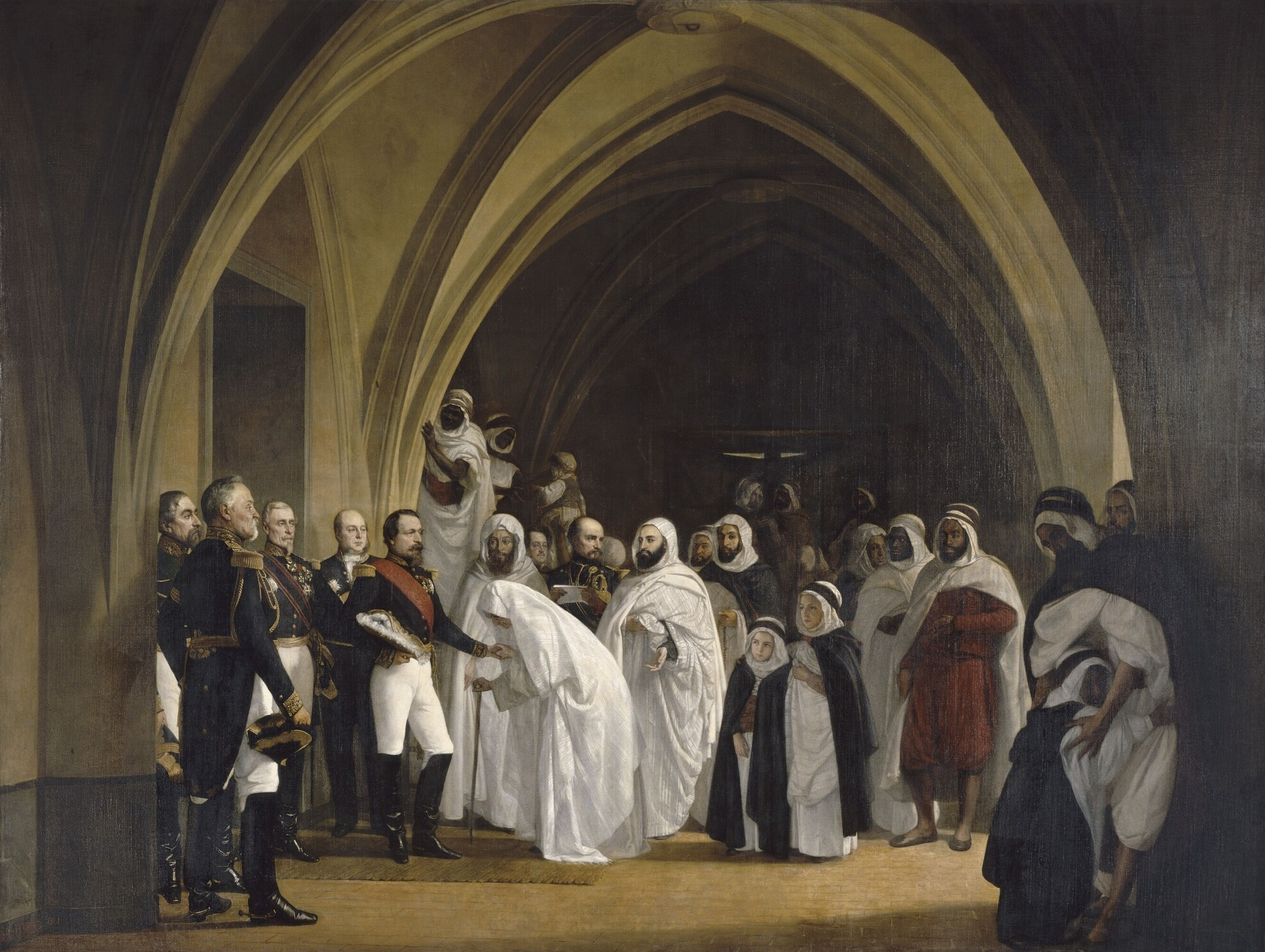
Napoleon III and Abdelkader El Djezairi, the Algerian military leader who led a struggle against the French invasion of Algeria

In a speech at Bordeaux shortly after becoming Emperor, Napoleon III proclaimed that "The Empire means peace" ("L'Empire, c'est la paix"), reassuring foreign governments that he would not attack other European powers in order to extend the French Empire. He was, however, determined to follow a strong foreign policy to extend France's influence and warned that he would not stand by and allow another European power to threaten its neighbour.

At the beginning of his reign, he was also an advocate of a new "principle of nationalities" (principe des nationalités) that supported the creation of new states based on nationality, such as Italy, in place of the old multinational empires, such as the Habsburg monarchy (or Empire of Austria, known since 1867 as Austria-Hungary). In this he was influenced by his uncle's policy as described in the Mémorial de Sainte-Hélène. In all of his foreign policy ventures, he put the interests of France first. Napoleon III felt that new states created on the basis of national identity would become natural allies and partners of France.

=== Alliance with Britain and the Crimean War (1853–1856) ===
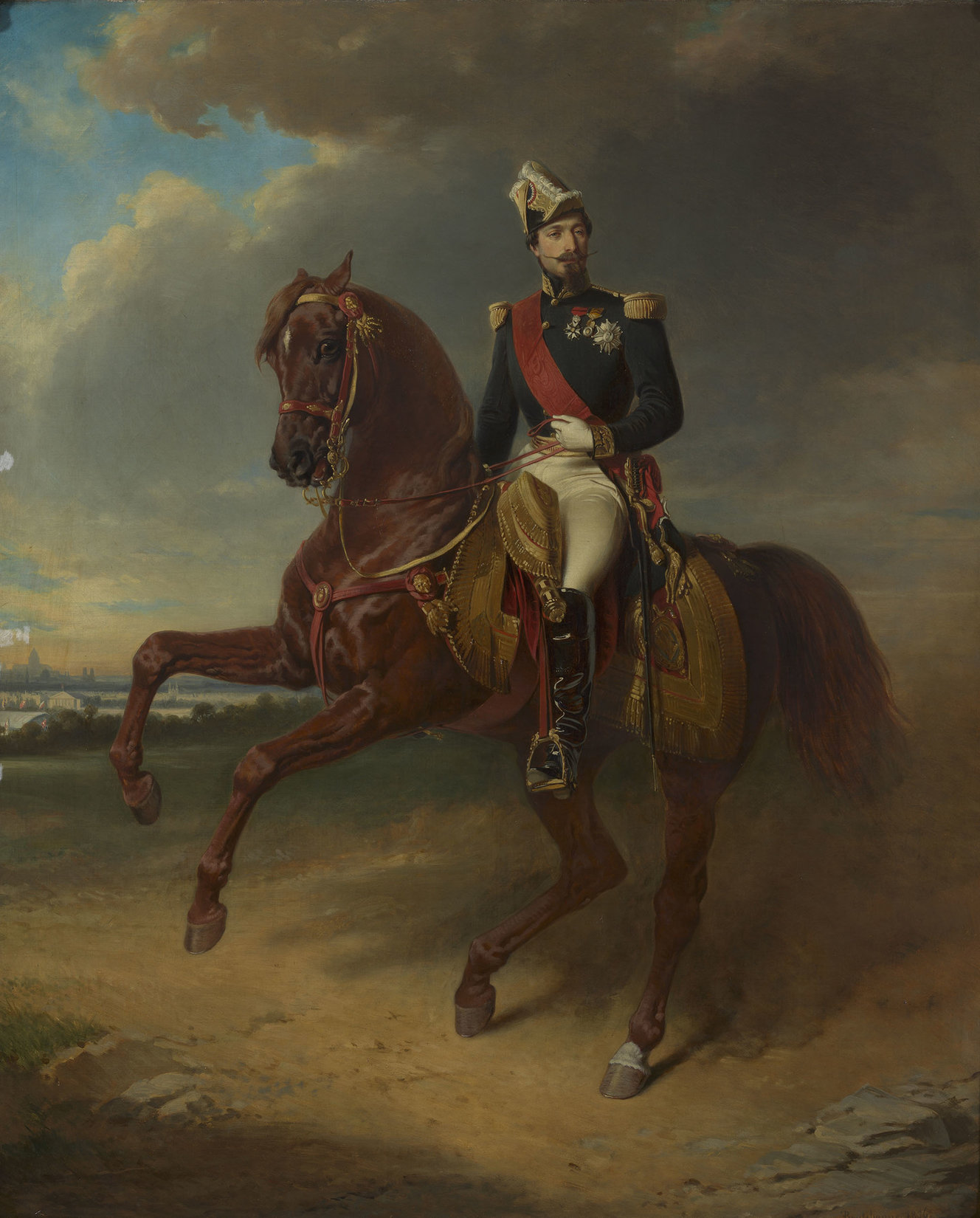
Portrait of Napoleon III in military uniform in 1855, during the Crimean War

Lord Palmerston as Britain's Foreign Secretary and later Prime Minister had close personal ties with leading French statesmen, notably Napoleon III himself. Palmerston's goal was to arrange peaceful relations with France in order to free Britain's diplomatic hand elsewhere in the world. Napoleon at first had a pro-British foreign policy and was eager not to displease the British government, whose friendship he saw as important to France. After a brief threat of an invasion of Britain in 1851, France and Britain cooperated in the 1850s with an alliance in the Crimean War and a major trade treaty in 1860.

War scares were consistently worked up by the press nonetheless. John Delane, editor of The Times, visited France in January 1853 and was impressed by its military preparedness. He expressed his conviction that "Louis-Napoleon was resolved on a forward foreign policy". Napoleon III was actually determined to increase the country's naval power. The first purpose-built steam-powered battleship (worryingly christened after Napoleon I) was launched in 1850, and the fortification of Cherbourg was strengthened. This led to the extension of the breakwater of Alderney and the construction of Fort Clonque.

From the start of his Empire, Napoleon III sought an alliance with Britain. He had lived there while in exile and saw Britain as a natural partner in the projects he wished to accomplish. An opportunity soon presented itself: In early 1853, Tsar Nicholas I of Russia put pressure on the weak Ottoman government, demanding that they give Russia a protectorate over the Christian people of the Balkans as well as control over Constantinople and the Dardanelles. The Ottoman Empire, backed by Britain and France, refused Russia's demands, and a joint British-French fleet was sent to support the Ottoman Empire. When Russia refused to leave the Danubian Principalities it had occupied, Britain and France declared war on 27 March 1854.

It took France and Britain six months to organize a full-scale military expedition to the Black Sea. The Anglo-French fleet landed thirty thousand French and twenty thousand British soldiers in the Crimea on 14 September and began to lay siege to the major Russian port of Sevastopol. As the siege dragged on, the French and British armies were reinforced and troops from the Kingdom of Sardinia joined them, reaching a total of 140,000 soldiers, but they suffered terribly from epidemics of typhus, dysentery, and cholera. During the 332 days of the siege, the French lost 95,000 soldiers, including 75,000 due to disease. The suffering of the army in the Crimea was carefully concealed from the French public by press censorship.

The death of Tsar Nicholas I on 2 March 1855 and his replacement by Alexander II changed the political equation. In September, after a massive bombardment, the Anglo-French army of fifty thousand men stormed the Russian positions, and the Russians were forced to evacuate Sevastopol. Alexander II sought a political solution, and negotiations were held in Paris in the new building of the French Foreign Ministry on the Quai d'Orsay, from 25 February to 8 April 1856.

The Crimean War added three new place names to Paris: Alma, named for the first French victory on the river of that name; Sevastopol; and Malakoff, named for a tower in the center of the Russian line captured by the French. The war had two important diplomatic consequences: Alexander II became an ally of France, and Britain and France were reconciled. In April 1855, Napoleon III and Eugénie went to England and were received by the Queen; in turn, Victoria and Prince Albert visited Paris. Victoria was the first British monarch to do so in centuries.

The defeat of Russia and the alliance with Britain gave France increased authority and prestige in Europe. This was the first war between European powers since the close of the Napoleonic Wars and the Congress of Vienna, marking a breakdown of the alliance system that had maintained peace for nearly half a century. The war also effectively ended the Concert of Europe and the Quadruple Alliance, or "Waterloo Coalition", that the other four powers (Russia, Prussia, Austria, and Great Britain) had established. The Paris Peace Conference of 1856 represented a high-water mark for Napoleon's regime in foreign affairs. It encouraged Napoleon III to make an even bolder foreign policy venture in Italy.

=== Italian Campaign ===
==== Early years ====
On the evening of 14 January 1858, Napoleon and the Empress escaped an assassination attempt unharmed. A group of conspirators threw three bombs at the imperial carriage as it made its way to the opera. Eight members of the escort and bystanders were killed and over one hundred people injured. The culprits were quickly arrested. The leader was an Italian nationalist, Felice Orsini, who was aided by a French surgeon Simon François Bernard. They believed that if Napoleon III were killed, a republican revolt would immediately follow in France and the new republican government would help all Italian states win independence from Austria and achieve national unification. Bernard was in London at the time. Since he was a political exile, the Government of the United Kingdom refused to extradite him, but Orsini was tried, convicted and executed on 13 March 1858. The bombing focused the attention of France and particularly of Napoleon III, on the issue of Italian nationalism.

Part of Italy, particularly the Kingdom of Sardinia, was independent, but central Italy was still ruled by the Pope (in this era, Pope Pius IX), while Lombardy, Venice and much of the north was ruled by Austria. Other states were de jure independent (notably the Duchy of Parma and the Grand Duchy of Tuscany) but de facto fully under Austrian influence. Napoleon III had fought with the Italian patriots against the Austrians when he was young and his sympathy was with them, but the Empress, most of his government and the Catholic Church in France supported the Pope and the existing governments. The British Government was also hostile to the idea of promoting nationalism in Italy. Despite the opposition within his government and in his own palace, Napoleon III did all that he could to support the cause of Piedmont-Sardinia. The King of Piedmont-Sardinia, Victor Emmanuel II, was invited to Paris in November 1855 and given the same royal treatment as Queen Victoria.

Count Cavour, the Prime Minister of Piedmont-Sardinia, came to Paris with the King and employed an unusual emissary in his efforts to win the support of Napoleon III: his young cousin, Virginia Oldoini, Countess of Castiglione (1837–1899). As Cavour had hoped, she caught the Emperor's eye and became his mistress. Between 1855 and 1857, she used the opportunity to pass messages and to plead the Italian cause.

In July 1858, Napoleon arranged a secret visit by Count Cavour. In the Plombières Agreement they agreed to join forces and drive the Austrians from Italy. In exchange, Napoleon III asked for Savoy (the ancestral land of the King of Piedmont-Sardinia) and the then bilingual County of Nice, which had been taken from France after Napoleon's fall in 1815 and returned to Piedmont-Sardinia. Cavour protested that Nice was Italian, but Napoleon responded that "these are secondary questions. There will be time later to discuss them."

Assured of the support of Napoleon III, Count Cavour began to prepare the Royal Sardinian Army for war against Austria. Napoleon III looked for diplomatic support. He approached Lord Derby (the Prime Minister of the United Kingdom) and his government; Britain was against the war, but agreed to remain neutral. Still facing strong opposition within his own government, Napoleon III offered to negotiate a diplomatic solution with the twenty-eight-year-old Emperor Franz Joseph I of Austria in the spring of 1858. The Austrians demanded the disarmament of Piedmont-Sardinia first and sent thirty thousand soldiers to reinforce their garrisons in Italy. Napoleon III responded on 26 January 1859 by signing a treaty of alliance with Piedmont-Sardinia. Napoleon promised to send two hundred thousand soldiers to help one hundred thousand soldiers from Piedmont-Sardinia to force the Austrians out of Northern Italy; in return, France would receive the County of Nice and Savoy provided that their populations would agree in a referendum.

It was the Emperor Franz Joseph, growing impatient, who finally unleashed the war. On 23 April 1859, he sent an ultimatum to the government of Piedmont-Sardinia demanding that they stop their military preparations and disband their army. On 26 April, Count Cavour rejected the demands, and on 27 April, the Austrian army invaded Piedmont.

==== War in Italy – Magenta and Solferino (1859) ====
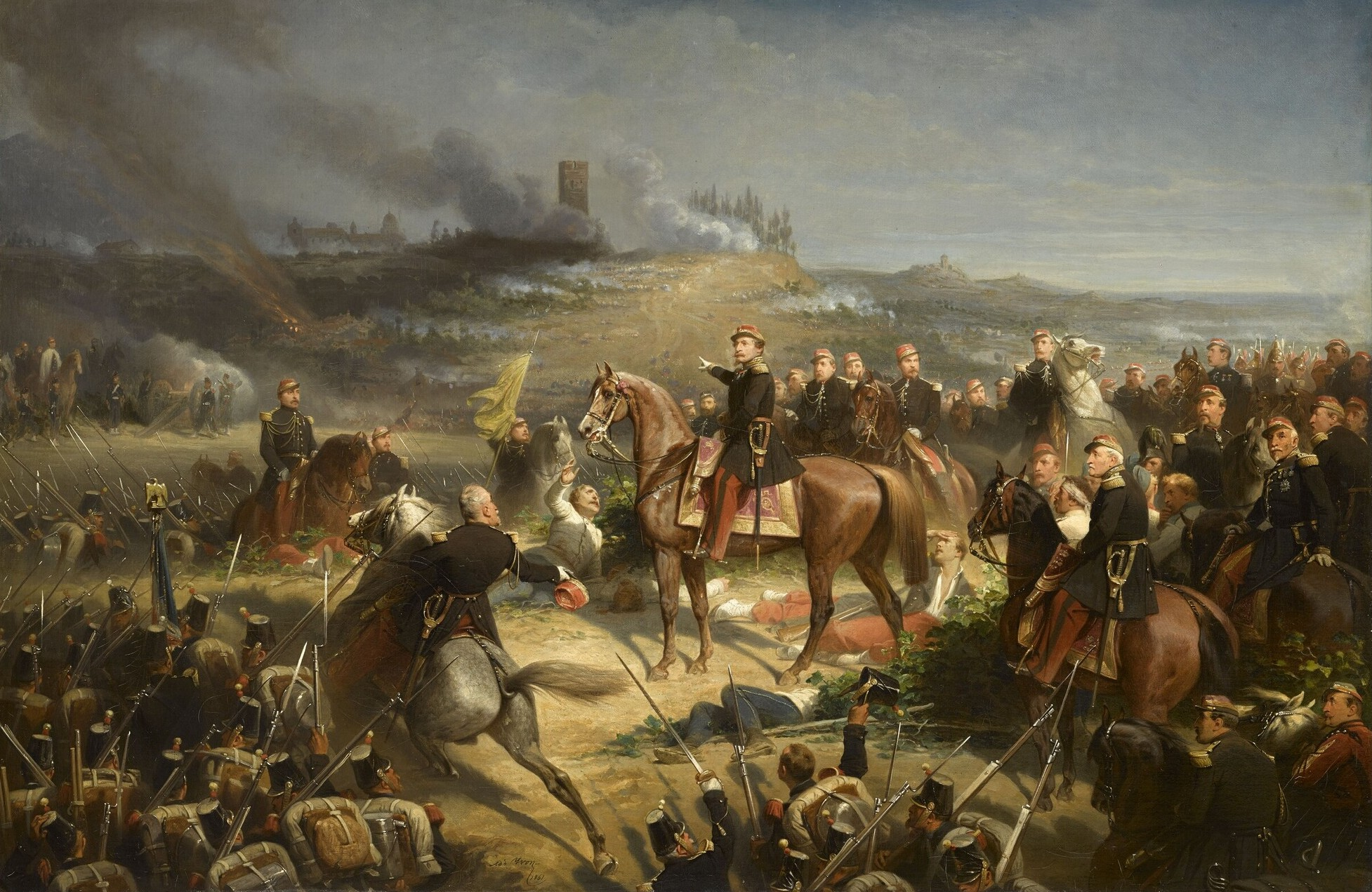
The Battle of Solferino by Adolphe Yvon. Napoleon III with the French forces at the Battle of Solferino, which secured the Austrian withdrawal from Italy. He was horrified by the casualties and ended the war soon after the battle.

Napoleon III, though he had very little military experience, decided to lead the French army in Italy himself. Part of the French army crossed over the Alps, while the other part, with the Emperor, landed in Genoa on 18 May 1859. Fortunately for Napoleon and the Piedmontese, the commander of the Austrians, General Ferenc Gyulay, was not very aggressive. His forces greatly outnumbered the Piedmontese army at Turin, but he hesitated, allowing the French and Piedmontese to unite their forces.

Napoleon III wisely left the fighting to his professional generals. The first great battle of the war, on 4 June 1859, was fought at the town of Magenta. It was long and bloody, and the French center was exhausted and nearly broken, but the battle was finally won by a timely attack on the Austrian flank by the soldiers of General Patrice de MacMahon. The Austrians had seven thousand men killed and five thousand captured, while the French forces had four thousand men killed. The battle was largely remembered because, soon after it was fought, patriotic chemists in France gave the name of the battle to their newly discovered bright purple chemical dye; the dye and the colour took the name magenta.

The rest of the Austrian army was able to escape while Napoleon III and King Victor Emmanuel made a triumphal entry on 10 June into the city of Milan, previously ruled by the Austrians. They were greeted by huge, jubilant crowds waving Italian and French flags.

The Austrians had been driven from Lombardy, but the army of General Gyulay remained in the Veneto. His army had been reinforced and numbered 130,000 men, roughly the same as the French and Piedmontese, though the Austrians were superior in artillery. On 24 June, the second and decisive battle was fought at Solferino. This battle was even longer and bloodier than Magenta. In confused and often ill-directed fighting, there were approximately forty thousand casualties, including 11,500 French.

Napoleon III was horrified by the thousands of dead and wounded on the battlefield. He proposed an armistice to the Austrians, which was accepted on 8 July. A formal treaty ending the war was signed on 11 July 1859.

Count Cavour and the Piedmontese were bitterly disappointed by the abrupt end of the war. Lombardy had been freed, but Venetia (the Venice region) was still controlled by the Austrians, and the Pope was still the ruler of Rome and Central Italy. Cavour angrily resigned his post. Napoleon III returned to Paris on 17 July, and a huge parade and celebration were held on 14 August, in front of the Vendôme column, the symbol of the glory of Napoleon I. Napoleon III celebrated the day by granting a general amnesty to the political prisoners and exiles he had chased from France.

In Italy, even without the French army, the process of Italian unification launched by Cavour and Napoleon III took on a momentum of its own. There were uprisings in central Italy and the Papal States, and Italian patriots, led by Garibaldi, invaded and took over Sicily, which would lead to the collapse of the Kingdom of the Two Sicilies. Napoleon III wrote to the Pope and suggested that he "make the sacrifice of your provinces in revolt and confide them to Victor Emmanuel". The Pope, furious, declared in a public address that Napoleon III was a "liar and a cheat". Rome and the surrounding Latium region remained in Papal hands, and therefore did not immediately become the capital of the newly created Kingdom of Italy, and Venetia was still occupied by the Austrians, but the rest of Italy had come under the rule of Victor Emmanuel.

As Cavour had promised, Savoy and the County of Nice were annexed by France in 1860 after referendums, although it is disputed how fair they were. In Nice, 25,734 voted for union with France, just 260 against, but Italians still called for its return into the 20th century. On 18 February 1861, the first Italian parliament met in Turin, and on 23 March, Victor Emmanuel was proclaimed King of Italy. Count Cavour died a few weeks later, declaring that "Italy is made."

Napoleon's support for the Italian patriots and his confrontation with Pope Pius IX over who would govern Rome made him unpopular with fervent French Catholics, and even with Empress Eugénie, who was a fervent Catholic. To win over the French Catholics and his wife, he agreed to guarantee that Rome would remain under the Pope and independent from the rest of Italy and agreed to keep French troops there. The capital of Italy became Turin (in 1861) then Florence (in 1865), not Rome. However, in 1862, Garibaldi gathered an army to march on Rome, under the slogan, "Rome or death". To avoid a confrontation between Garibaldi and the French soldiers, the Italian government sent its own soldiers to face them, arrested Garibaldi and put him in prison. Napoleon III sought a diplomatic solution that would allow him to withdraw French troops from Rome while guaranteeing that the city would remain under Papal control. In the 1864 September Convention the Italian government guaranteed the independence of the rump Papal States and the French garrison in Rome was withdrawn.

However, Garibaldi made another attempt to capture Rome in November 1867, but was defeated by a hastily dispatched French force and Papal troops at the Battle of Mentana on 3 November 1867.

The garrison of eight thousand French troops remained in Rome until August 1870, when they were recalled at the start of the Franco-Prussian War. In September 1870, the Royal Italian Army finally captured Rome and made it the capital of Italy.

After the successful conclusion of the Italian campaign and the annexation of Savoy and Nice to the territory of France, the Continental foreign policy of Napoleon III entered a calmer period. Expeditions to distant corners of the world and the expansion of the Empire replaced major changes in the map of Europe. The Emperor's health declined; he gained weight, he began to dye his hair to cover the gray, he walked slowly because of gout, and in 1864, at the military camp of Châlons-en-Champagne, he suffered the first medical crisis from his gallstones, the ailment that killed him nine years later. He was less engaged in governing and less attentive to detail, but still sought opportunities to increase French commerce and prestige globally.

=== Overseas empire ===
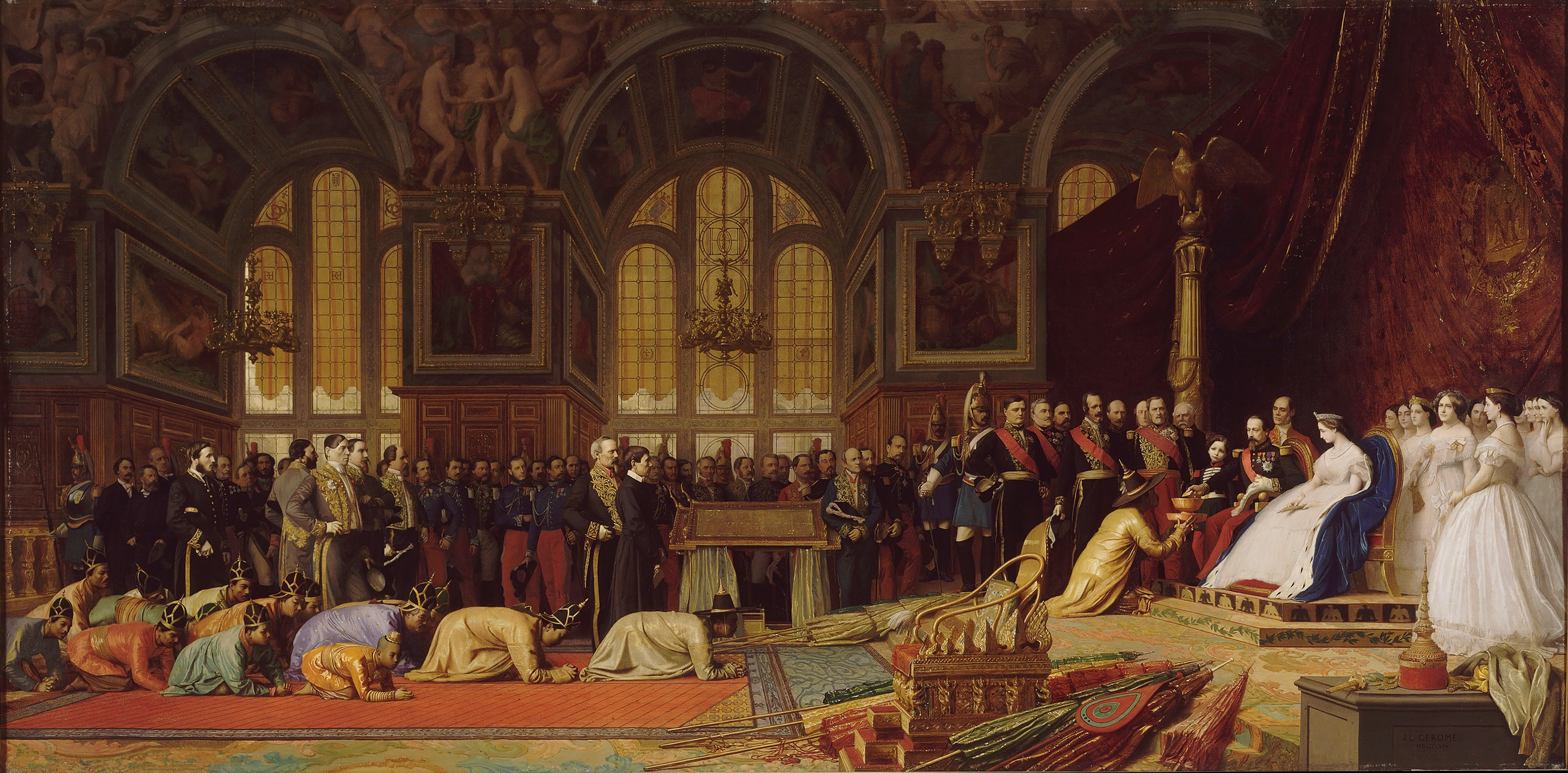
Reception of the Siamese ambassadors by Napoleon III at the palace of Fontainebleau, 27 June 1861 (painting by Jean-Léon Gérôme)

In 1862, Napoleon III sent troops to Mexico in an effort to establish an allied monarchy in the Americas, with Archduke Ferdinand Maximilian of Austria enthroned as Emperor Maximilian I. The Second Mexican Empire faced resistance from the republican government of President Benito Juárez, however. After victory in the American Civil War in 1865, the United States made clear that France would have to leave. It sent 50,000 troops under General Philip H. Sheridan to the Mexico–United States border and helped resupply Juárez. Napoleon III's military was stretched very thin; he had committed 40,000 troops to Mexico, 20,000 to Rome to guard the Pope against the Italians, as well as another 80,000 in restive Algeria. Furthermore, Prussia, having just defeated Austria in the Austro-Prussian War of 1866, was an imminent threat. Napoleon III realised his predicament and withdrew his troops from Mexico in 1866. Maximilian was overthrown and executed.

Napoleon III also supported a project of an Arab kingdom in Algeria, associated with France, based solely on the Arab cultural element to the detriment of others (Berber, etc.).

In Southeast Asia, Napoleon III was more successful in establishing control with one limited military operation at a time. In the Cochinchina Campaign, he took over Cochinchina (the southernmost part of modern Vietnam, including Saigon) in 1862. In 1863, he established a protectorate over Cambodia. Additionally, France had a sphere of influence during the 19th century and early 20th century in Southern China, including a naval base at Kuangchow Bay (Guangzhouwan). A French expedition to Korea was also mounted in response to the murder of French missionaries, although this ended in failure.

According to information given to Abdón Cifuentes in 1870 the possibility of an intervention in favour of the Kingdom of Araucanía and Patagonia against Chile was discussed in Napoleon's Conseil d'État. In 1870 the French battleship D'Entrecasteaux anchored at Corral drawing suspicions from Cornelio Saavedra of some sort of French interference in the ongoing occupation of Mapuche lands. A shipment arms was seized by Argentine authorities at Buenos Aires in 1871, reportedly this had been ordered by Orélie-Antoine de Tounens, the so-called King of Araucanía and Patagonia.

== Life at the court of Napoleon III ==
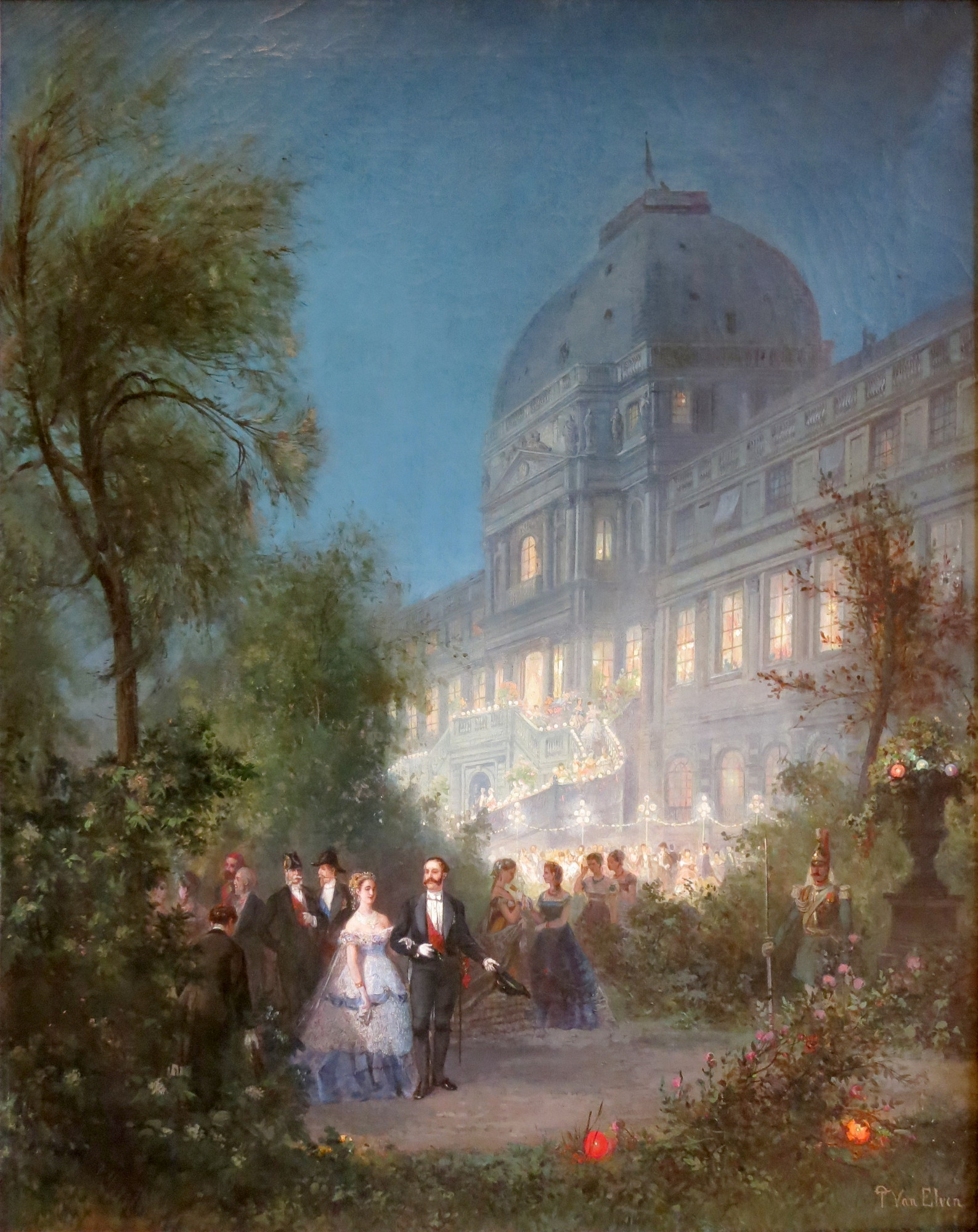
The Tuileries Palace during the gala soirée of 10 June 1867, hosted by Napoleon III for the sovereigns attending the Paris International Exhibition of 1867.

Following the model of the kings of France and of his uncle, Napoleon Bonaparte, Napoleon III moved his official residence to the Tuileries Palace, where he had a suite of rooms on the ground floor of the south wing between the Seine and the Pavillon de l'Horloge (Clock Pavilion), facing the garden.

Napoleon III's bedroom was decorated with a talisman from Charlemagne (a symbol of good luck for the Bonaparte family), while his office featured a portrait of Julius Caesar by Ingres and a large map of Paris that he used to show his ideas for the reconstruction of Paris to his prefect of the Seine department, Baron Georges-Eugène Haussmann. The Emperor's rooms were overheated and were filled with smoke, as he smoked cigarette after cigarette. The Empress occupied a suite of rooms just above his, highly decorated in Louis XVI style with a pink salon, a green salon and a blue salon.

The court moved with the Emperor and Empress from palace to palace each year following a regular calendar. At the beginning of May, the Emperor and court moved to the Château de Saint-Cloud for outdoor activities in the park. In June and July, they moved with selected guests to the Palace of Fontainebleau for walks in the forest and boating on the lake. In July, the court moved to thermal baths for a health cure, first to Plombières-les-Bains, then to Vichy, and then, after 1856, to the military camp and residence built at Châlons-sur-Marne (nowadays: Châlons-en-Champagne), where Napoleon could take the waters and review military parades and exercises. Beginning in 1856, the Emperor and Empress spent each September in Biarritz in the Villa Eugénie, a large villa overlooking the sea. They would walk on the beach or travel to the mountains, and in the evenings, they would dance and sing and play cards and take part in other games and amateur theatricals and charades with their guests. In November, the court moved to the Château de Compiègne for forest excursions, dancing and more games. Famous scientists and artists, such as Louis Pasteur, Gustave Flaubert, Eugène Delacroix and Giuseppe Verdi, were invited to participate in the festivities at Compiègne.

At the end of the year the Emperor and court returned to the Tuileries Palace and gave a series of formal receptions and three or four grand balls with six hundred guests early in the new year. Visiting dignitaries and monarchs were frequently invited. During Carnival, there was a series of very elaborate costume balls on the themes of different countries and different historical periods, for which guests sometimes spent small fortunes on their costumes.

=== Visual arts ===
Napoleon III had conservative and traditional taste in art: his favourite painters were Théodore Gudin, Alexandre Cabanel and Franz Xaver Winterhalter, who received major commissions, and whose work was purchased for state museums. At the same time, he followed public opinion, and he made an important contribution to the French avant-garde. In 1863, the jury of the Paris Salon, the famous annual showcase of French painting, headed by the ultra-conservative director of the Académie des Beaux-Arts, Count Émilien de Nieuwerkerke, refused all submissions by avant-garde artists, including those by Édouard Manet, Camille Pissarro and Johan Jongkind. The artists and their friends complained, and the complaints reached Napoleon III. His office issued a statement: "Numerous complaints have come to the Emperor on the subject of the works of art which were refused by the jury of the Exposition. His Majesty, wishing to let the public judge the legitimacy of these complaints, has decided that the works of art which were refused should be displayed in another part of the Palace of Industry."

Following Napoleon's decree, an exhibit of the rejected paintings, called the Salon des Refusés, was held in another part of the Palace of Industry, where the Salon took place. More than a thousand visitors a day came to see now-famous paintings such as Édouard Manet's Le Déjeuner sur l'herbe and James McNeill Whistler's Symphony in White, No. 1: The White Girl. ' The journalist Émile Zola reported that visitors pushed to get into the crowded galleries where the refused paintings were hung, and the rooms were full of the laughter and mocking comments of many of the spectators. While the paintings were ridiculed by many critics and visitors, the work of the avant-garde became known for the first time to the French public, and it took its place alongside the more traditional style of painting.

Napoleon III also began or completed the restoration of several important historic landmarks, carried out for him by Eugène Viollet-le-Duc. He restored the flèche, or spire, of the Cathedral of Notre-Dame de Paris, which had been partially destroyed and desecrated during the French Revolution. In 1855, he completed the restoration, begun in 1845, of the stained-glass windows of the Sainte-Chapelle, and in 1862, he declared it a national historical monument. In 1853, he approved and provided funding for Viollet-le-Duc's restoration of the medieval town of Carcassonne. He also sponsored Viollet-le-Duc's restoration of the Château de Vincennes and the Château de Pierrefonds. In 1862, he closed the prison which had occupied the Abbey of Mont-Saint-Michel since the French Revolution, where many important political prisoners had been held, so it could be restored and opened to the public.

== Social and economic policies ==
The defining characteristics of political Bonapartism were flexibility and adaptability. Napoleon III once commented on the diversity of opinions in his cabinet, united under the banner of Bonapartism. Referring to the leading figures in the government of the Second Empire, he remarked: "The Empress is a Legitimist, Morny is an Orléanist, Prince Napoleon is a Republican, and I myself am a Socialist. There is only one Bonapartist, Persigny – and he is mad!"

=== Social policy and reforms ===
From the beginning of his reign, Napoleon III launched a series of social reforms aimed at improving the life of the working class.

He began with small projects, such as opening up two clinics in Paris for sick and injured workers, a programme of legal assistance to those unable to afford it, as well as subsidies to companies that built low-cost housing for their workers. He outlawed the practice of employers taking possession of or making comments in the work document that every employee was required to carry; negative comments meant that workers were unable to get other jobs. In 1866, he encouraged the creation of a state insurance fund to help workers or peasants who became disabled and help their widows and families.

To help the working class, Napoleon III offered a prize to anyone who could develop an inexpensive substitute for butter; the prize was won by the French chemist Hippolyte Mège-Mouriès, who in 1869 patented a product he named oleomargarine, later shortened simply to margarine.

Napoleon III and his administration enacted significant censorship of the media, targeting political caricatures like those of Honoré Daumier.

==== Rights to strike and organise (1864–1866) ====
His most important social reform was the 1864 law that gave French workers the right to strike, which had been forbidden since 1810. In 1866, he added to this an "Edict of Tolerance" which gave factory workers the right to organise. He issued a decree regulating the treatment of apprentices and limited working hours on Sundays and holidays. He removed from the Napoleonic Code the infamous article 1781, which said that the declaration of the employer, even without proof, would be given more weight by the court than the word of the employee.

==== Education for girls and women, school reform (1861–1869) ====
Napoleon III and the Empress Eugénie worked to give girls and women greater access to public education. In 1861, through the direct intervention of the Emperor and the Empress, Julie-Victoire Daubié became the first woman in France to receive the baccalauréat diploma. In 1862, the first professional school for young women was opened, and Madeleine Brès became the first woman to enroll in the Faculty of Medicine at the University of Paris.

In 1863, he made Victor Duruy, the son of a factory worker and a respected historian, his new Minister of Public Education. Duruy accelerated the pace of the reforms, often coming into conflict with the Catholic Church, which wanted to keep control over education. Despite the opposition of the Church, Duruy opened schools for girls in each commune with more than five hundred residents, a total of eight hundred new schools.

Between 1863 and 1869, Duruy created scholastic libraries for fifteen thousand schools and required that primary schools offer courses in history and geography. Secondary schools began to teach philosophy, which had been banned by the previous regime at the request of the Catholic Church. For the first time, public schools in France began to teach contemporary history, modern languages, art, gymnastics and music. The results of the school reforms were dramatic: in 1852, over 40 percent of army conscripts in France were unable to read or write, yet by 1869, the number had dropped to 25 percent. The rate of illiteracy among both girls and boys dropped to 32 percent.

At the university level, Napoleon III founded new faculties in Marseille, Douai, Nancy, Clermont-Ferrand and Poitiers and founded a network of research institutes of higher studies in the sciences, history, and economics. These also were criticized by Catholic ecclesiastics. The Cardinal-Archbishop of Rouen, Monseigneur Bonnechose, wrote, "True science is religious, while false science, on the other hand, is vain and prideful; being unable to explain God, it rebels against him."

=== Economic policy ===
==== Lower tariffs and the re-opening of French markets (1860) ====
One of the centerpieces of the economic policy of Napoleon III was the lowering of tariffs and the opening of French markets to imported goods. He had been in Britain in 1846 when Prime Minister Robert Peel had lowered tariffs on imported grains, and he had seen the benefits to British consumers and the British economy. However, he faced bitter opposition from many French industrialists and farmers, who feared British competition. Convinced he was right, he sent his chief economic advisor, Michel Chevalier, to London to begin discussions, and secretly negotiated a new commercial agreement with Britain, calling for the gradual lowering of tariffs in both countries. He signed the treaty, without consulting with the Assembly, on 23 January 1860. Four hundred of the top industrialists in France came to Paris to protest, but he refused to yield. Industrial tariffs on such products as steel rails for railways were lowered first; tariffs on grains were not lowered until June 1861. Similar agreements were negotiated with the Netherlands, Italy, and France's other neighbors. France's industries were forced to modernize and become more efficient to compete with the British, as Napoleon III had intended. Commerce between the countries surged.

==== Economic expansion and social change ====
By the 1860s, the huge state investment in railways, infrastructure and fiscal policies of Napoleon III had brought dramatic changes to the French economy and French society. French people travelled in greater numbers, more often and farther than they had ever travelled before. The opening of the first public school libraries by Napoleon III and the opening by Louis Hachette of the first bookstores in Napoleon's new train stations led to the wider circulation of books around France.

During the Empire, industrial production increased by 73 percent, growing twice as rapidly as that of the United Kingdom, though its total output remained lower. From 1850 to 1857, the French economy grew at a pace of five percent a year and exports grew by sixty percent between 1855 and 1869.

French agricultural production increased by sixty percent, spurred by new farming techniques taught at the agricultural schools started in each Department by Napoleon III, and new markets opened by the railways. The threat of famine, which for centuries had haunted the French countryside, receded. The last recorded famine in France was in 1855.

During the Empire, the migration of the rural population to the cities increased. The portion of the population active in agriculture dropped from 61 percent in 1851 to 54 percent in 1870.

The average salary of French workers grew by 45 percent during the Second Empire, but only kept up with price inflation. On the other hand, more French people than ever were able to save money; the number of bank accounts grew from 742,889 in 1852 to 2,079,141 in 1870.

Between 1850 and 1869, GDP grew by 34 percent, expanding from 58,039 million to 78,029 million 1990 Int$. The French economy was the second largest in Western Europe, behind only the United Kingdom, which expanded from 62,893 million to 94,339 million over the same period.

==== Growing opposition and liberal concessions (1860–1870) ====
Despite the economic progress the country had made, domestic opposition to Napoleon III was slowly growing, particularly in the Corps législatif (Parliament). The liberal republicans on the left had always opposed him, believing he had usurped power and suppressed the Republic. The conservative Catholics were increasingly unhappy, because he had abandoned the Pope in his struggle to retain political control of the Papal States and had built up a public education system that was a rival to the Catholic system. Many businessmen, particularly in the metallurgical and textile industries, were unhappy, because he had reduced the tariffs on British products, putting the British products in direct competition with their own. The members of Parliament were particularly unhappy with him for dealing with them only when he needed money. When he had liberalized trade with England, he had not even consulted them.

Napoleon's large-scale program of public works, and his expensive foreign policy, had created rapidly mounting government debts; the annual deficit was about 100 million gold-francs, and the cumulative debt had reached nearly 1,000 million gold-francs (1 billion in US readings). The Emperor needed to restore the confidence of the business world and to involve the legislature and have them share responsibility.

On 24 December 1860, Napoleon III, against the opposition of his own ministers, issued a decree announcing that the legislature would have greater powers. The Senate and the Assembly could, for the first time, give a response to the Emperor's program, ministers were obliged to defend their programs before the Assembly, and the right of Deputies to amend the programs was enlarged. On 1 February 1861, further reforms were announced: Deputies could speak from the tribune, not just from their seats, and a stenographic record would be made and published of each session. Another even more important reform was announced on 31 December 1861: the budget of each ministry would be voted section by section, not in a block, and the government could no longer spend money by special decree when the legislature was not in session. He did retain the right to change the budget estimates section by section.

The Deputies quickly took advantage of their new rights; the Emperor's Italian policy was bitterly condemned in Parliament, and anti-government amendments by the pro-Catholic deputies were defeated by votes of 158 to 91 in the Corps législatif and 79 to 61 in the Senate.

In the legislative elections of 1863, pro-government candidates received 5,308,000 votes, while the opposition received 1,954,000 votes, three times more than in the previous elections. The rural departments still voted for Napoleon III's candidates, but in Paris, 63 percent of the votes went to anti-government republican candidates, with similar numbers in all the large cities. The new Assembly contained a large opposition block ranging from Catholics outraged by the Papal policies to Legitimists, Orléanists, protectionists and republicans, armed with new powers given to them by the Emperor himself.

Despite the opposition in the legislature, Napoleon III's reforms remained popular in the rest of the country. A new plebiscite was held in 1870, on this text: "The people approve the liberal reforms added to the Constitution since 1860 by the Emperor, with the agreement of the legislative bodies and ratified by the Senate on April 20, 1870." Napoleon III saw this as a referendum on his rule as Emperor: "By voting yes," he wrote, "you will chase away the threat of revolution; you will place the nation on a solid base of order and liberty, and you will make it easier to pass on the Crown to my son." When the votes were counted, Napoleon III had lost Paris and the other big cities but decisively won the rest of the country. The final vote was 7,336,434 votes yes, 1,560,709 votes no, and 1,900,000 abstentions. Léon Gambetta, the leader of the republican opposition, wrote in despair, "We were crushed. The Emperor is more popular than ever."

== Later years ==
=== Declining health and rise of Prussia ===
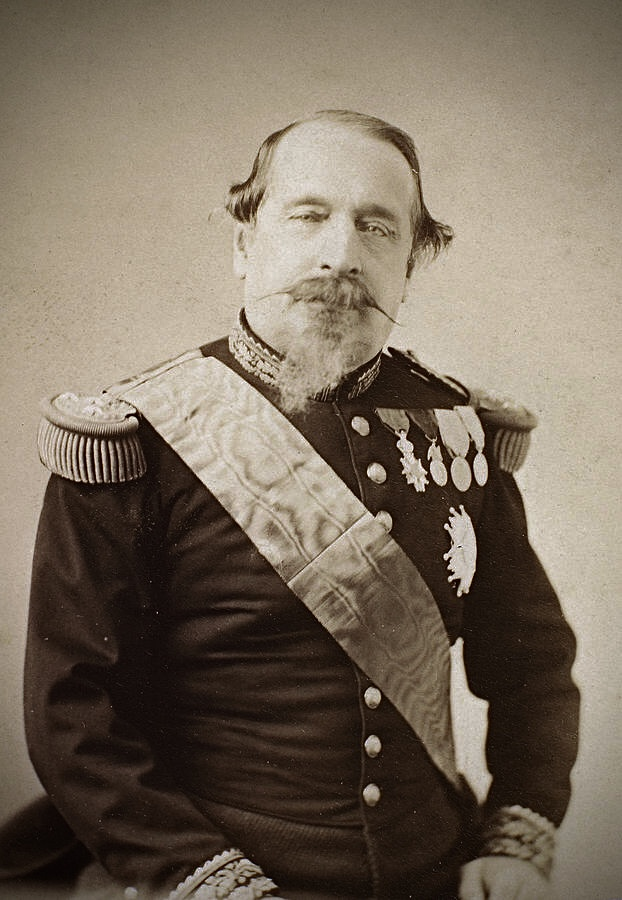
Napoleon III c. 1870–1873, visibly weakened by his rapidly declining health.

Through the 1860s, the health of the Emperor steadily worsened. It had been damaged by his six years in prison at Ham; he had chronic pains in his legs and feet, particularly when it was cold, and as a result, he always lived and worked in overheated rooms and offices. He smoked heavily, distrusted doctors and their advice and attributed any problems simply to "rheumatism", for which he regularly visited the hot springs at Vichy and other spas. It became difficult for him to ride a horse, and he was obliged to walk slowly, often with a cane. From 1869 onwards, the crises of his urinary tract were treated with opium, which made him seem lethargic and apathetic. His writing became hard to read and his voice weak. In the spring of 1870, he was visited by an old friend from England, Lord Malmesbury. Malmesbury found him to be "terribly changed and very ill".

The health problems of the Emperor were kept secret by the government, which feared that, if his condition became public, the opposition would demand his abdication. One newspaper, the Courrier de la Vienne, was warned by the censors to stop publishing articles which had "a clear and malicious intent to spread, contrary to the truth, alarms about the health of the Emperor".

At the end of June 1870, a specialist in the problems of urinary tracts, Germain Sée, was finally summoned to examine him. Sée reported that the Emperor was suffering from a bladder stone. On 2 July, four eminent French doctors, Auguste Nélaton, Philippe Ricord, Fauvel and Corvisart, examined him and confirmed the diagnosis. They were reluctant to operate, however, because of the high risk and because of the Emperor's weakness. Before anything further could be done, however, France was in the middle of a diplomatic crisis.

In the 1860s, Prussia appeared on the horizon as a new rival to French power in Europe. Its Minister President, Otto von Bismarck, had ambitions for Prussia to lead a unified Germany. In May 1862, Bismarck came to Paris on a diplomatic mission and met Napoleon III for the first time. They had cordial relations. On 30 September 1862, however, in Munich, Bismarck declared, in a famous speech: "It is not by speeches and votes of the majority that the great questions of our period will be settled, as one believed in 1848, but by iron and blood." Bismarck saw Austria and France as the main obstacles to his ambitions, and he set out to divide and defeat them.

=== Search for allies, and war between Austria and Prussia ===
In the winter and spring of 1864, when the German Confederation invaded and occupied the German-speaking duchies ruled by Denmark (Schleswig and Holstein), Napoleon III recognized the threat that a unified Germany would pose to France, and he looked for allies to challenge Germany, without success.

The British government was suspicious that Napoleon wanted to take over Belgium and Luxembourg, felt secure with its powerful navy, and did not want any military engagements on the European continent at the side of the French.

The Russian government was also suspicious of Napoleon, who it believed had encouraged Polish nationalists to rebel against Russian rule in 1863. Bismarck and Prussia, on the other hand, had offered assistance to Russia to help crush the Polish patriots.

In October 1865, Napoleon had a cordial meeting with Bismarck at Biarritz. They discussed Venetia, Austria's remaining province in Italy. Bismarck told Napoleon that Prussia had no secret arrangement to give Venetia to Italy, and Napoleon assured him in turn that France had no secret understanding with Austria. Bismarck hinted vaguely that, in the event of a war between Austria and Prussia, French neutrality would be rewarded with some sort of territory as a compensation. Napoleon III had Luxembourg in mind.

In 1866, relations between Austria and Prussia worsened and Bismarck demanded the expulsion of Austria from the German Confederation. Napoleon and his foreign minister, Drouyn de Lhuys, expected a long war and an eventual Austrian victory. Napoleon III felt he could extract a price from both Prussia and Austria for French neutrality. On 12 June 1866, France signed a secret treaty with Austria, guaranteeing French neutrality in a Prussian-Austrian war. In exchange, in the event of an Austrian victory, Austria would give Venetia to France and would also create a new independent German state on the Rhine, which would become an ally of France. At the same time, Napoleon proposed a secret treaty with Bismarck, promising that France would remain neutral in a war between Austria and Prussia. In the event of a Prussian victory, France would recognize Prussia's annexation of smaller German states, and France, in exchange, would receive a portion of German territory, the Palatinate region north of Alsace. Bismarck, rightly confident of success due to the modernization of the Prussian Army, summarily rejected Napoleon's offer.

On 15 June, the Prussian Army invaded Saxony, an ally of Austria. On 2 July, Austria asked Napoleon to arrange an armistice between Italy, which had allied itself with Prussia, and Austria, in exchange for which France would receive Venetia. But on 3 July, the Prussian army crushed the Austrian army at the Battle of Königgrätz in Bohemia. The way to Vienna was open for the Prussians, and Austria asked for an armistice. The armistice was signed on 22 July; Prussia annexed the Kingdom of Hanover, the Electorate of Hesse, the Duchy of Nassau and the Free City of Frankfurt, with a combined population of four million people.

The Austrian defeat was followed by a new crisis in the health of Napoleon III. Marshal Canrobert, who saw him on 28 July, wrote that the Emperor "was pitiful to see. He could barely sit up in his armchair, and his drawn face expressed at the same time moral anguish and physical pain.

=== Luxembourg Crisis ===
Napoleon III still hoped to receive some compensation from Prussia for French neutrality during the war. His foreign minister, Drouyn, asked Bismarck for the Palatinate region on the Rhine, which belonged to Bavaria, and for the demilitarization of Luxembourg, which was the site of a formidable fortress staffed by a strong Prussian garrison in accordance with international treaties. Napoleon's senior advisor Eugène Rouher increased the demands, asking that Prussia accept the annexation by France of Belgium and of Luxembourg, sparking the Luxembourg Crisis.

Luxembourg had regained its de jure independence in 1839 as a grand duchy. However, it was in personal union with the Netherlands. King William III of the Netherlands, who was also Grand Duke of Luxembourg, desperately needed money and was prepared to sell the Grand Duchy to France. Bismarck swiftly intervened and showed the British ambassador a copy of Napoleon's demands; as a result, he put pressure on William III to refuse to sell Luxembourg to France. France was forced to renounce any claim to Luxembourg in the Treaty of London (1867). Napoleon III gained nothing for his efforts but the demilitarization of the Luxembourg fortress.

=== Failure to increase the size of the French Army ===
Despite his failing health, Napoleon III could see that the Prussian Army, combined with the armies of Bavaria and the other German states, would be a formidable enemy. In 1866, Prussia, with a population of 22 million, had been able to mobilize an army of 700,000 men, while France, with a population of 38 million, had an army of only 385,000 men, of whom 140,000 were in Algeria, Mexico, and Rome. In the autumn of 1867, Napoleon III proposed a form of universal military service similar to the Prussian system to increase the size of the French Army, if needed, to 1 million. His proposal was opposed by many French officers, such as Marshal Randon, who preferred a smaller, more professional army; he said: "This proposal will only give us recruits; it's soldiers we need." It was also strongly opposed by the republican opposition in the French parliament, who denounced the proposal as a militarization of French society. The republican deputy Émile Ollivier, who later became Napoleon's prime minister, declared: "The armies of France, which I always considered too large, are now going to be increased to an exorbitant size. Why? What is the necessity? Where is the danger? Who is threatening us? ...If France were to disarm, the Germans would know how to convince their governments to do the same." Facing almost certain defeat in the parliament, Napoleon III withdrew the proposal. It was replaced in January 1868 by a much more modest project to create a garde mobile, or reserve force, to support the army.

=== A last search for allies ===
Napoleon III was overconfident in his military strength and went into war even after he failed to find any allies who would support a war to stop German unification.

Following the defeat of Austria, Napoleon resumed his search for allies against Prussia. In April 1867, he proposed an alliance, defensive and offensive, with Austria. If Austria joined France in a victorious war against Prussia, Napoleon promised that Austria could form a new confederation with the southern states of Germany and could annex Silesia, while France took for its part the left bank of the Rhine River. But the timing of Napoleon's offer was poorly chosen; Austria was in the process of a major internal reform, creating the new Dual Monarchy of Austria-Hungary.

Napoleon's attempt to install the Archduke Maximilian, the brother of the Austrian Emperor, in Mexico was just coming to its disastrous conclusion; the French troops had just been withdrawn from Mexico in February 1867, and the unfortunate Maximilian would be captured, judged and shot by a firing squad on 19 June. Napoleon III made these offers again in August 1867, on a visit to offer condolences for the death of Maximilian, but the proposal was not received with enthusiasm.

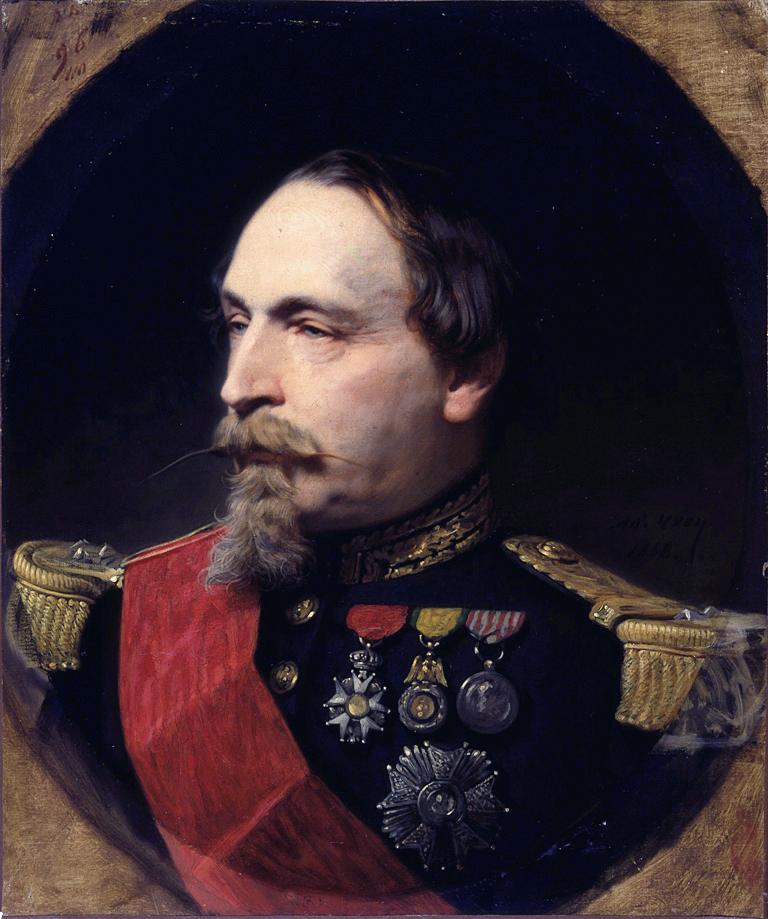
Portrait of Napoleon III in 1868 by Adolphe Yvon

Napoleon III also made one last attempt to persuade Italy to be his ally against Prussia. Italian King Victor Emmanuel was personally favorable to a better relationship with France, remembering the role that Napoleon III had played in achieving Italian unification, but Italian public opinion was largely hostile to France; on 3 November 1867, French and Papal soldiers had fired upon the Italian patriots of Garibaldi, when he tried to capture Rome. Napoleon presented a proposed treaty of alliance on 4 June 1869, the anniversary of the joint French-Italian victory at Magenta. The Italians responded by demanding that France withdraw its troops who were protecting the Pope in Rome. Given the opinion of fervent French Catholics, this was a condition Napoleon III could not accept.

While Napoleon III was having no success finding allies, Bismarck signed secret military treaties with the southern German states, who promised to provide troops in the event of a war between Prussia and France. In 1868, Bismarck signed an accord with Russia that gave Russia liberty of action in the Balkans in exchange for neutrality in the event of a war between France and Prussia. This treaty put additional pressure on Austria-Hungary, which also had interests in the Balkans, not to ally itself with France.

But most importantly, Prussia promised to support Russia in lifting the restrictions of the Congress of Paris. "Bismarck had bought Tsar Alexander II's complicity by promising to help restore his naval access to the Black Sea and Mediterranean (cut off by the treaties ending the Crimean War), other powers were less biddable". Bismarck also reached out to the liberal government of William Gladstone in London, offering to protect the neutrality of Belgium against a French threat. The British Foreign Office under Lord Clarendon mobilized the British fleet, to dissuade France against any aggressive moves against Belgium. In any war between France and Prussia, France would be entirely alone.

In 1867, French politician Adolphe Thiers (who became President of the French Republic in 1871) accused Napoleon III of erroneous foreign policy: "There is no mistake that can be made". Bismarck thought that French vanity would lead to war; he exploited that vanity in the Ems Dispatch in July 1870. France took the bait and declared war on Prussia, which proved to be a major miscalculation. This allowed Bismarck and Prussia to present the war to the world as defensive, although Prussia and Bismarck had aggressive plans, and they soon became known in relation to the annexation of the French provinces of Alsace-Lorraine.

=== Hohenzollern candidacy and the Ems telegram ===
In his memoirs, written long after the war, Bismarck wrote, "I always considered that a war with France would naturally follow a war against Austria... I was convinced that the gulf which was created over time between the north and the south of Germany could not be better overcome than by a national war against the neighbouring people who were aggressive against us. I did not doubt that it was necessary to make a French-German war before the general reorganization of Germany could be realized." As the summer of 1870 approached, pressure mounted on Bismarck to have a war with France as quickly as possible. In Bavaria, the largest of the southern German states, unification with (mostly Protestant) Prussia was being opposed by the Patriotic Party, which favoured a confederacy of (Catholic) Bavaria with (Catholic) Austria. German Protestant public opinion was on the side of unification with Prussia.

In France, patriotic sentiment was also growing. On 8 May 1870, French voters had overwhelmingly supported Napoleon III's program in a national plebiscite, with 7,358,000 votes yes against 1,582,000 votes no, an increase of support of two million votes since the legislative elections in 1869. The Emperor was less popular in Paris and the big cities, but highly popular in the French countryside. Napoleon had named a new foreign minister, Antoine Agenor, the Duke de Gramont, who was hostile to Bismarck. The Emperor was weak and ill, but the more extreme Bonapartists were prepared to show their strength against the republicans and monarchists in the parliament.

The news of Leopold, Prince of Hohenzollern's candidacy for the Spanish crown, published 2 July 1870, aroused fury in the French parliament and press. The government was attacked by both the republicans and monarchist opposition, and by the ultra-Bonapartists, for its weakness against Prussia. On 6 July, Napoleon III held a meeting of his ministers at the château of Saint-Cloud and told them that Prussia must withdraw the Hohenzollern candidacy or there would be a war. He asked Marshal Leboeuf, the chief of staff of the French army, if the army was prepared for a war against Prussia. Leboeuf responded that the French soldiers had a rifle superior to the Prussian rifle, that the French artillery was commanded by an elite corps of officers, and that the army "would not lack a button on its puttees". He assured the Emperor that the French army could have four hundred thousand men on the Rhine in less than fifteen days.

The French Ambassador to Prussia, Count Vincent Benedetti, was sent to the German spa resort of Bad Ems, where the Prussian king was staying. Benedetti met with the king on 13 July in the park of the château. The king told him courteously that he agreed fully with the withdrawal of the Hohenzollern candidacy, but that he could not make promises on behalf of the government for the future. He considered that the matter was closed. As he was instructed by Gramont, Benedetti asked for another meeting with the king to repeat the request, but the king politely, yet firmly, refused. Benedetti returned to Paris and the affair seemed finished. However, Bismarck edited the official dispatch of the meeting to make it appear that both sides had been hostile: "His majesty the King," the dispatch read, "refused to meet again with the French ambassador, and let him know, through an aide-de-camp of service, that His Majesty had nothing more to say to the Ambassador." This version was communicated to governments, and the next day was in the French press.

The Ems telegram had exactly the effect that Bismarck had intended. Once again, public opinion in France was inflamed. "This text produced the effect of a red flag to the Gallic bull," Bismarck later wrote. Gramont, the French foreign minister, declared that he felt "he had just received a slap." The leader of the conservatives in parliament, Thiers, spoke for moderation, arguing that France had won the diplomatic battle and there was no reason for war, but he was drowned out by cries that he was a traitor and a Prussian. Napoleon's new prime minister, Émile Ollivier, declared that France had done all that it could humanly and honourably do to prevent the war, and that he accepted the responsibility "with a light heart". A crowd of 15,000–20,000 persons, carrying flags and patriotic banners, marched through the streets of Paris, demanding war. On 19 July 1870, a declaration of war was sent to the Prussian government.

=== Defeat in the Franco-Prussian War ===
When France entered the war, there were patriotic demonstrations in the streets of Paris, with crowds singing La Marseillaise and chanting "To Berlin! To Berlin!" But Napoleon III was melancholic. He told General Lepic that he expected the war to be "long and difficult", and wondered, "Who knows if we'll come back?" He told Marshal Randon that he felt too old for a military campaign. Despite his declining health, Napoleon decided to go with the army to the front as commander in chief, as he had done during the successful Italian campaign. On 28 July, he departed Saint-Cloud by train for the front. He was accompanied by the 14-year-old Prince Imperial in the uniform of the army, by his military staff, and by a large contingent of chefs and servants in livery. He was pale and visibly in pain. The Empress remained in Paris as the Regent, as she had done on other occasions when the Emperor was out of the country.

The mobilization of the French army was chaotic. Two hundred thousand soldiers converged on the German frontier, along a front of 250 kilometers, choking all the roads and railways for miles. Officers and their respective units were unable to find one another. General Moltke and the Prussian Army, having gained experience mobilizing in the war against Austria, were able to efficiently move three armies of 518,000 men to a more concentrated front of just 120 kilometers. In addition, the German soldiers were backed by a substantial reserve of the Landwehr (Territorial defence), with 340,000 men, and an additional reserve of 400,000 territorial guards. The French army arrived at the frontier equipped with maps of Germany, but without maps of France—where the actual fighting took place—and without a specific plan of what it was going to do.

On 2 August, Napoleon and the Prince Imperial accompanied the army as it made a tentative crossing of the German border toward the city of Saarbrücken. The French won a minor skirmish and advanced no further. Napoleon III, very ill, was unable to ride his horse and had to support himself by leaning against a tree. In the meantime, the Prussians had assembled a much larger army opposite Alsace and Lorraine than the French had expected or were aware of. On 4 August 1870, the Prussians attacked with overwhelming force against a French division in Alsace at the Battle of Wissembourg (German: Weissenburg), forcing it to retreat. On 5 August, the Germans defeated another French army at the Battle of Spicheren in Lorraine.

On 6 August, 140,000 Germans attacked 35,000 French soldiers at the Battle of Wörth; the French lost 19,200 soldiers killed, wounded and captured, and were forced to retreat. The French soldiers fought bravely, and French cavalry and infantry attacked the German lines repeatedly, but the Germans had superior logistics, communications, and leadership. The decisive weapon was the new German Krupp six pound field gun, which was breech-loading, had a steel barrel, longer range, a higher rate of fire, and was more accurate than the bronze muzzle-loading French cannons. The Krupp guns caused terrible casualties in the French ranks.

When news of the French defeats reached Paris on 7 August, it was greeted with disbelief and dismay. Prime Minister Ollivier and the army chief of staff, Marshal Edmond Le Boeuf, both resigned. The Empress Eugénie took it upon herself as the Regent to name a new government. She chose General Cousin-Montauban, better known as the Count of Palikao, seventy-four years old and former commander of the French expeditionary force to China, as her new prime minister. The Count of Palikao named Marshal François Achille Bazaine, the commander of the French forces in Lorraine, as the new military commander.

Napoleon III proposed returning to Paris, realizing that he was not doing any good for the army. The Empress, in charge of the government, responded by telegraph, "Don't think of coming back, unless you want to unleash a terrible revolution. They will say you quit the army to flee the danger." The Emperor agreed to remain with the army. With the Empress directing the country, and Bazaine commanding the army, the Emperor no longer had any real role to play. At the front, the Emperor told Marshal Leboeuf, "we've both been dismissed."

On 18 August 1870, the Battle of Gravelotte, the biggest battle of the war, took place in Lorraine between the Germans and the army of Marshal Bazaine. The Germans suffered 20,000 casualties and the French 12,000, but the Germans emerged as the victors, as Marshal Bazaine's army, with 175,000 soldiers, six divisions of cavalry and five hundred cannons, was besieged inside the fortifications of Metz, unable to move.

Napoleon was at Châlons-sur-Marne with the army of Marshal Patrice de MacMahon. MacMahon, Marshal Bazaine, and the count of Palikao, with the Empress in Paris, all had different ideas of what the army should do next, and the Emperor had to act as a referee. The Emperor and MacMahon proposed moving their army closer to Paris to protect the city, but on 17 August Bazaine telegraphed to the Emperor: "I urge you to renounce this idea, which seems to abandon the Army at Metz... Couldn't you make a powerful diversion toward the Prussian corps, which are already exhausted by so many battles? The Empress shares my opinion." Napoleon III wrote back, "I yield to your opinion." The Emperor sent the Prince Imperial back to Paris for his safety and went with the weary army in the direction of Metz. The Emperor, riding in an open carriage, was jeered, sworn at and insulted by demoralized soldiers.

The direction of movement of MacMahon's army was supposed to be secret, but it was published in the French press and thus was quickly known to the German General Staff. Moltke, the German commander, ordered two Prussian armies marching toward Paris to turn towards MacMahon's army. On 30 August, one corps of MacMahon's army was attacked by the Germans at Beaumont, losing five hundred men and forty cannons. MacMahon, believing he was ahead of the Germans, decided to stop and reorganize his forces at the fortified city of Sedan, in the Ardennes close to the Belgian border.

==== Battle of Sedan and capitulation ====
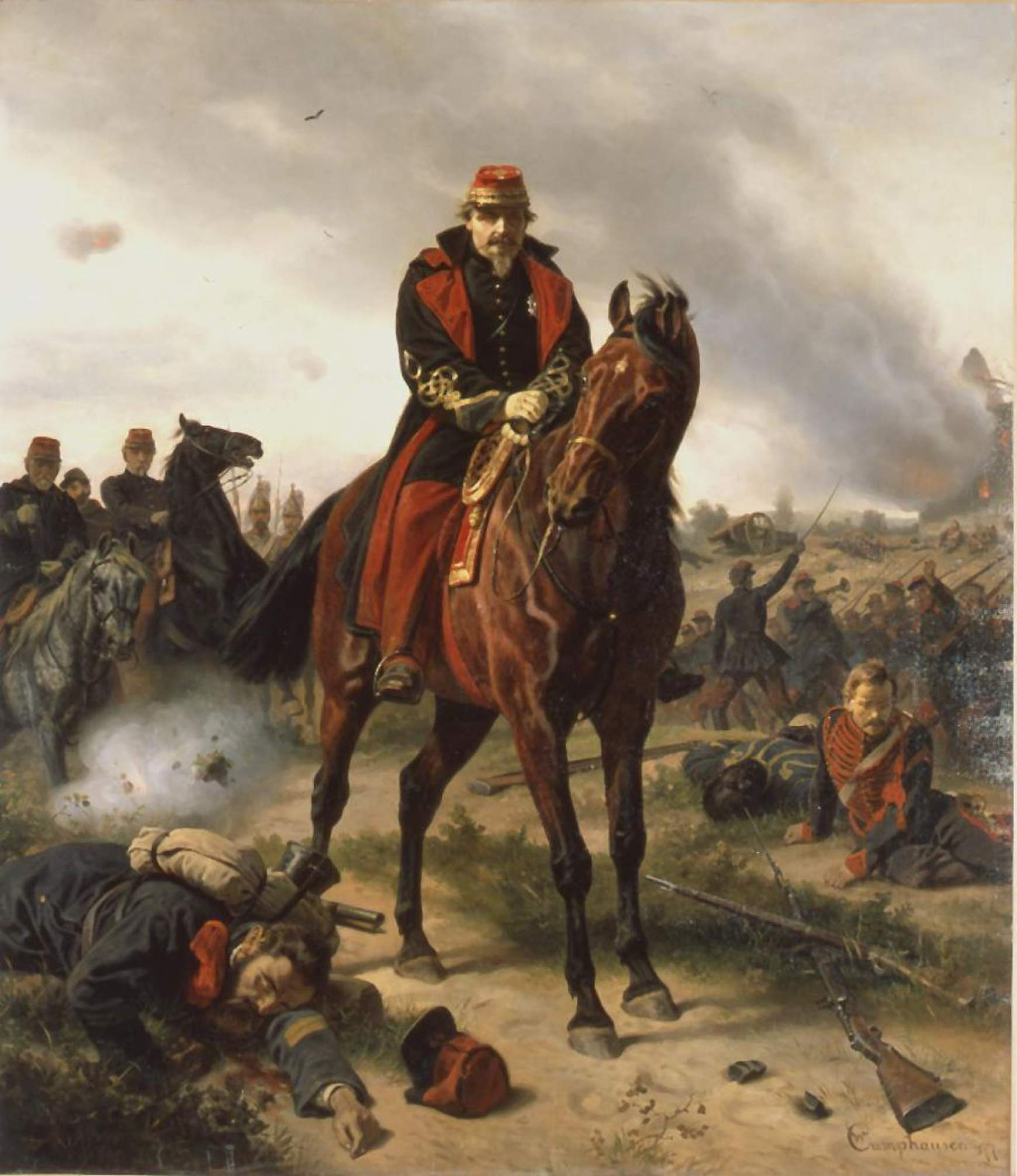
Napoleon III at the Battle of Sedan (by Wilhelm Camphausen)

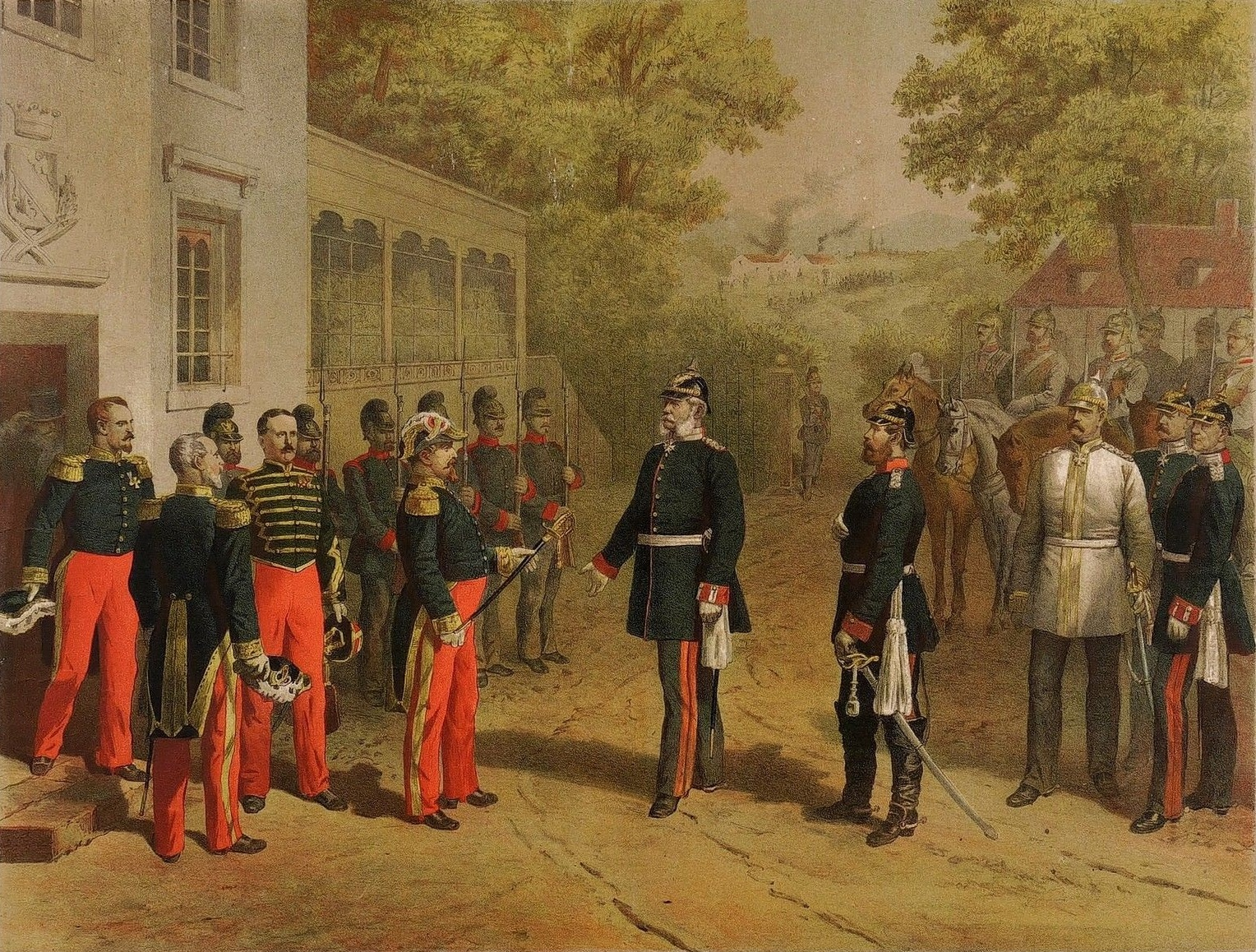
Surrender of Napoleon III after the Battle of Sedan, 1 September 1870

The Battle of Sedan was a total disaster for the French—the army surrendered to the Prussians and Napoleon III himself was made a prisoner of war. MacMahon arrived at Sedan with one hundred thousand soldiers, not knowing that two German armies were closing in on the city (one from the west and one from the east), blocking any escape. The Germans arrived on 31 August, and by 1 September, occupied the heights around Sedan where they placed artillery batteries, and began shelling the French positions below. At five o'clock in the morning on 1 September, a German shell seriously wounded MacMahon in the hip. Sedan quickly came under bombardment from seven hundred German guns. MacMahon's replacement, General Wimpffen, launched a series of cavalry attacks to try to break the German encirclement, with no success. During the battle and bombardment, the French lost 17,000 killed or wounded and 21,000 captured.

As the German shells rained down on the French positions, Napoleon III wandered aimlessly in the open around the French positions. One officer of his military escort was killed and two more received wounds. A doctor accompanying him wrote in his notebook, "If this man has not come here to kill himself, I don't know what he has come to do. I have not seen him give an order all morning."

Finally, at one o'clock in the afternoon, Napoleon III emerged from his reverie and ordered a white flag hoisted above the citadel. He then had a message sent to the Prussian king, who was at Sedan with his army: "Monsieur my brother, not being able to die at the head of my troops, nothing remains for me but to place my sword in the hands of Your Majesty."

After the war, when accused of having made a "shameful surrender" at Sedan, he wrote:

Some people believe that, by burying ourselves under the ruins of Sedan, we would have better served my name and my dynasty. It's possible. Nay, to hold in my hand the lives of thousands of men and not to make a sign to save them was something that was beyond my capacity....my heart refused these sinister grandeurs.

At six o'clock in the morning on 2 September, in the uniform of a general and accompanied by four generals from his staff, Napoleon was taken to the German headquarters at Donchery. He expected to see King Wilhelm I, but instead he was met by Otto von Bismarck and the German commander, General Helmuth von Moltke. They dictated the terms of the surrender to Napoleon. Napoleon asked that his army be disarmed and allowed to pass into Belgium, but Bismarck refused. They also asked Napoleon to sign the preliminary documents of a peace treaty, but Napoleon refused, telling them that the French government headed by the Regent, Empress Eugénie, would need to negotiate any peace agreement. The Emperor was then taken to the Château at Bellevue near Frénois (Ardennes), where the Prussian king visited him. Napoleon told the king that he had not wanted the war, but that public opinion had forced him into it. That evening, from the Château, Napoleon wrote to the Empress Eugénie:

It is impossible for me to say what I have suffered and what I am suffering now...I would have preferred death to a capitulation so disastrous, and yet, under the present circumstances, it was the only way to avoid the butchering of sixty thousand people. If only all my torments were concentrated here! I think of you, our son, and our unhappy country.

==== Aftermath ====
The news of the capitulation reached Paris on 3 September, confirming the rumours that were already circulating in the city. When the Empress heard the news that the Emperor and the army had been taken prisoner, she reacted by shouting at the Emperor's personal aide, "No! An Emperor does not capitulate! He is dead!...They are trying to hide it from me. Why didn't he kill himself! Doesn't he know he has dishonoured himself?!" Later, when hostile crowds formed near the palace and the staff began to flee, the Empress slipped out with one of her entourage and sought sanctuary with her American dentist, Thomas Evans, who took her to Deauville. From there, on 7 September, she took the yacht of a British official to England.

On 4 September, a group of republican deputies, led by Léon Gambetta, gathered at the Hôtel de Ville in Paris and proclaimed the return of the Republic and the creation of a Government of National Defence. The Second Empire had come to an end.

=== Captivity, exile and death ===
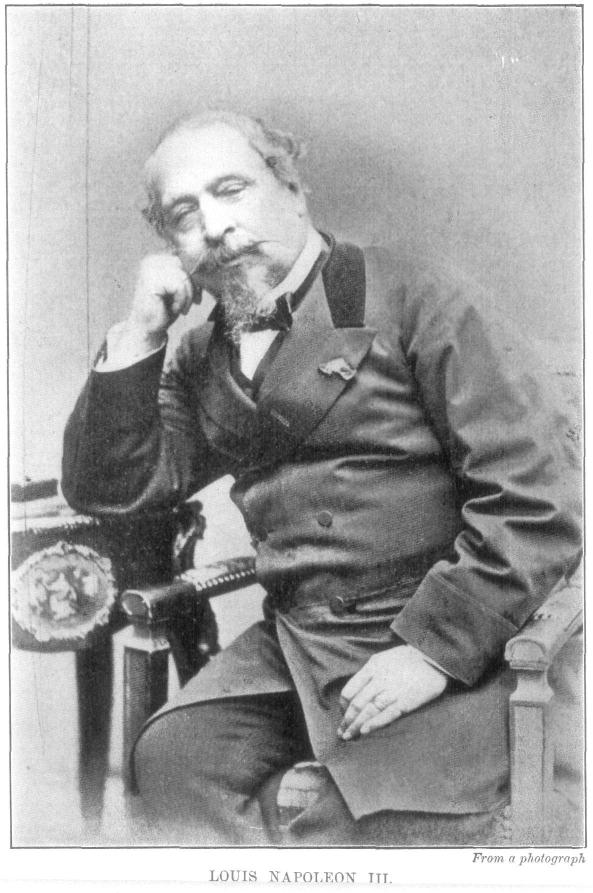
The last photograph of Napoleon III (1872)

From 5 September 1870 until 19 March 1871, Napoleon III and his entourage of thirteen aides were held in comfortable captivity at Schloss Wilhelmshöhe near Kassel, Germany. Eugénie traveled there incognito to visit Napoleon.

General Bazaine, staying in the fortification of Metz with a large part of the remaining French Army while being besieged, had secret talks with Bismarck's envoys on 23 September. The idea was for Bazaine to establish a conservative regime in France, for himself or for Napoleon's son. Bazaine's envoy, who spoke to Bismarck at Versailles on 14 October, declared that the army in Metz was still loyal to Napoleon. Bazaine was willing to take over power in France after the Germans had defeated the republic in Paris. Because of the weakening of the French position overall, Bismarck lost interest in this option.

On 27 November, Napoleon composed a memorandum to Bismarck that raised the possibility that the Prussian king might urge the French people to recall him as Emperor after a peace treaty was signed and Paris surrendered. But by this time, Metz had already fallen, leaving Napoleon without a power base. Bismarck did not see much chance for a restored empire, as the French people would consider Napoleon a mere marionette of the enemy. One last initiative from Eugénie failed in January, because of the late arrival of her envoy from London. Bismarck refused to acknowledge the former empress, as this had caused irritations with Britain and Russia. Shortly afterwards, the Germans signed a truce with the Government of France.

Napoleon continued to write political tracts and letters and dreamed of a return to power. Bonapartist candidates participated in the first elections for the National Assembly on 8 February but won only five seats. On 1 March, the newly elected assembly officially declared the removal of the emperor from power and placed all the blame for the French defeat squarely on him. When peace was arranged between France and Germany, Bismarck released Napoleon; the emperor decided to go into exile in Great Britain. Having limited funds, Napoleon sold properties and jewels and arrived in England on 20 March 1871.

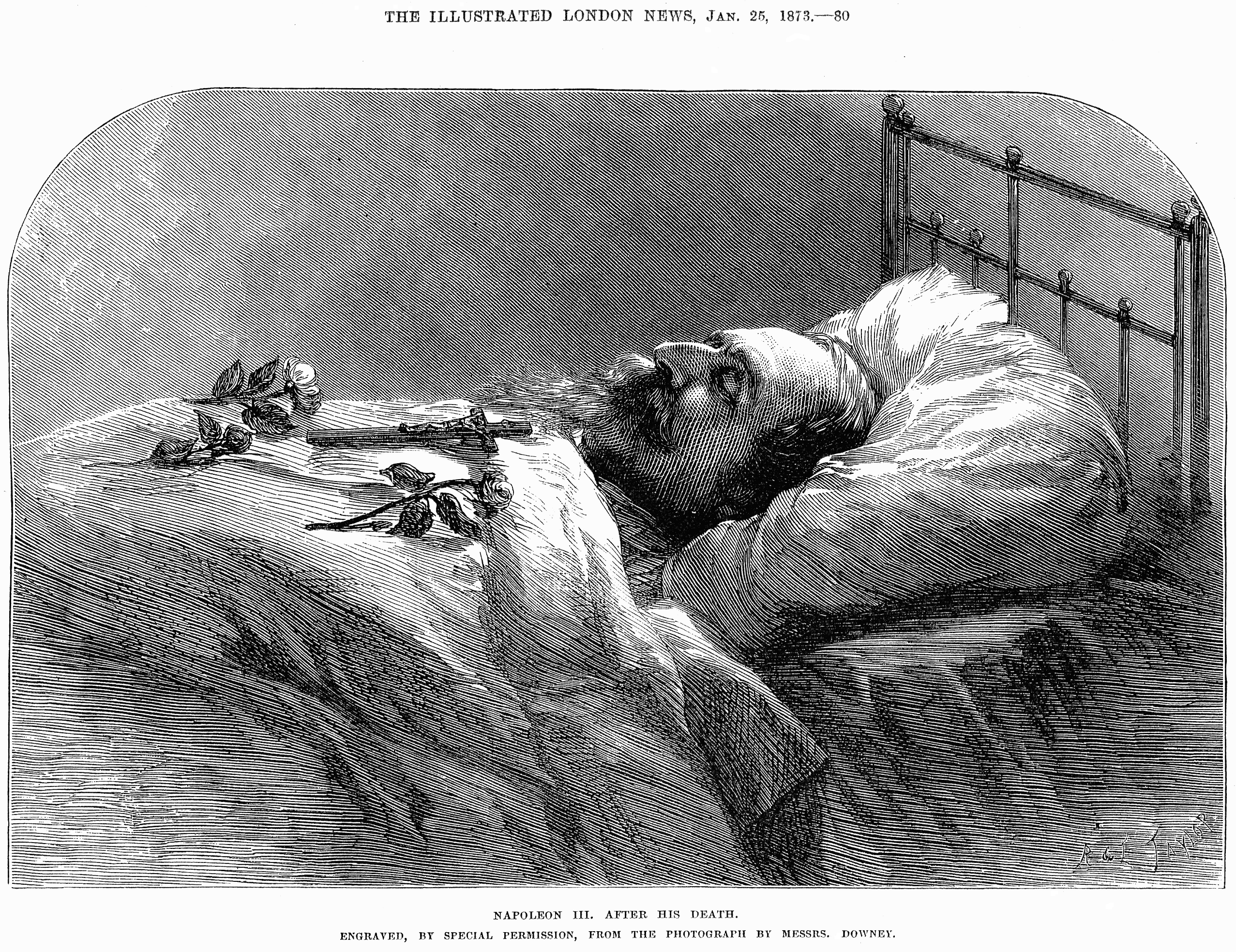
Napoleon III after his death, wood-engraving in The Illustrated London News of 25 January 1873, after a photograph by Mssrs. Downey

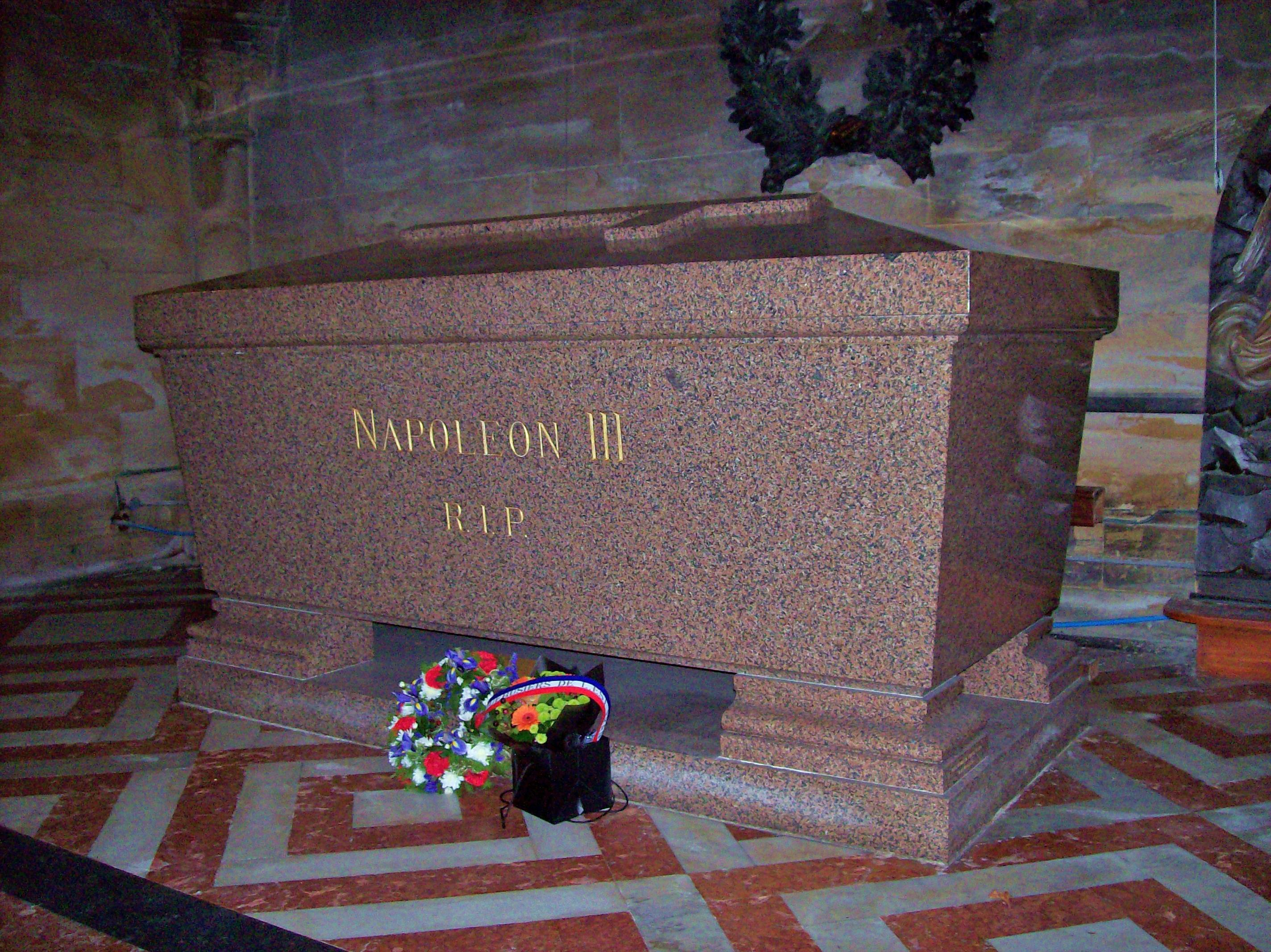
Tomb of Napoleon III

Napoleon, Eugénie, their son and their entourage, settled at Camden Place, a large three-story country house in the village of Chislehurst in Kent, a half-hour by train from London. He was received by Queen Victoria, who also visited him at Chislehurst.

Louis-Napoleon had a longtime connection with Chislehurst and Camden Place: years earlier, while exiled in Great Britain, he had often visited Emily Rowles, whose father had owned Camden Place in the 1830s. She had assisted his escape from a French prison in 1846.

Napoleon passed his time writing and designing a stove which would be more energy efficient. In the summer of 1872, his health began to worsen. Doctors recommended surgery to remove his bladder stones. After two operations, he became very seriously ill. His final defeat in the war would haunt the dying former emperor throughout his last days. His last words were "Isn't it true that we weren't cowards at Sedan?", directed at Henri Conneau, his attendant who fought in the battle alongside him. He was given last rites and died on 9 January 1873.

Napoleon was originally buried at St Mary's Catholic Church in Chislehurst. However, after his son, an officer in the British Army, died in 1879 fighting against the Zulus in South Africa in the Anglo-Zulu War, Eugénie decided to build a monastery and a chapel for the remains of Napoleon III and their son. In 1888, the bodies were moved to the Imperial Crypt at St Michael's Abbey, Farnborough, Hampshire, England.

== Personal life ==
Louis Napoleon has a historical reputation as a womanizer, yet he said: "It is usually the man who attacks. As for me, I defend myself, and I often capitulate." He had many mistresses. During his reign, it was the task of Count Felix Bacciochi, his social secretary, to arrange for trysts and to procure women for the Emperor's favours. His affairs were not trivial sideshows: they distracted him from governing, affected his relationship with the empress, and diminished him in the views of the other European courts.

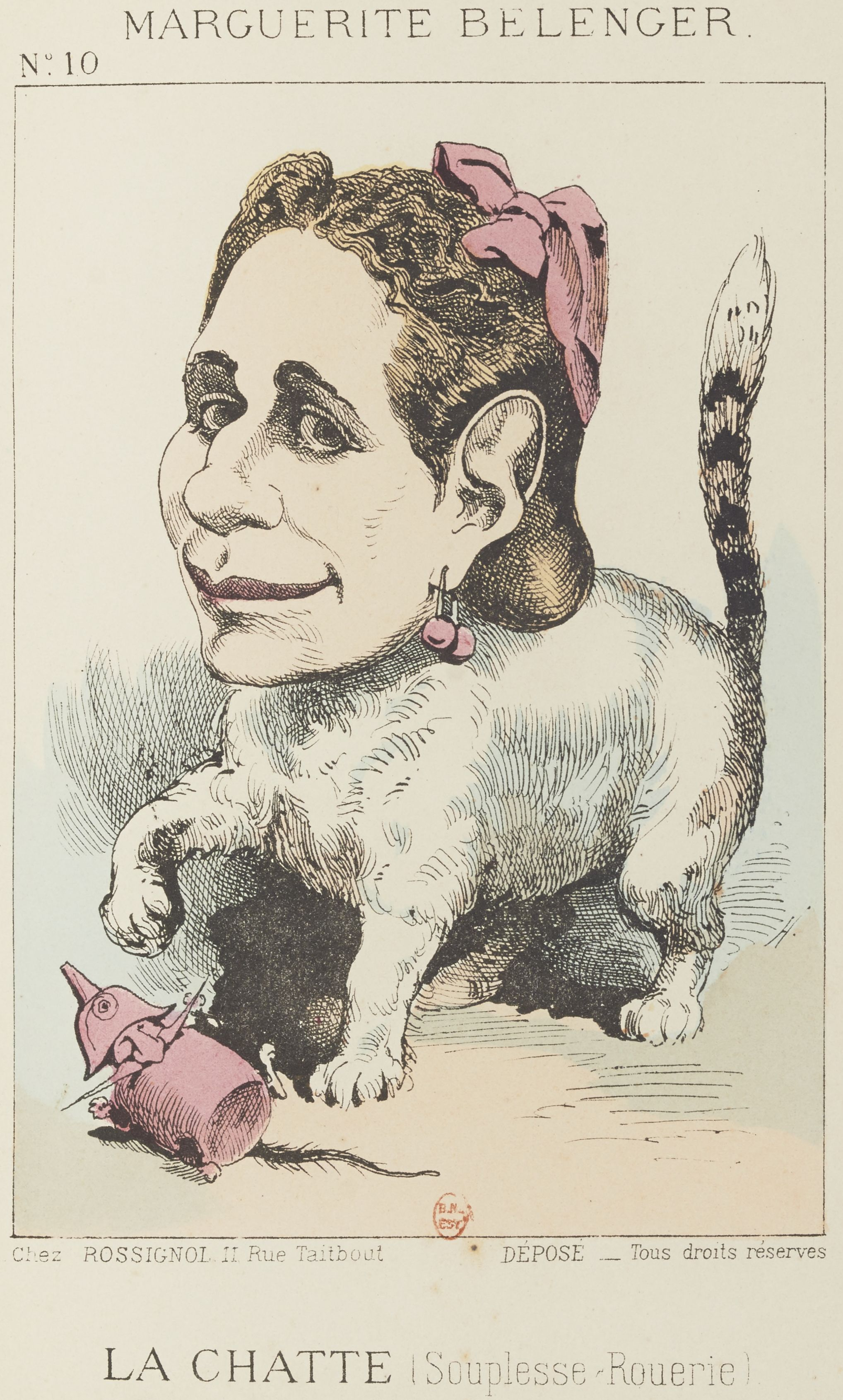
Paul Hadol's caricature of Marguerite Bellanger toying with Napoleon

Among his numerous lovers and mistresses were:

- Maria Anna Schiess (1812–1880), of Allensbach (Lake Constance, Germany), mother of his son Bonaventure Karrer (1839–1921).
- Mary Louisa Edwards (1814–1894), his mistress in London from 1839 to 1840. Louis Napoleon styled her "Comtesse d'Espel" and set her up at Brasted Place, Kent. She played a role in the organization of his failed coup attempt in Boulogne, in August 1840. She visited him in prison at Ham, in 1840 and 1841.
- Eléonore Vergeot, laundress in the prison at Ham, and mother of his sons Eugène Bure (1843–1910) and Alexandre Bure (1845–1882).
- Elisa-Rachel Felix (1821–1858), the "most famous actress in Europe."
- Harriet Howard (1823–1865), a wealthy actress and major financial backer.
- Virginia Oldoini, Countess of Castiglione (1837–1899), a spy, artist and famous beauty, sent by Camillo Cavour to influence the Emperor's politics.
- Marie-Anne Walewska (1823–1912), a possible mistress, who was the wife of Count Alexandre Colonna-Walewski, his relative and foreign minister.
- Justine Marie Le Boeuf, also known as Marguerite Bellanger (1838–1886), an actress and acrobatic dancer. Bellanger was falsely rumoured to be the illegitimate daughter of a hangman, and she was the most universally loathed of the mistresses, although perhaps his favourite.
- Countess Louise de Mercy-Argenteau (1837–1890), likely a platonic relationship, author of The Last Love of an Emperor, her reminiscences of her association with the emperor.

His wife, Eugénie, resisted his advances prior to marriage. She was coached by her mother and her friend, Prosper Mérimée. "What is the road to your heart?" Napoleon demanded to know. "Through the chapel, Sire," she answered. Yet, after marriage, it took not long for him to stray as Eugénie found sex with him "disgusting". It is doubtful that she allowed further approaches by her husband once she had given him an heir (Louis-Napoléon).

By his late forties, Napoleon started to suffer from numerous medical ailments, including kidney disease, bladder stones, chronic bladder and prostate infections, arthritis, gout, obesity, and the chronic effects of smoking. In 1856, Dr. Robert Ferguson, a consultant called from London, diagnosed a "nervous exhaustion" that had a "debilitating impact upon sexual ... performance" which he also reported to the British government.

== Legacy ==
=== Construction ===
With Prosper Mérimée, Napoleon III continued to seek the preservation of numerous medieval buildings in France that had been neglected since the beginning of the French Revolution, a project Mérimée had begun during the July Monarchy. With Eugène Viollet-le-Duc acting as chief architect, many buildings were saved, including some of the most famous in France: Notre Dame Cathedral, Mont Saint-Michel, Carcassonne, Vézelay Abbey, Pierrefonds, and Roquetaillade castle.

Napoleon III also directed the building of the French railway network, which contributed to the development of the coal mining and steel industry in France. This advance radically changed the nature of the French economy, which entered the modern age of large-scale capitalism. The French economy, the second largest in the world at the time (behind the British economy), experienced a very strong growth during the reign of Napoleon III. Names such as steel tycoon Eugène Schneider and banking mogul James de Rothschild are symbols of the period. Two of France's largest banks, Société Générale and Crédit Lyonnais, still in existence today, were founded during that period. The French stock market also expanded prodigiously, with many coal mining and steel companies issuing stocks. Historians credit Napoleon chiefly for supporting the railways, but not otherwise building the economy.

Napoleon's military pressure and Russian mistakes, culminating in the Crimean War, dealt a blow to the Concert of Europe, since it precipitated a war that disrupted the post-Napoleonic peace, although the ultimately diplomatic solution to the war demonstrated the continued vitality of the system. The concert was based on stability and balance of powers, whereas Napoleon attempted to rearrange the world map to France's advantage.

A 12-pound cannon designed by France is commonly referred to as a "Napoleon cannon" or "12-pounder Napoleon" in his honor.

=== Assessment and reputation ===
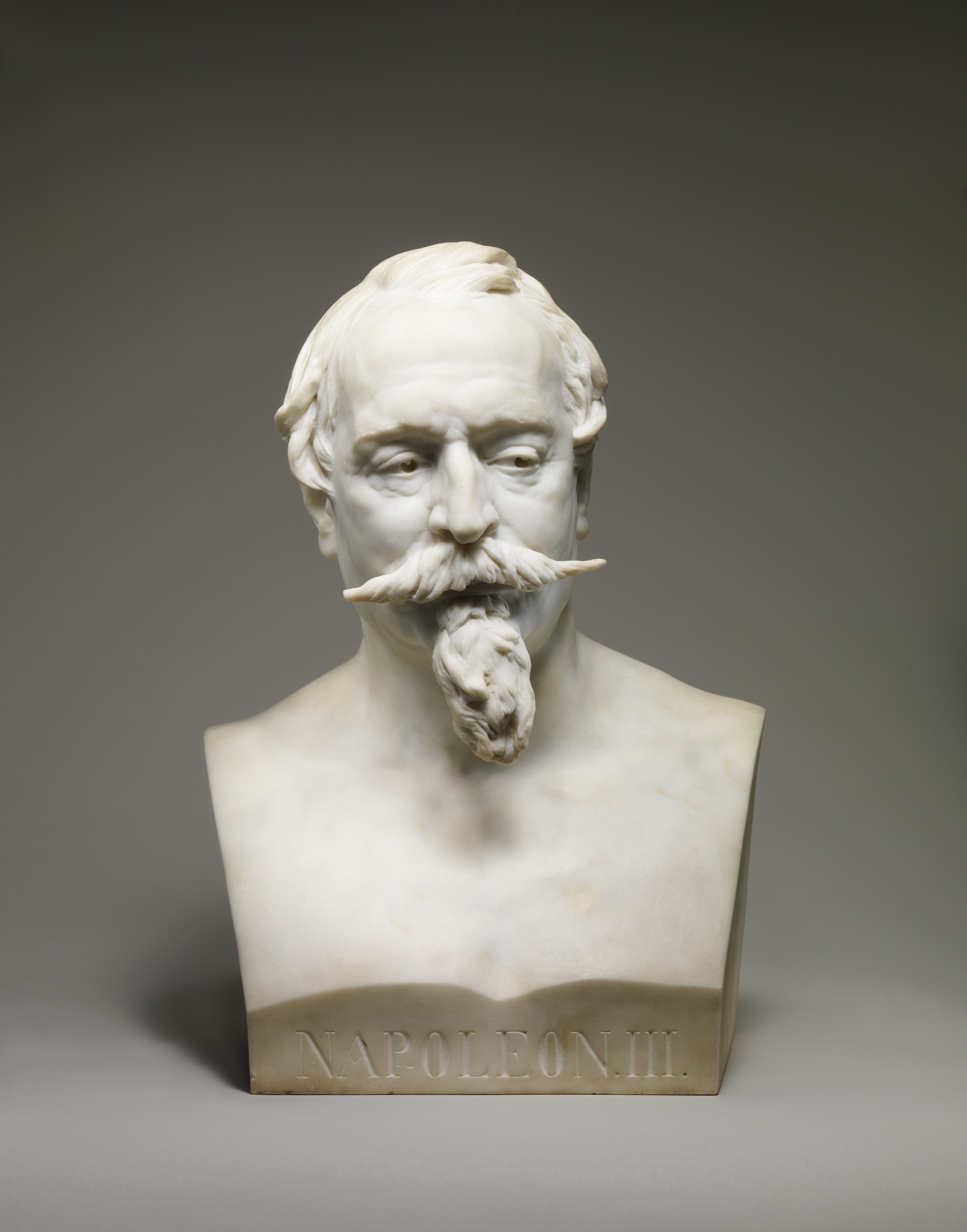
Bust of Napoleon III, by Jean-Baptiste Carpeaux, c. 1873

The historical reputation of Napoleon III is far below that of his uncle and had been heavily tarnished by the empire's military failures in Mexico and against Prussia. Victor Hugo portrayed him as "Napoleon the Small" (Napoléon le Petit), a mere mediocrity, in contrast with Napoleon I "The Great", presented as a military and administrative genius. Karl Marx, in The Eighteenth Brumaire of Louis Napoleon, famously mocked Napoleon III by saying "Hegel remarks somewhere that all great world-historical facts and personages appear, so to speak, twice. He forgot to add: the first time as tragedy, the second time as farce." Napoleon III has often been seen as an authoritarian but ineffectual leader who brought France into dubious, and ultimately disastrous, foreign military adventures.

Historians by the 1930s saw the French Second Empire as a precursor of fascism, but by the 1950s they were celebrating it as a leading example of a modernizing regime. However, historians have generally given Napoleon III negative evaluations on his French foreign policy, and somewhat more positive evaluations of his domestic policies, especially after he liberalized his rule after 1858. His greatest achievements came in material improvements, in the form of a grand railway network that facilitated commerce and tied the nation together and centered it on Paris. He is given high credits for the rebuilding of Paris with broad boulevards, striking public buildings, very attractive residential districts for upscale Parisians, and great public parks, including the Bois de Boulogne and Bois de Vincennes, used by all classes of Parisians. He promoted French business and exports. In international policy, he tried to emulate his uncle (Napoleon I), with numerous imperial ventures elsewhere, as well with wars throughout Europe. He badly mishandled the threat from Prussia and found himself without allies in the face of overwhelming force.

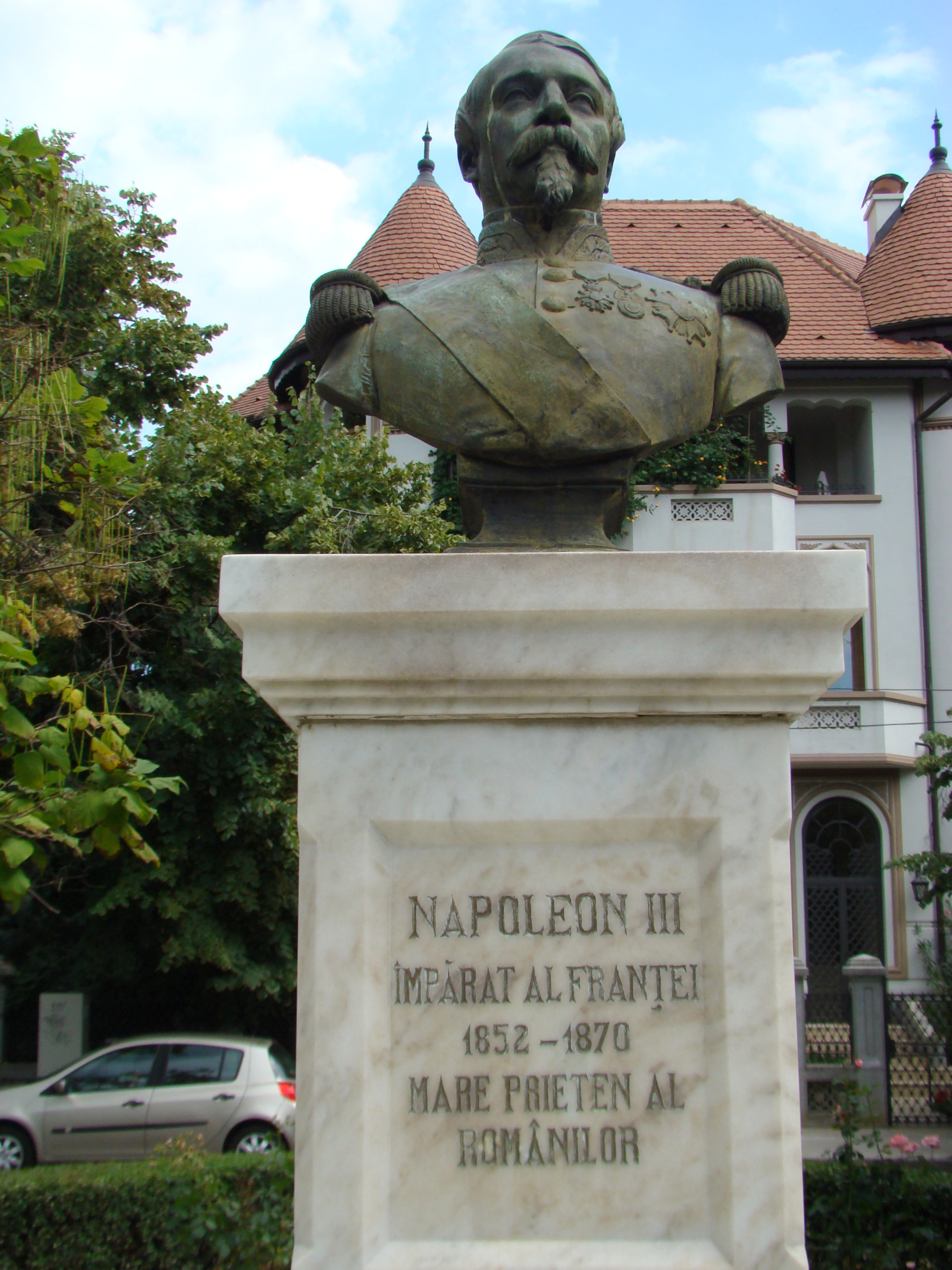
Bust of Napoleon III in Bucharest, Romania

=== In films ===
Napoleon has been portrayed by:

- Walter Kingsford in
  - The Story of Louis Pasteur (1936)
  - A Dispatch from Reuter's (1940)
- Frank Vosper in Spy of Napoleon (1936)
- Guy Bates Post in
  - Maytime (1937)
  - The Mad Empress (1939)
- Leon Ames in Suez (1938)
- Claude Rains in Juarez (1939)
- Walter Franck in Bismarck (1940)
- Jerome Cowan in The Song of Bernadette (1943)
- David Bond in The Sword of Monte Cristo (1951)
- Siegfried Wischnewski in Maximilian von Mexiko (1970).
- Robert Dumont in Those Years (Spanish: Aquellos años, 1973).
- Julian Sherrier in Edward the Seventh (1975)
- Nick Jameson in The Secret Diary of Desmond Pfeiffer (1998)
- Erwin Steinhauer in Sisi (2009).
- Christophe Malavoy in Ludwig II (2012)

Napoleon III also plays a small but crucial role in April and the Extraordinary World (2015).

=== In fiction ===
Napoleon III is a principal character (with Horatio Hornblower) in C. S. Forester's final story The Last Encounter. Life in the Second Empire is depicted in Emile Zola's epic Rougon-Macquart cycle of 20 novels. Napoleon III appears in La Curée (1872), when the Saccards attend a ball at the Tuileries.

== Titles, styles, honours and arms ==
=== Titles and styles ===
During his tenure as President of the Second French Republic, Louis Napoleon Bonaparte adopted the style and title of "His Imperial Highness, the Prince-President of the French Republic". Once he became emperor, his style and title became " His Imperial Majesty Napoleon The Third, by the Grace of God and the Will of the Nation, Emperor of the French".

As head of state of France, Napoleon III was also ex officio Co-Prince of Andorra, from 1848 as Prince-President of the French Republic, and from 1852 as Emperor of the French.

=== Honours ===
National

- Grand Cross of the Legion of Honour, (1848; in diamonds 1870,)
- Médaille militaire, (1852; in diamonds 1870,)
- Commemorative medal of the 1859 Italian Campaign, (in diamonds 1870,)

Foreign

- (Kingdom of Sardinia) Sardinia:
  - Knight of the Order of the Annunciation, 13 July 1849
  - Grand Cross of the Military Order of Savoy, 28 September 1855
  - Gold Medal of Military Valor, 1859
- Holy See: Grand Cross of the Order of Pope Pius IX, 1849
- Tuscany: Grand Cross of the Order of St. Joseph, 1850
- Spain: Knight of the Order of the Golden Fleece, 17 September 1850
- Grand Duchy of Hesse: Grand Cross of the Ludwig Order, 18 July 1852
- Portugal:
  - Grand Cross of the Order of the Tower and Sword, 3 August 1852
  - Grand Cross of the Sash of the Three Orders, 7 October 1854
  - Grand Cross of the Order of St. James of the Sword, 3 April 1865
- Saxony: Knight of the Order of the Rue Crown, 29 December 1852
- Brazil: Grand Cross of the Order of the Southern Cross, 23 March 1853
- Bavaria: Knight of the Order of St. Hubert, 22 September 1853
- Mexico:
  - Mexican Republic: Grand Cross of the Order of Guadalupe, 12 January 1854
  - Mexican Empire: Grand Cross of the Imperial Order of the Mexican Eagle, with Collar, 1 January 1865
- Belgium: Grand Cordon of the Order of Leopold, 15 February 1854
- (Saxe-Coburg and Gotha) (Duchy of Saxe-Altenburg) (Saxe-Meiningen) Ernestine duchies: Grand Cross of the Saxe-Ernestine House Order, 1 March 1854
- Austria: Grand Cross of the Order of St. Stephen, 1854
- Two Sicilies: Grand Cross of the Order of Saint Ferdinand and of Merit, 1854
- United Kingdom: Knight of the Order of the Garter, 18 April 1855
- Denmark: Knight of the Order of the Elephant, 2 August 1855
- Netherlands: Grand Cross of the Military William Order, 13 September 1855
- Sweden-Norway:
  - Knight of the Order of the Seraphim, 10 October 1855
  - Knights Grand Cross of the Order of the Sword, 1st Class, 26 August 1861
- Ottoman Empire:
  - Order of the Medjidie, 1st Class, 1855
  - Order of Osmanieh, 1st Class, in Diamonds, 1862
- Baden:
  - Knight of the House Order of Fidelity, 17 April 1856
  - Grand Cross of the Order of the Zähringer Lion, 17 April 1856
- Prussia:
  - Knight of the Order of the Black Eagle, 8 June 1856
  - Grand Cross of the Order of the Red Eagle, 8 June 1856
- Württemberg: Grand Cross of the Order of the Württemberg Crown, 1856
- Russia:
  - Knight of the Order of St. Andrew, 11 June 1856
  - Knight of the Order of St. Alexander Nevsky, 11 June 1856
  - Knight of the Order of the White Eagle, 11 June 1856
  - Knight of the Order of St. Anna, 1st Class, 11 June 1856
- Persia: Grand Cross of the Order of the Lion and the Sun, 1856
- Hesse-Kassel: Knight of the Order of the Golden Lion, 10 January 1858
- Nassau: Knight of the Order of the Golden Lion of Nassau, 2 May 1858
- Hanover:
  - Knight of the Order of St. George, 1860
  - Grand Cross of the Royal Guelphic Order
- Tunisia: Husainid Family Order, 17 September 1860
- Saxe-Weimar-Eisenach: Grand Cross of the Order of the White Falcon, 14 November 1860
- Greece: Grand Cross of the Order of the Redeemer, 1863
- Honduras: Grand Cross of the Order of Santa Rosa and of Civilization, 1869
- Monaco: Grand Cross of the Order of St. Charles, 16 November 1869

== Writings by Napoleon III ==
- Des Idées Napoleoniennes – an outline of Napoleon III's opinion of the optimal course for France, written before he became Emperor.
- History of Julius Caesar – a historical work he wrote during his reign. He drew an analogy between the politics of Julius Caesar and his own, as well as those of his uncle.
- Études sur le passé et l'avenir de l'artillerie – a multi-volume work on the history of artillery. Tomes 1 and 2 are by him; t. 3-6 continued by Idelphonse Favé, with subtitle: Histoire des progrès de l'artillerie.
- Napoleon III wrote a number of articles on military matters, scientific issues (electromagnetism, pros and cons of beet versus cane sugar), historical topics (the Stuart kings of Scotland), and on the feasibility of the Nicaragua canal. His pamphlet The Extinction of Pauperism (OCLC 318651712, JSTOR 60201169) helped his political advancement.

== See also ==
- Bonapartism – French political ideology
- Paris during the Second Empire
- Second Empire style – Eclectic architectural and decorative arts style of the Second French Empire

Napoleon III House of Bonaparte Born: 20 April 1808 Died: 9 January 1873
Political offices
Office established	President of the French Republic; 20 December 1848 – 2 December 1852	Vacant Empire declared Title next held by Adolphe Thiers
Regnal titles
Vacant Title last held by Louis Philippe I as King of the French	Emperor of the French; 2 December 1852 – 4 September 1870	Vacant Republic declared
