= Court uniform and dress in the Empire of Japan =

Formal dress at courtly functions in Japan

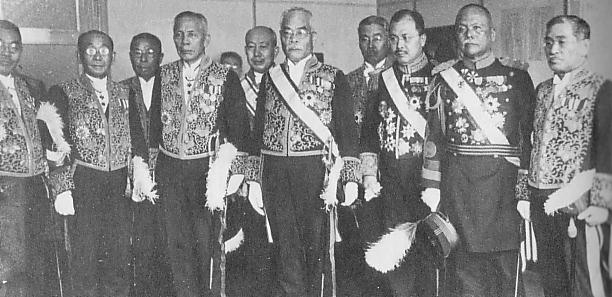
The ministers of the Hamaguchi cabinet in European-style court dress. Most of the members, including Prime Minister Osachi Hamaguchi in the center, are in the uniforms of chokunin-kan officials. Minister of the Army Kazushige Ugaki (second from the right) is in military uniform, while Minister for Foreign Affairs Kijūrō Shidehara (third from the right) is in the uniform of a baron.

The official court dress of the Empire of Japan (大礼服, taireifuku), used from the Meiji period until the end of the Second World War, consisted of European-inspired clothing of the 1870's. It was first introduced at the beginning of the Meiji period and maintained through the institution of the constitutional monarchy by the Meiji Constitution, and represented the highest uniforms in use at the time. Uniforms for members of the kazoku peerage and civil officials were officially set.

== History ==
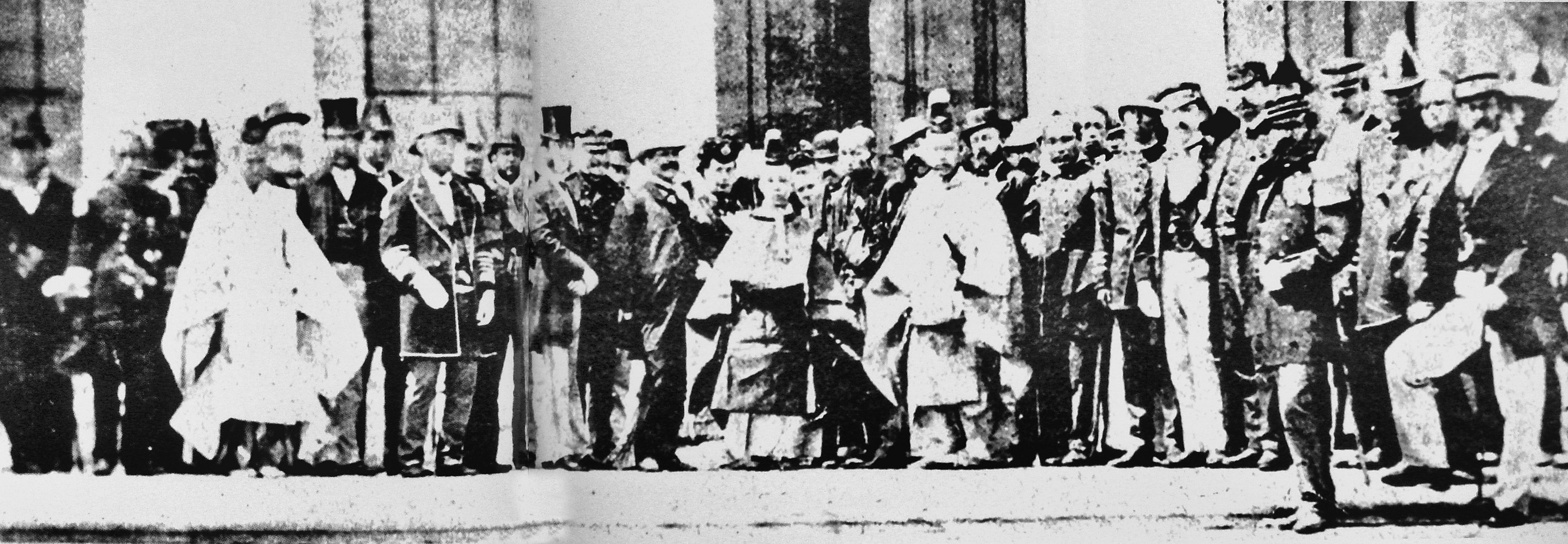
Japanese government officials and foreign representatives at the Japan Mint in 1871. Sanjo Sanetomi in the center is wearing traditional kariginu. Another Japanese man is in a Western-style military uniform and topknot.

When the Meiji Restoration began, those working to build the new government were wearing a diverse array of different clothing based on their social status during the previous Edo period. Nobles had their ikan (衣冠) court wear and informal kariginu (狩衣), samurai had the distinct hitatare (直垂) and kamishimo (裃) dress, and members of Westernized military forces had their Western-style uniforms. For example, during the Emperor's visit to Tokyo in 1868, opinions were divided between the high officials Nakayama Tadayasu and Date Munenari. Nakayama argued that ikan should be worn only when departing and when entering the castle, while kariginu would be worn en route; Date held that kariginu should be worn only when entering the castle, with nōshi (直衣) and hitatare both allowed en route. As a result, it was decided that both kariginu and hitatare would be allowed en route, with ikan also permitted when entering the castle. Furthermore, the colors and designs on the ikan, kariginu, and hitatare were all unique to each individual, destroying the visual unity of the procession. Meanwhile, the soldiers guarding it were dressed in Western-style uniforms, but were not at all accustomed to the clothing. Ernest Satow commented that their slovenly appearances ruined the solemnity of the procession. This lack of uniformity was once again evident on the Emperor's repeat visit the next year.

The situation was clearly untenable, and so after the election of officials to the new government in summer 1869, the Minister of Justice Saga Saneharu was put in charge of the problem. In a meeting of the legislature that winter, Iwakura Tomomi proposed deliberation over the court dress for governmental officials that Saga and his helpers had come up with. However, as this design was based on the former dress of court nobles, it met with opposition from those of samurai descent. In order to resolve this disorder, the Internal Imperial Command on Clothing Reform (服制改革内勅, Fukusei kaikaku naichoku) was released on October 17, 1871. In order to quiet the kazoku still attached to traditional styles of dress, the order claimed that ikan and similar kinds of clothing were weak, and Japan should go back to the styles of the time of Emperor Jimmu and Empress Jingū. The "styles of that time" meant tight sleeves and narrow hakama, and so the order implied that Western-style dress, complying to these standards, had much in common with the essential garb of the Japanese themselves. Calling back to the spirit of Jimmu's legendary founding of the country, it appealed for the creation of a new uniform.

Internal Imperial Command on Clothing Reform (服制改革内勅, fukusei kaikaku naichoku) It is Our view that those who form social mores are transient, subject to the whims of opportunity. Those who form the kokutai control their strength through indomitability. The modern ikan dress has been based on the old dress of the Tang, and is a weak style. We lament this greatly. It is distant from Our roots, ruling by the strength of Japan's warriors. We of the Imperial Line have Ourselves become marshals, and by the people We revere that style. There is nothing of Emperor Jimmu's founding of the country or Empress Jingū's subjugation of Korea in the style of today. We ought not to show such weakness to the world for even one day. I now resolve to revise our uniform and reform our mores, and wish to construct a warrior's kokutai not seen since our ancestors' time. My vassals, give shape to these my wishes.

(朕惟フニ風俗ナル者移換以テ時ノ宜シキニ随ヒ国体ナル者不抜以テ其勢ヲ制ス今衣冠ノ制中古唐制ニ摸倣セシヨリ流テ軟弱ノ風ヲナス朕太タ慨之夫レ神州ノ武ヲ以テ治ムルヤ固ヨリ久シ天子親ラ之カ元帥ト為リ衆庶以テ其風ヲ仰ク神武創業神功征韓ノ如キ決テ今日ノ風姿ニアラス豈一日モ軟弱以テ天下ニ示ス可ケンヤ朕今断然其服制ヲ更メ其風俗ヲ一新シ祖宗以来尚武ノ国体ヲ立ント欲ス汝近臣其レ朕カ意ヲ体セヨ)

On December 12, 1872, the Dajō-kan released an edict implementing regulations for the uniforms of civil officials and nobles, and on December 29 of that year another edict determined regulations for their wearing. The new official uniforms were indeed designed based on the court uniforms used in Europe at the time. The first of these edicts also designated white tie dress as the court dress of choice for those not entitled to any particular court uniform, such as private citizens.

The uniforms for members of the Imperial Family were first decided by an edict of the Dajō-kan on February 22, 1873, and then updated in 1876 and 1911.

After the Peerage Act of July 7, 1884, divided the existing kazoku into five ranks, the Ministry of the Imperial Household further established the uniforms for these new subcategories. On October 29 of the same year, another edict of the Dajō-kan created gown-type court uniforms for senior officials within palace agencies like the Board of Chamberlains and Board of Ceremonies. From 1888 to 1889, various other personnel were outfitted with uniforms and assigned court uniforms. The Imperial Household Agency's uniforms underwent major changes in 1911 and 1928.

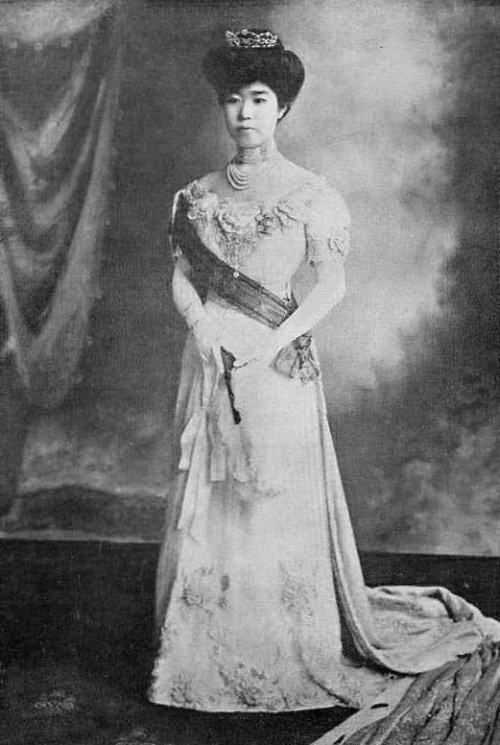
Fusako Kitashirakawa in the manteau de cour

On June 23, 1886, provisions were set to determine formal Western wear for women. In order from most to least formal, these were the manteau de cour, robe décolletée, robe mi-décolletée, and robe montante.

On December 4 of the same year, the designs of the court uniforms for civil officials were modified, but the designs for junior officials were not updated. Because the officials were responsible for providing their own court uniforms, the cost had been too much for junior officials. From this point on, junior civil officials wore standard white tie court dress. The difference in price was extreme: when the official Kikuchi Takeo ordered both a three-piece suit and his court uniform at the same shop, the suit cost 28 yen and the uniform 220 yen.

On March 2, 1908, an Imperial edict established substitute court uniforms for diplomats dispatched to the tropics or very hot areas. Later, on September 29, 1926, another Imperial edict established alternative court uniforms and court dress for Japanese officials in the South Pacific. All of these consisted of white tunics. Old news footage shows officials of the South Seas Mandate, including Kōki Hirota, in these clothes.

Although their names differed, naval and military officers also had dress corresponding to court uniforms. Unlike civil officials, military officials were allowed to wear their uniforms to personal ceremonies such as marriages and funerals.

These various kinds of court uniforms continued to be used at court functions and ceremonies even into the Shōwa period, at events like the Imperial enthronement and the Duke of Gloucester' visit or the first visit of Emperor of Manchukuo Puyi to Japan. However, as the strain of war continued, opportunities for their use became rarer and rarer. On July 2, 1938, the Imperial Household Agency announced its policy to stop wearing robes by simplifying court ceremonies while the 'Incident' continued, and accordingly the court uniforms disappeared from public view.

When Mitsumasa Yonai became Prime Minister during the Second Sino-Japanese War, his morning dress could not be tailored in time for the appointment, and he wore a naval uniform in its place at his official investiture. (Note: Concerned that becoming prime minister while still an active naval officer would infringe upon the Emperor's supreme command authority, Yonai transferred to the first reserve. His naval full uniform is on display at the Morioka Memorial Museum of Great Predecessors.)

After the war, Imperial Household Agency edicts and the pertinent Dajō-kan edicts were abolished, on May 2, 1947, and July 1, 1954, respectively. The Empire of Japan's court uniforms disappeared with them, but similar male uniforms do remain in use around the world, including in France, various South American countries, and Thailand.

== Court uniforms for civil officials ==
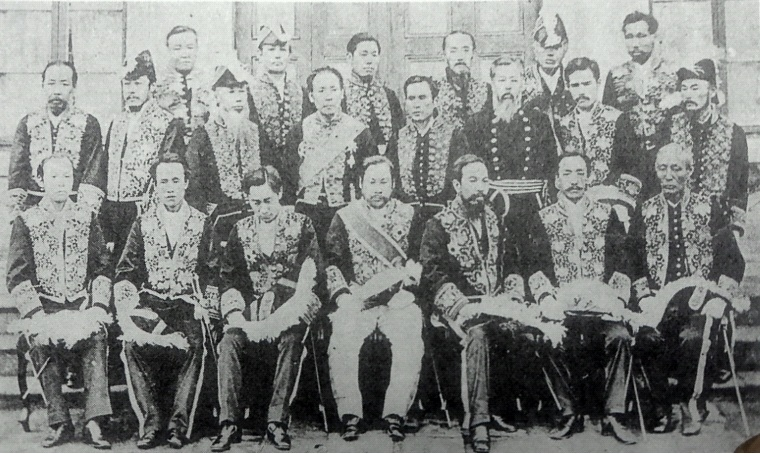
Genrōin members in 1879, wearing various court uniforms for civil officials by the 1872 designs

Three of the highest subcategories of civil officials were allocated specific court uniforms: Imperial appointees (勅任官, chokuninkan), non-Imperially appointed senior officials (奏任官, sōninkan), and junior officials (判任官, hanninkan).

These uniforms were officially decided by edict of the Dajō-kan on December 12, 1872. The Iwakura Mission, which had departed Japan earlier, also gathered information on uniform design via Hayashi Tadasu. However, the mission had no time to wait for a final decision before an audience with Queen Victoria. They therefore ordered uniforms in England, based on the designs they had been discussing with the homeland. Unfortunately, the designs they reported back were determined to be impossible to create in Japan's still-immature Western clothing stores and were not adopted directly. The versions ultimately decreed by the Dajō-kan differed considerably from the Iwakura mission's prototypes. The Dajō-kan's edicts were still incomplete as a form of law, and the details of the original edict itself were in some areas insufficient, so variations were visible depending on the manufacturer.

There were also problems with the uniforms themselves. The pants for chokuninkan were designated as being white, but in Europe white pants were only worn in court uniforms on special occasions. This issue was even pointed out by Otto von Bismarck when the Iwakura mission visited Germany. On September 18, 1877, an edict of the Dajō-kan brought these pants into line with the coats, changing them to the same black wool material.

Aiming to set clear and unified standards for the uniforms, the regulations were amended on December 4, 1886, by an order of the Ministry of the Imperial Household. Pictures and diagrams were published in an official telegram, and related manufacturers were provided with sample illustrations printed in color.

The amendment was targeted at the uniforms for senior officials. Those of junior officials were not addressed and instead died out. A minor amendment from the same office on December 10, 1892, modified the side decorations on the uniforms of sōninkan. Correspondence between the Cabinet's chief clerk Kawasaki Takashi and Under-Secretary of the Army Hajime Sugiyama suggests that further modifications to civil officials' uniforms were being considered at the time of the 1928 changes to the uniforms of the Imperial Household Agency.

Accompanying diagrams to the 1872 Dajō-kan edict

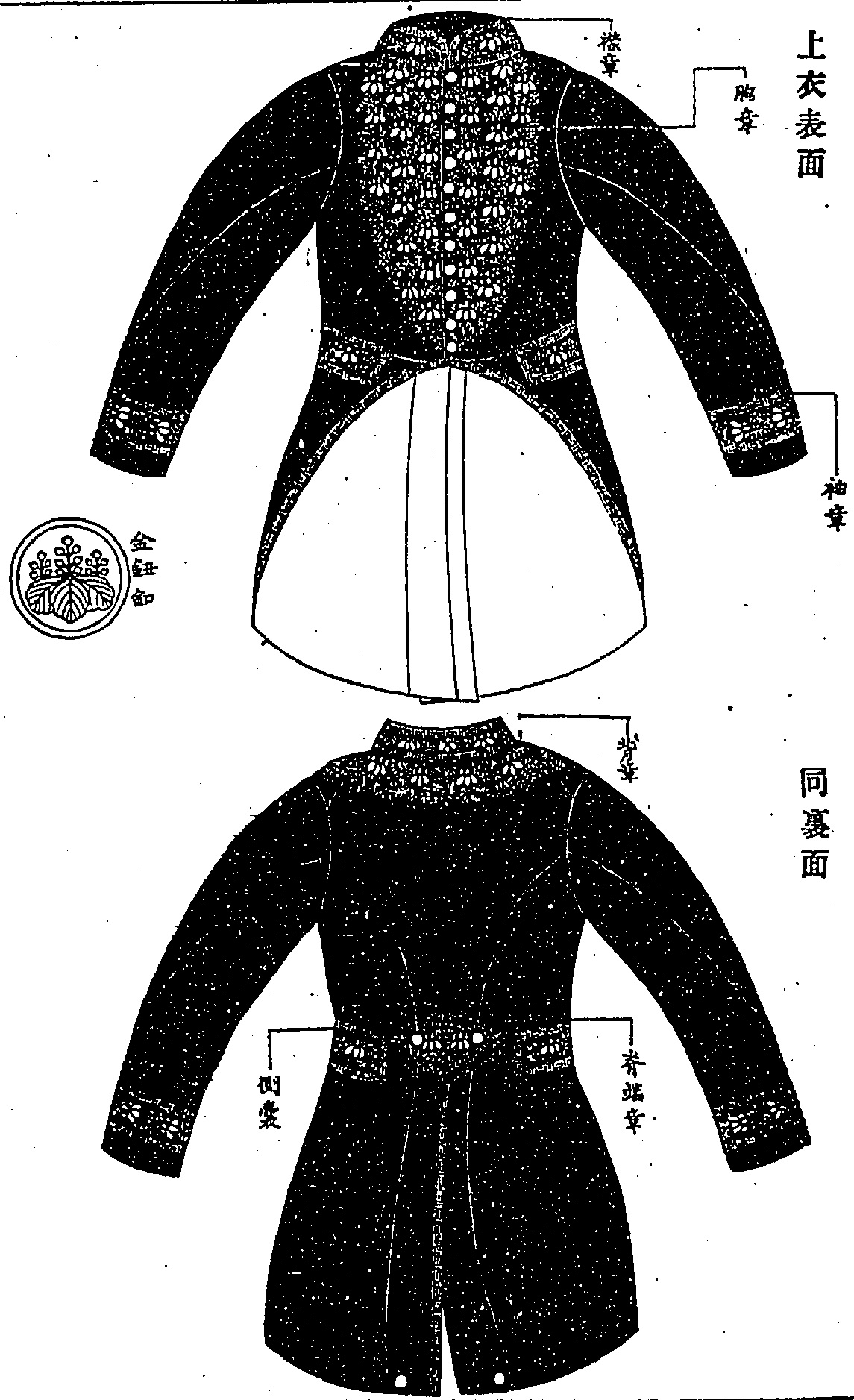
Chokuninkan

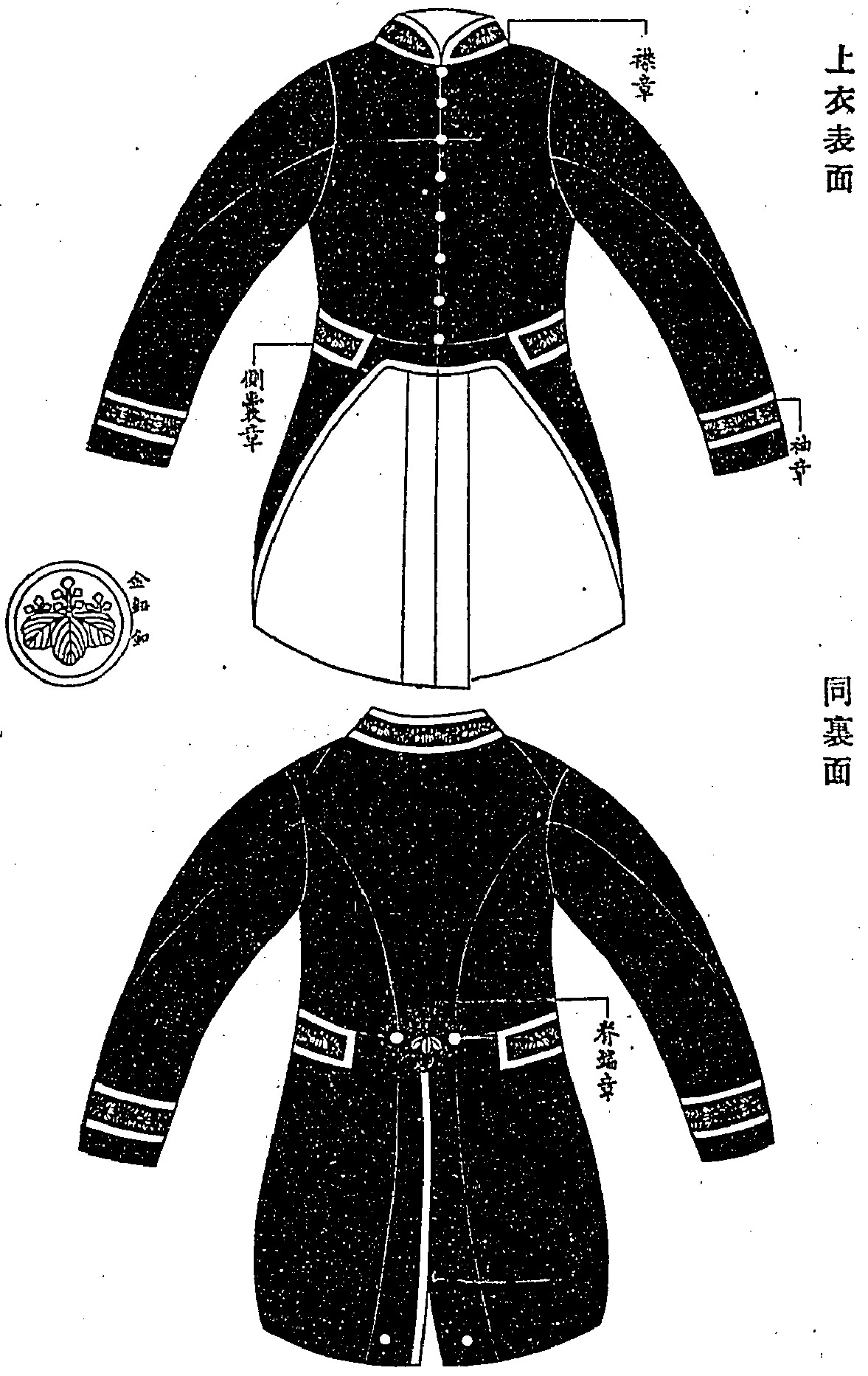
Sōninkan

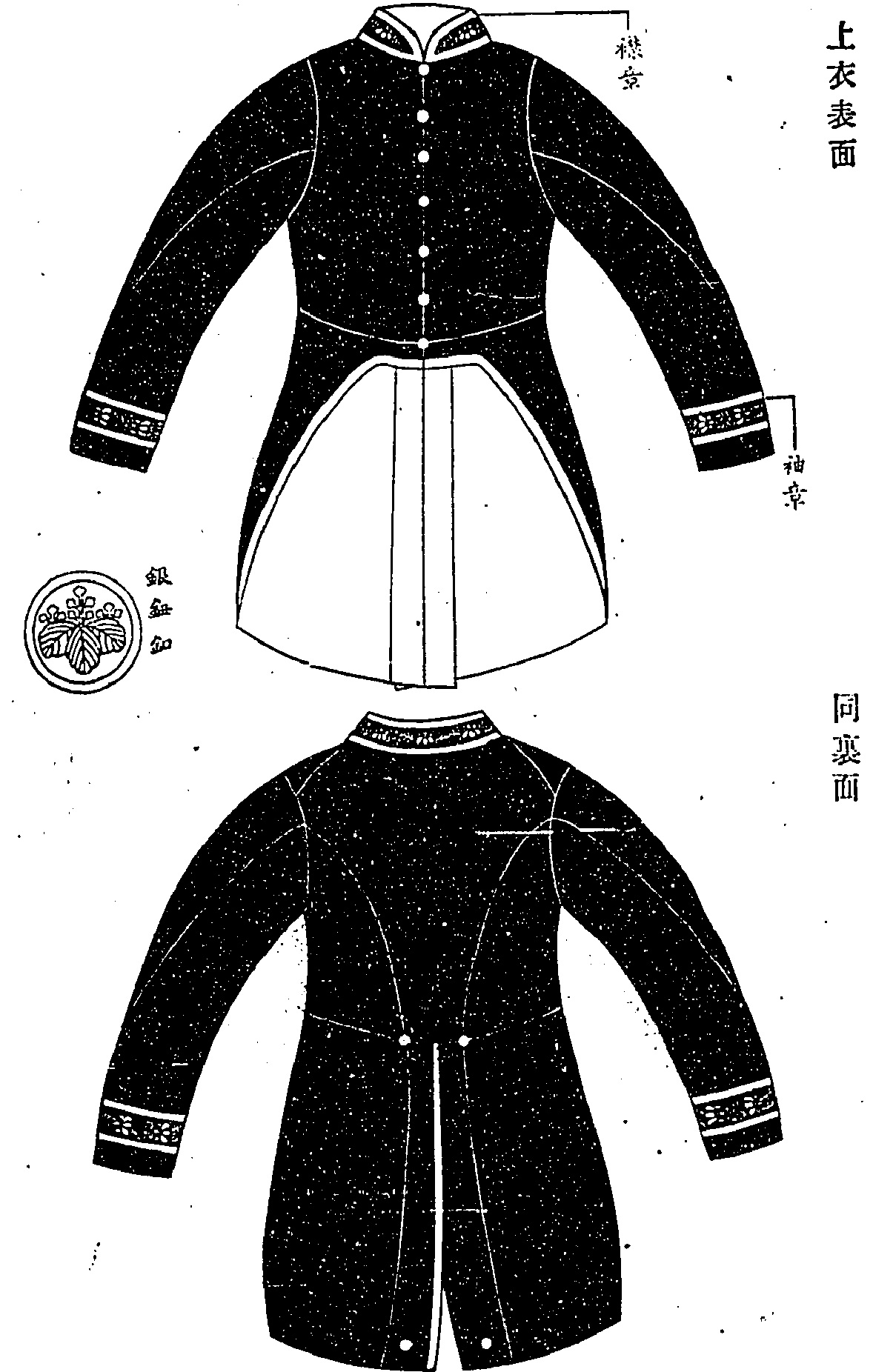
Hanninkan
Accompanying diagrams to the 1886 order of the Ministry of the Imperial Household

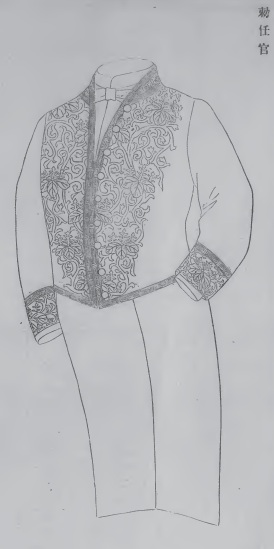
Chokuninkan

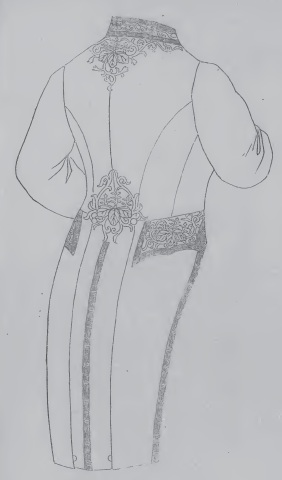
Chokuninkan

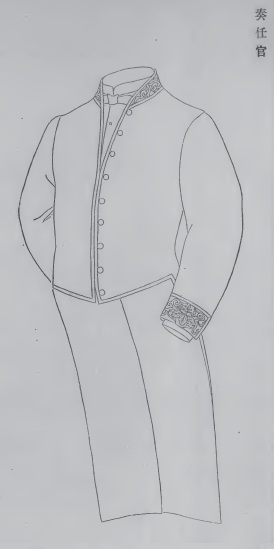
Sōninkan

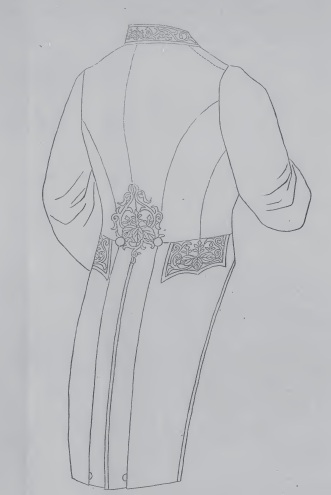
Sōninkan
Alternate diagrams for the 1886 order of the Ministry of the Imperial Household

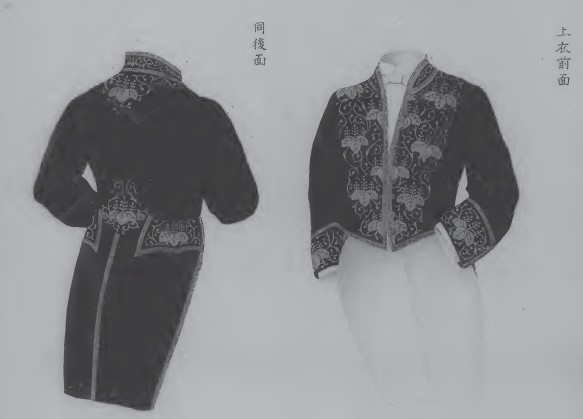
Chokuninkan

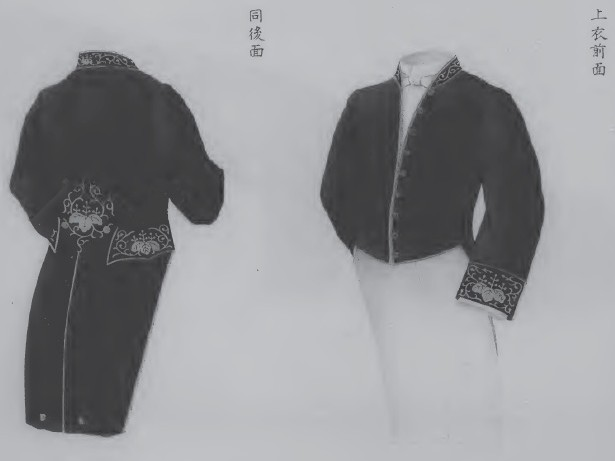
Sōninkan

=== Court uniforms to the 1872 Dajō-kan standard ===
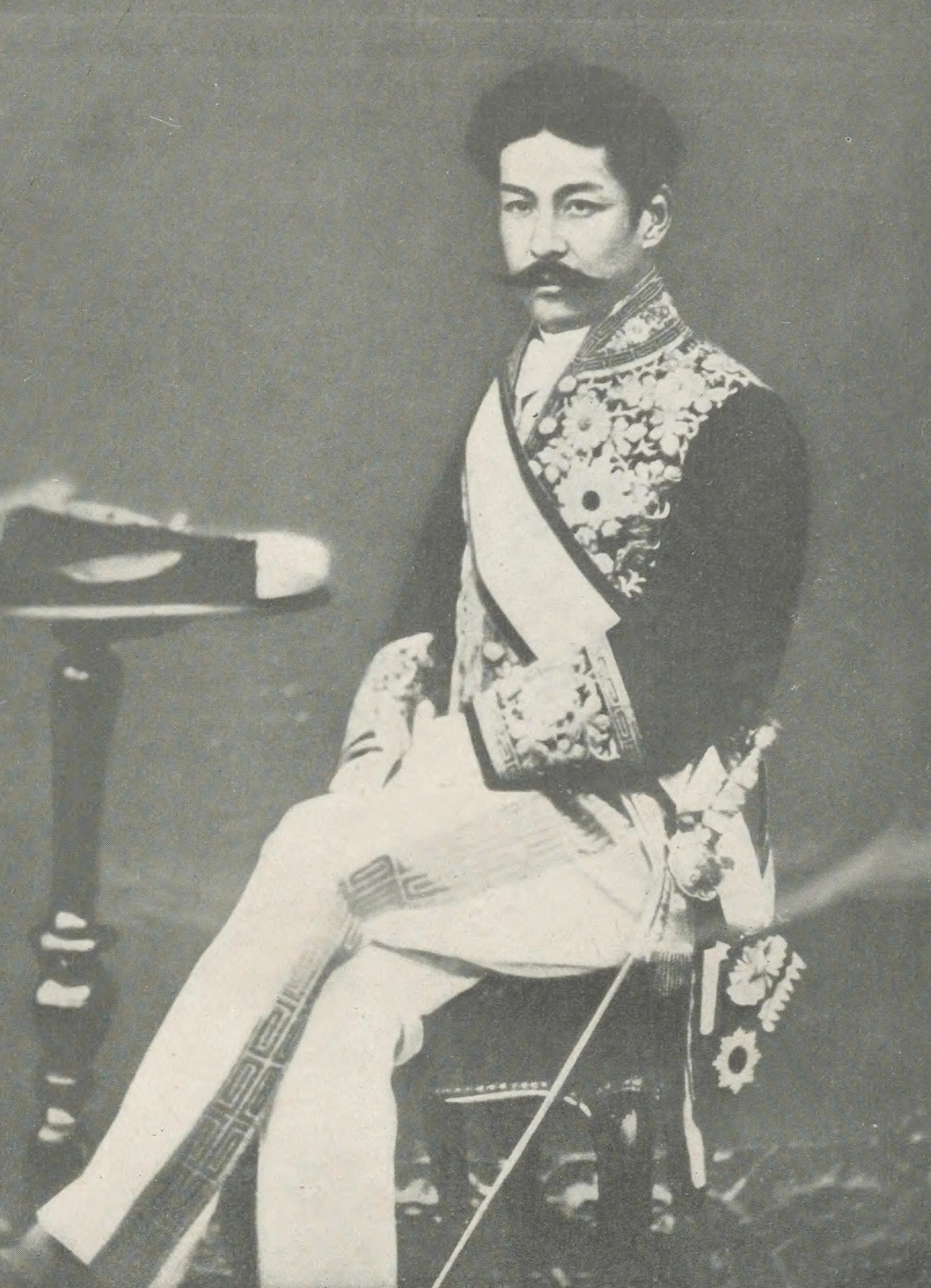
Prince Kitashirakawa Yoshihisa

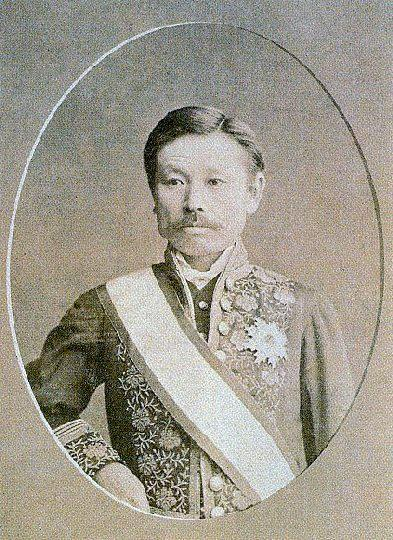
Inoue Kaoru

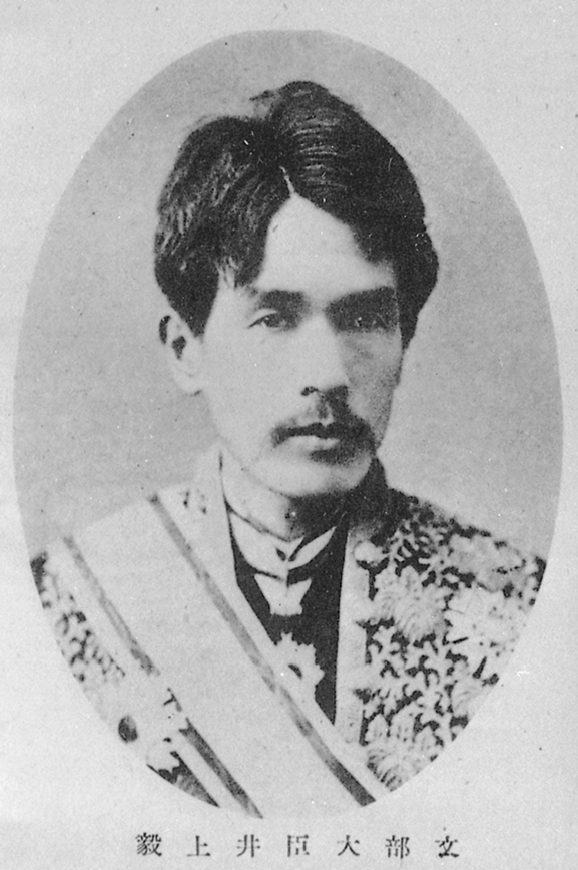
Inoue Kowashi

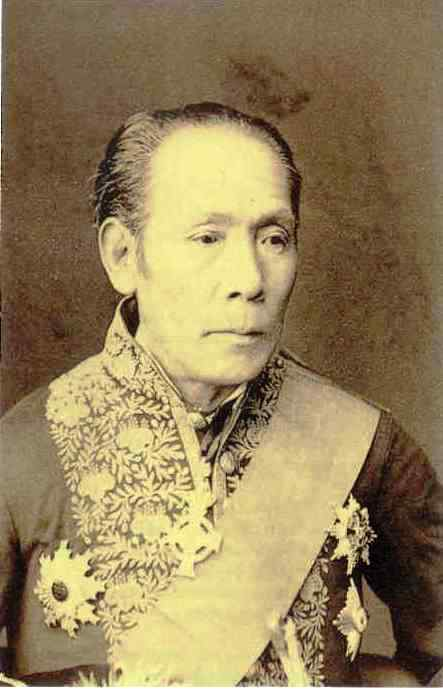
Sano Tsunetami

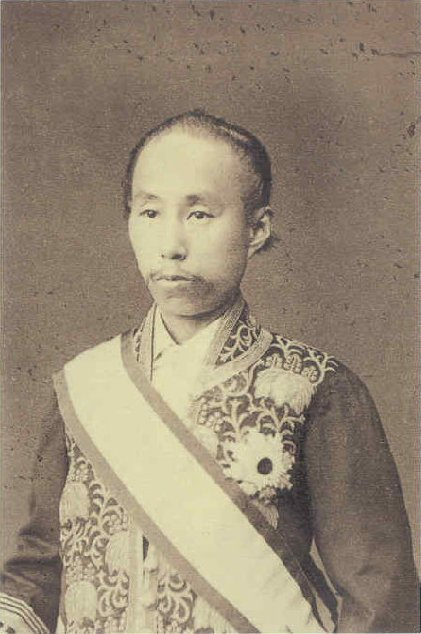
Sanjō Sanetomi

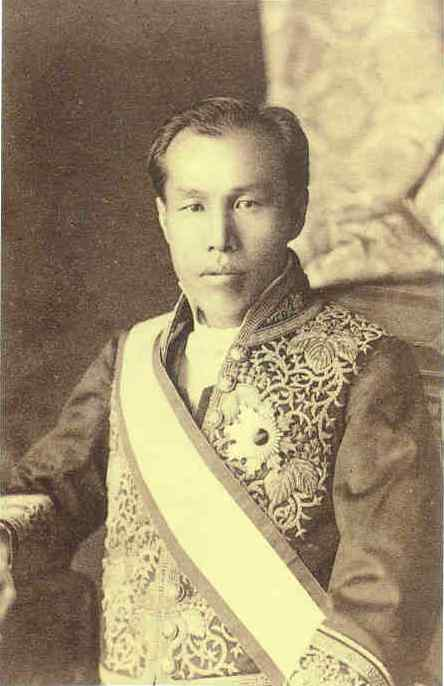
Ōkuma Shigenobu

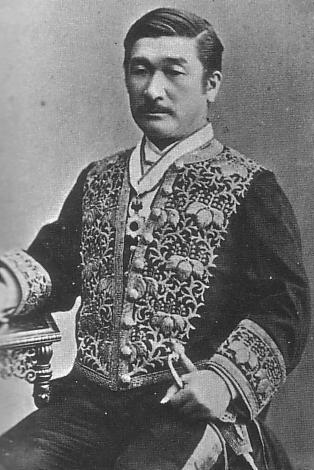
Ishida Eikichi

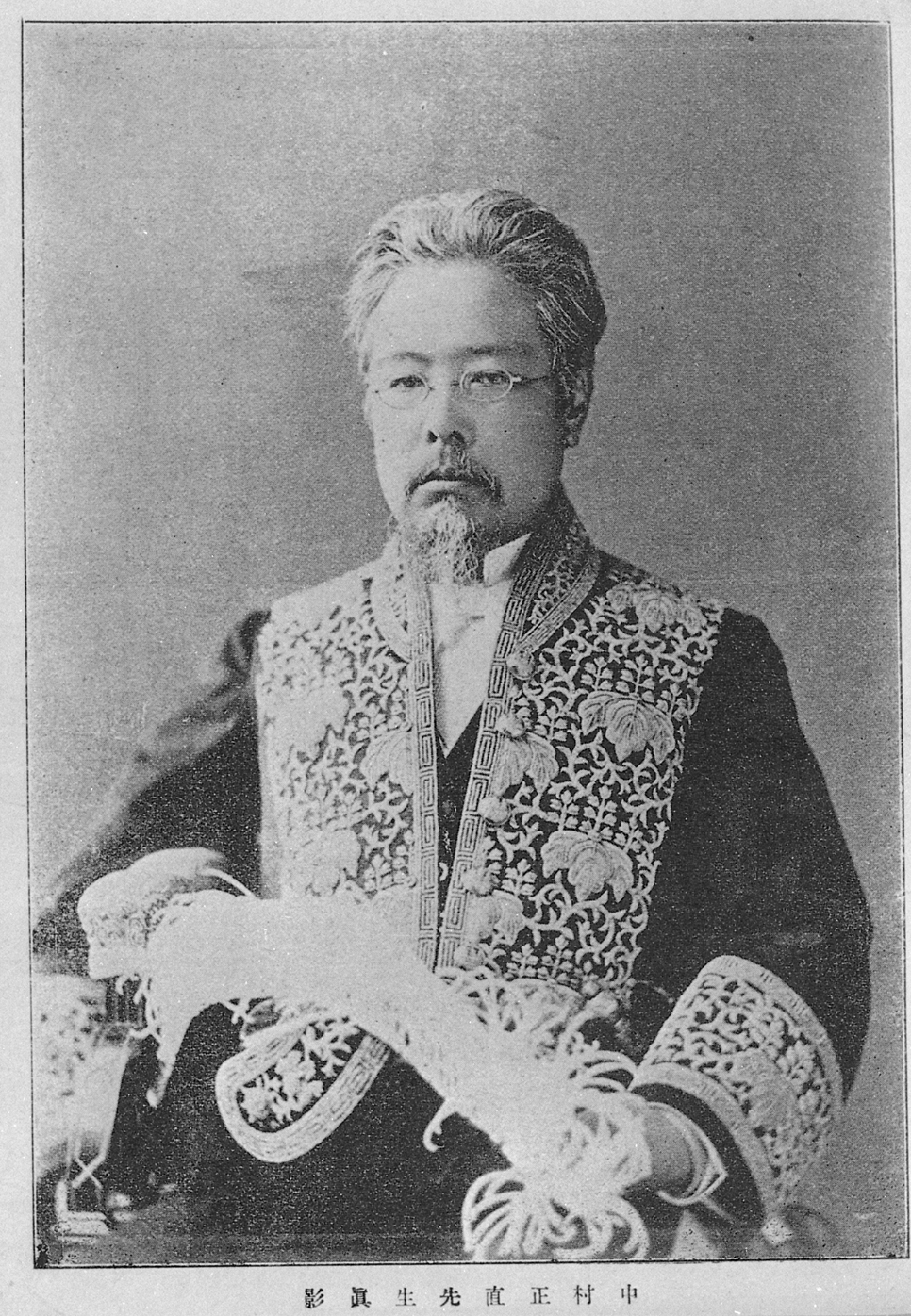
Nakamura Masanao

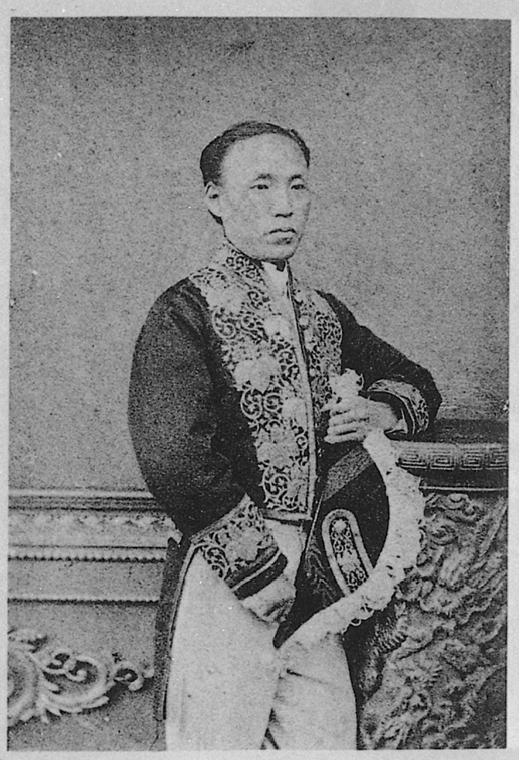
Maejima Hisoka

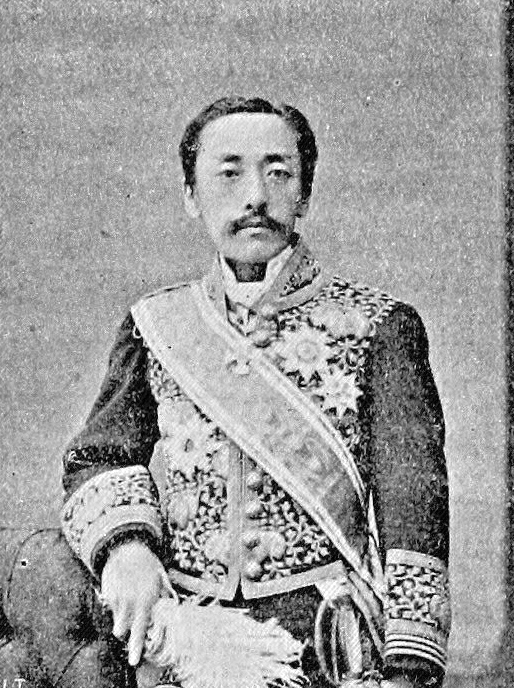
Matsudaira Norikata

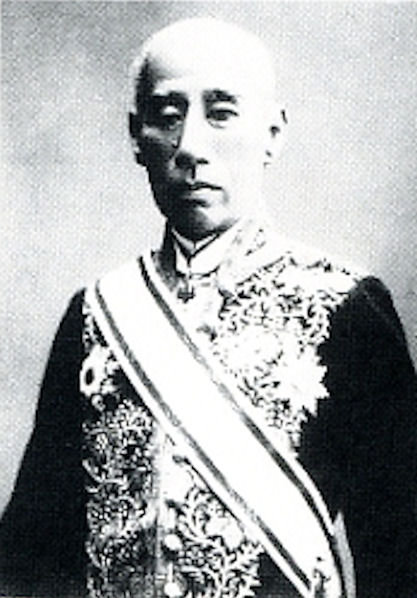
Date Munenari

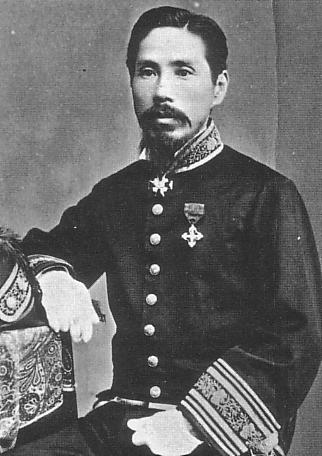
Utsumi Tadakatsu

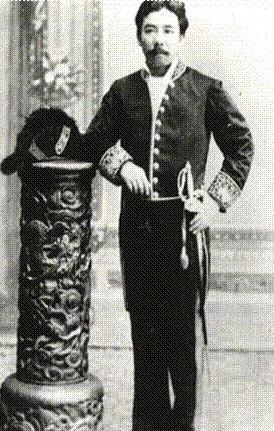
Miyaki Kōzō

==== Court uniforms of the Iwakura Mission ====
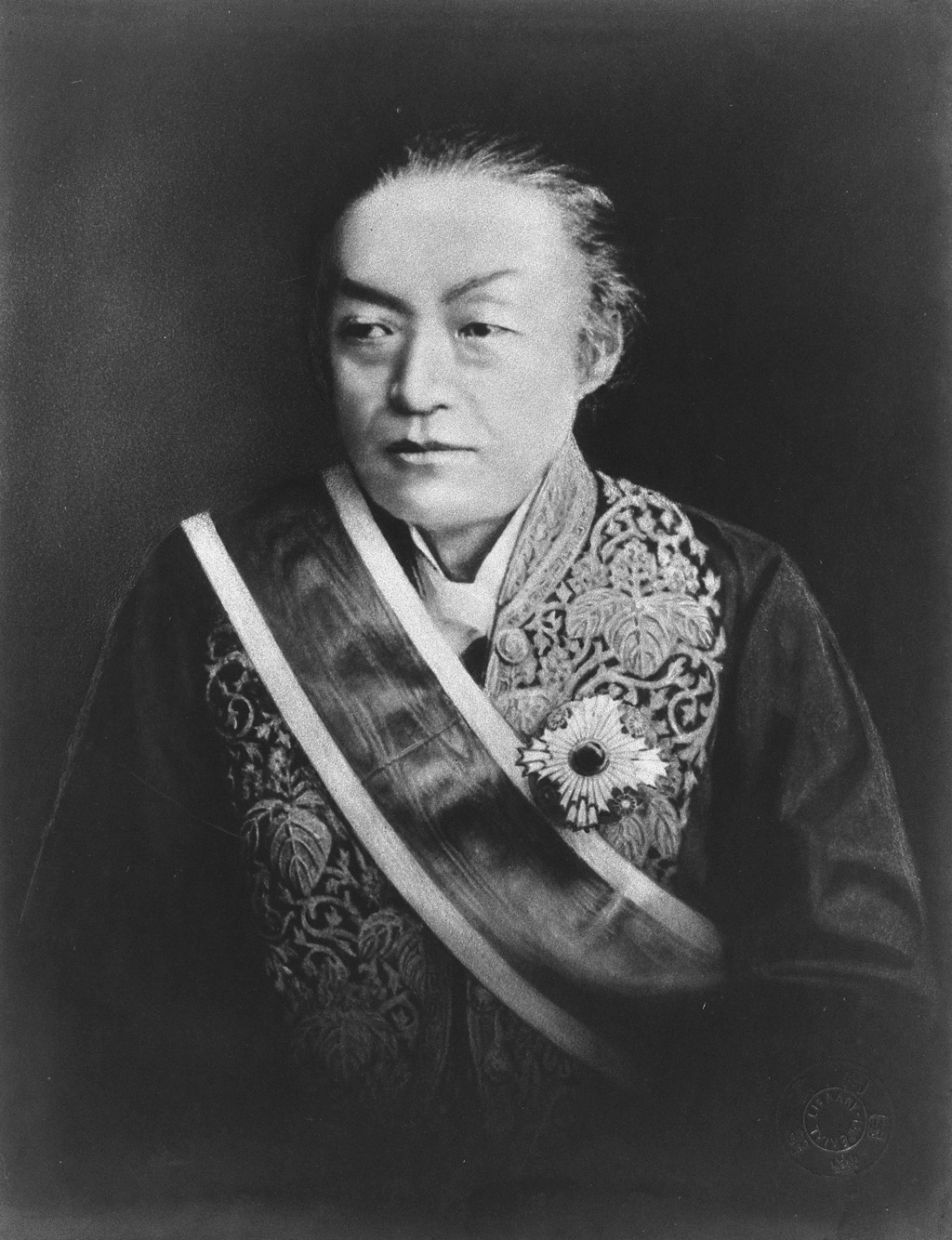
Iwakura Tomomi

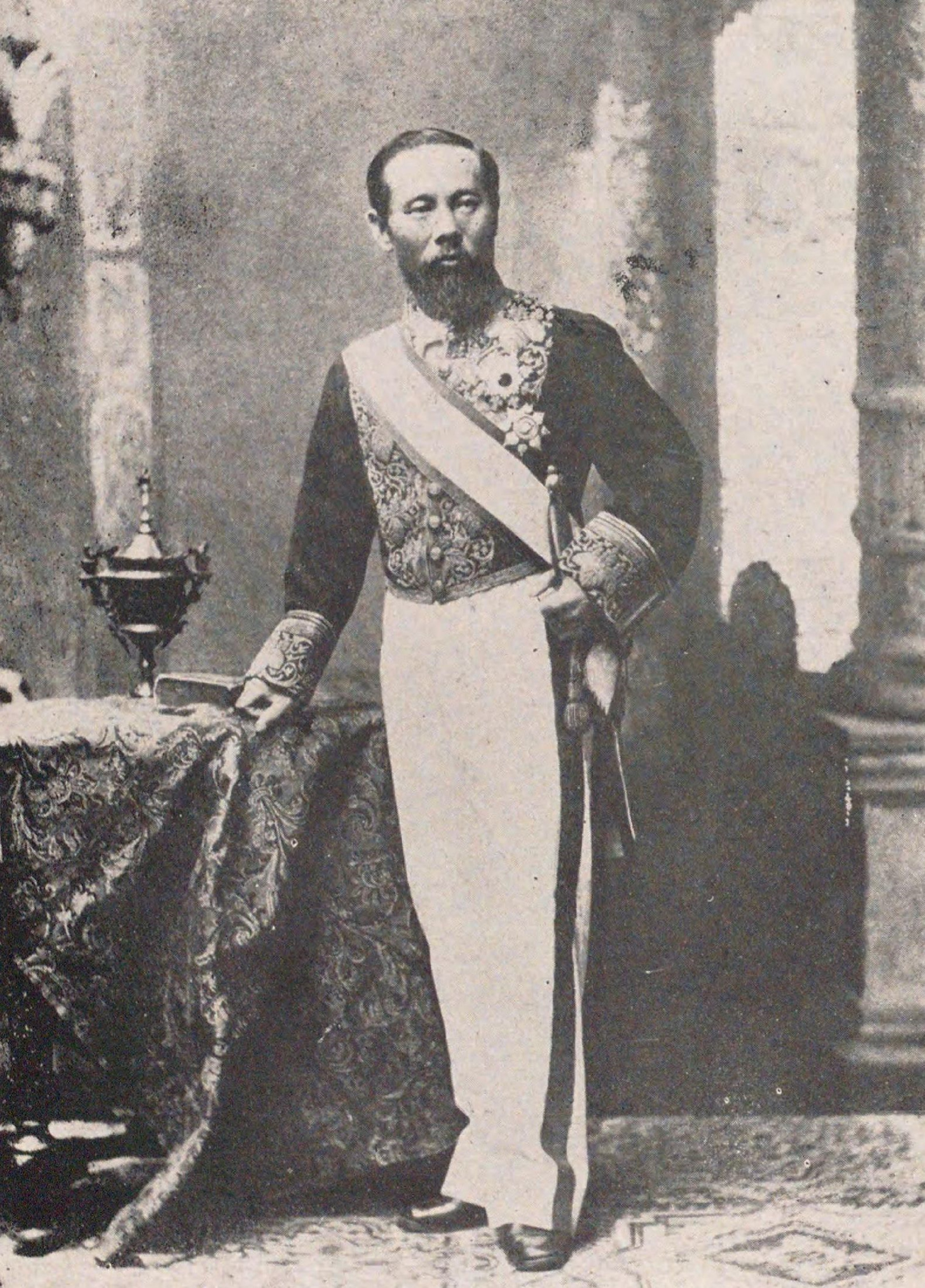
Itō Hirobumi

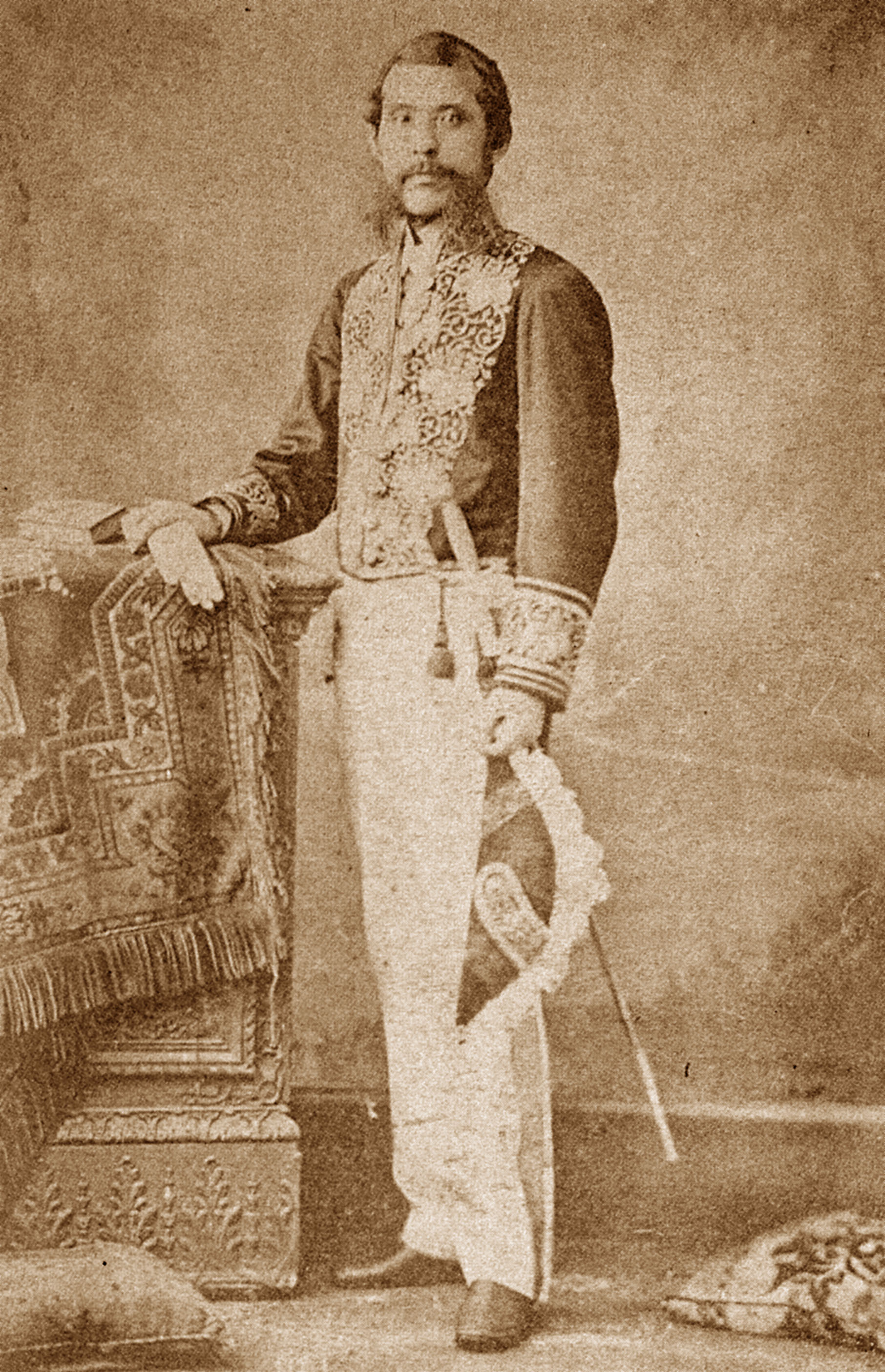
Ōkubo Toshimichi

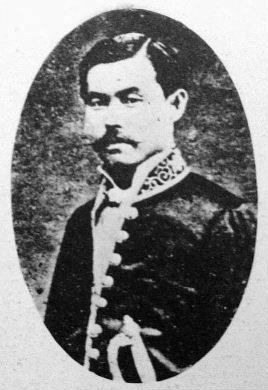
Fukuchi Gen'ichirō

==== Composition ====
Hat
Chokuninkan, sōninkan, and hanninkan wore the same kind of hats, but had different embellishments to the decoration on the right side.
Coat
A frock coat of black wool. The various ornamented areas were decorated based on rank: chokuninkan used 5-7-5 leaf paulownia flowers, surrounded by densely embroidered paulownia buds. Sōninkan used 3-5-3 leaf paulownias with more sparsely embroidered paulownia buds. Hanninkan use the same decorations as sōninkan, but the paulownia buds are sparser yet.
Vest
A wool vest; white for chokuninkan, dark gray for sōninkan, and navy blue for hanninkan. After the September 18, 1877, edict of the Dajō-kan, black was also allowed for chokuninkan and sōninkan.
Trousers
Wool trousers; white for chokuninkan, dark gray for sōninkan, and navy blue for hanninkan. After the September 18, 1877, edict of the Dajō-kan, black was also allowed for chokuninkan and sōninkan.

===== Ornamentation =====
Ornamented areas
Chokuninkan had ornamentation at the collar, back, chest, sleeves, sides, and small of the back. Sōninkan had decorations only at the collar, sleeves, sides, and small of the back. Hanninkan had decorations only at the collar and sleeves. Chokuninkan used embroidery in spiraling patterns resembling lightning (雷紋, raimon) at the rim of the ornamentation and the fringe of the coat. Sōninkan and hanninkan used plain solid lines in these areas.
Rank indication
Embroidered in the ornamented areas of both sleeves. Each line was one bu (about 3 millimetres (0.12 in)) across, and the space between lines was eight rin (about 2.4 millimetres (0.094 in)). The lowest rank within each of the chokuninkan, sōninkan, and hanninkan classes wore one line and a line was added for each additional rank.
Buttons
Chokuninkan wore gold-coated buttons inlaid with a 5-7-5 leaf paulownia flower, sōninkan gold-coated buttons with a 3-5-3 leaf paulownia, and hanninkan silver-coated buttons with a 3-5-3 leaf paulownia. Those used on the coat rather than the hat decoration also had a raised rim about three rin (0.9 millimetres (0.035 in)) across.

==== Uniforms for lower officials ====
Civil officials below the hanninkan level used standard white-tie court dress. However, the higher-ranking among these affixed symbols of their ranks to each cuff.

=== After the 1886 revision ===
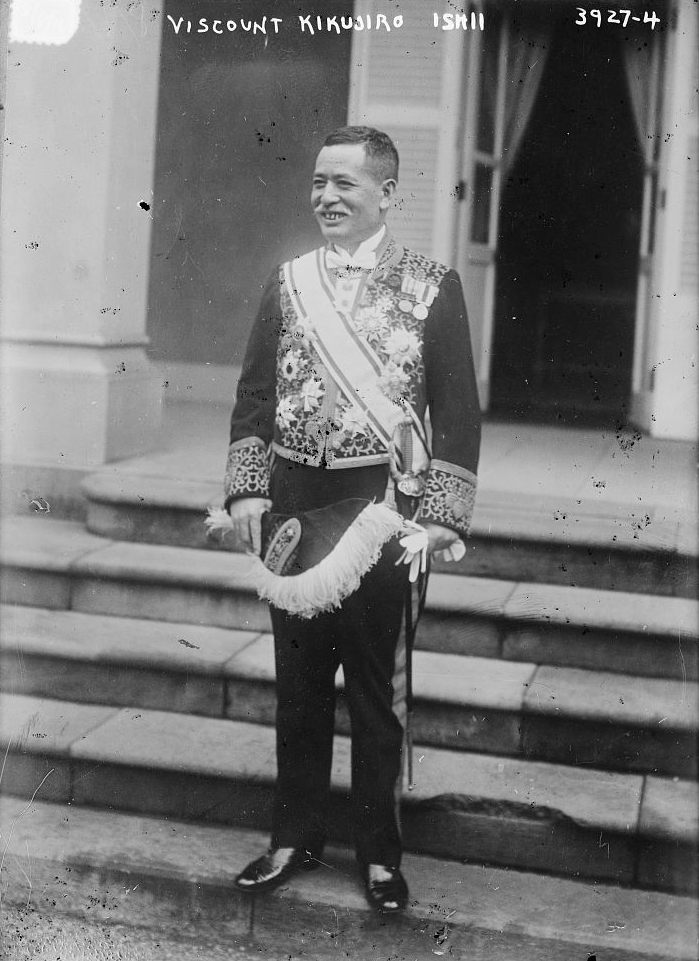
Ishii Kikujirō

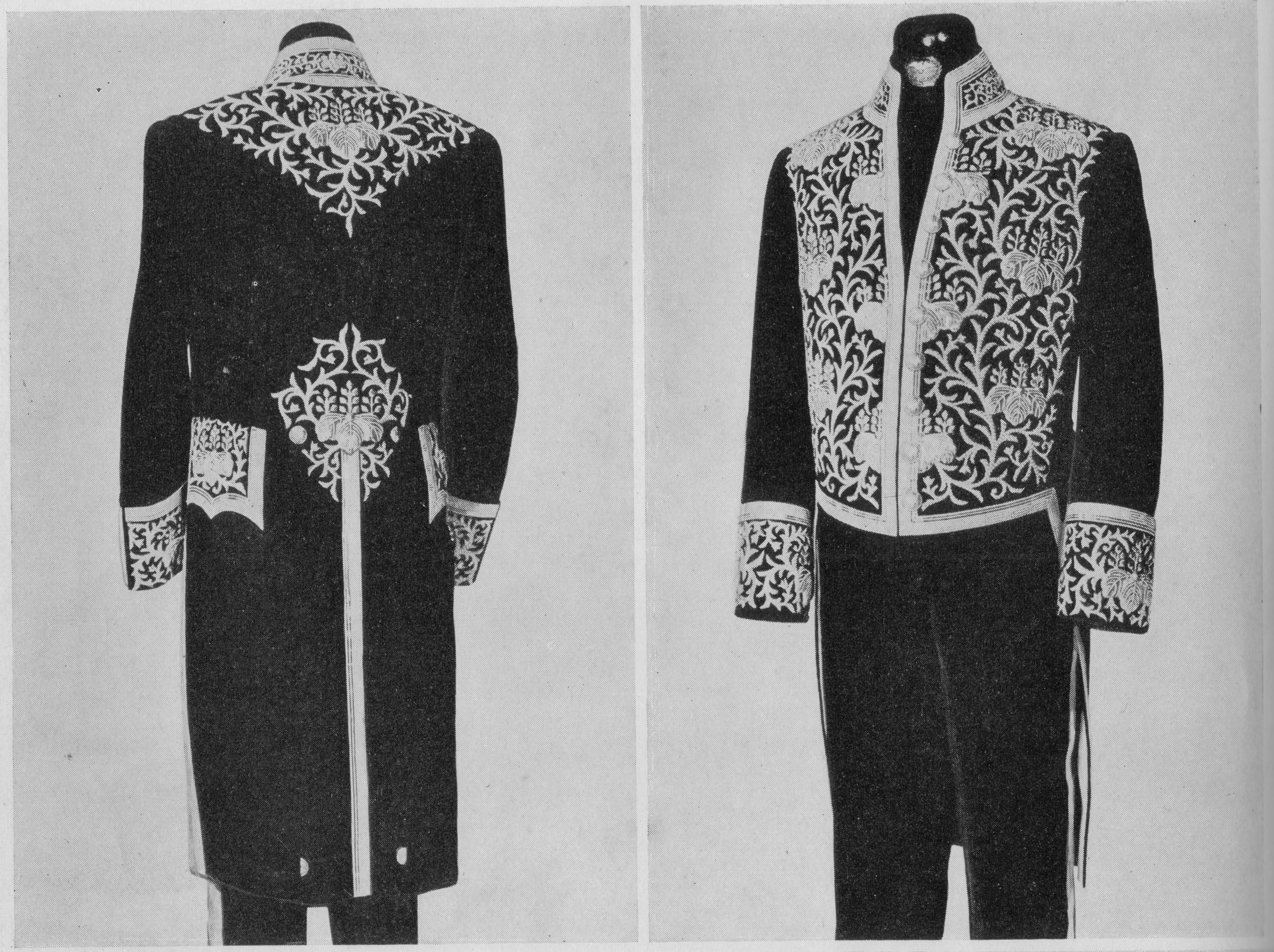
Chokuninkan, front and back

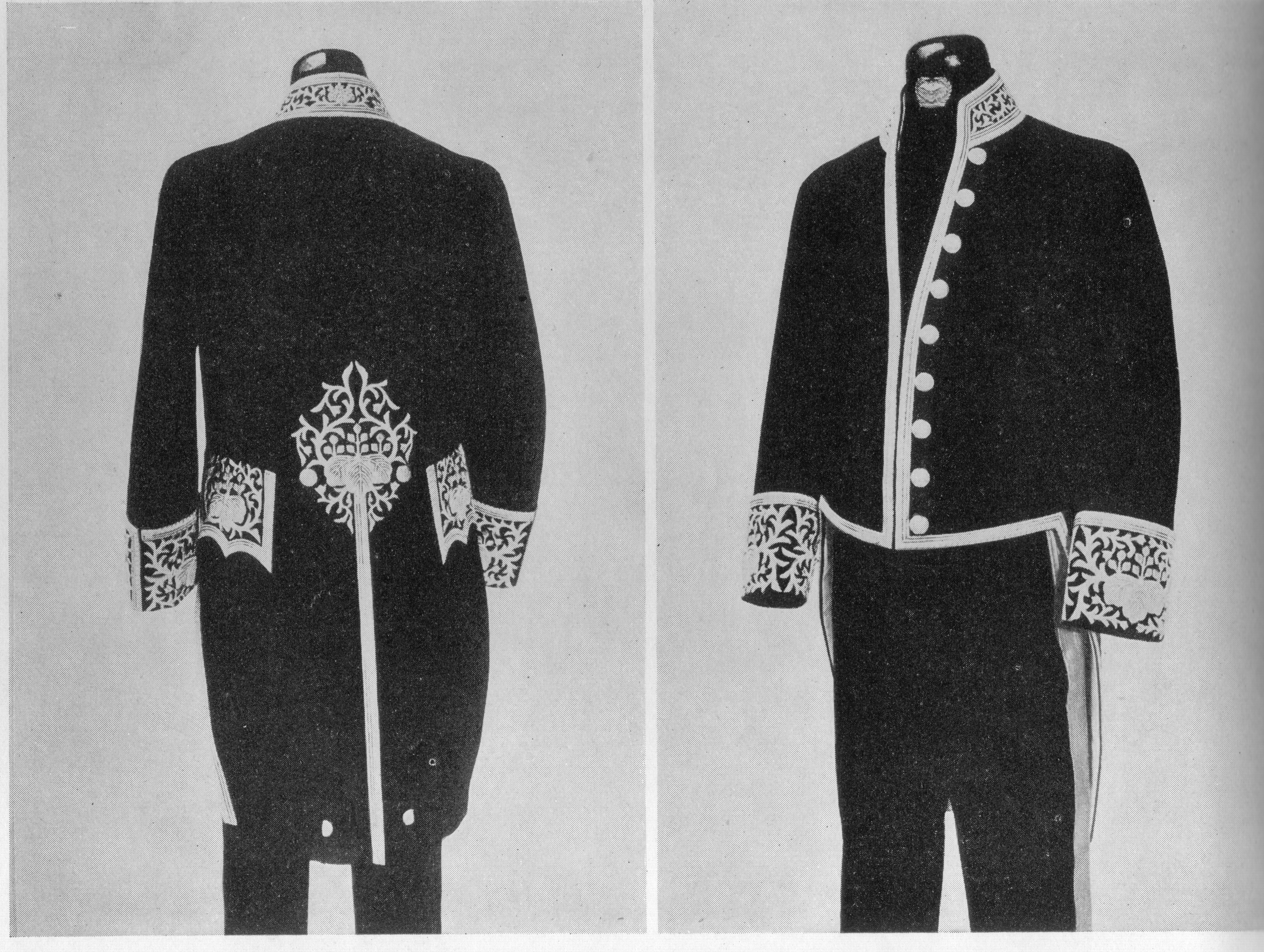
Sōninkan, front and back

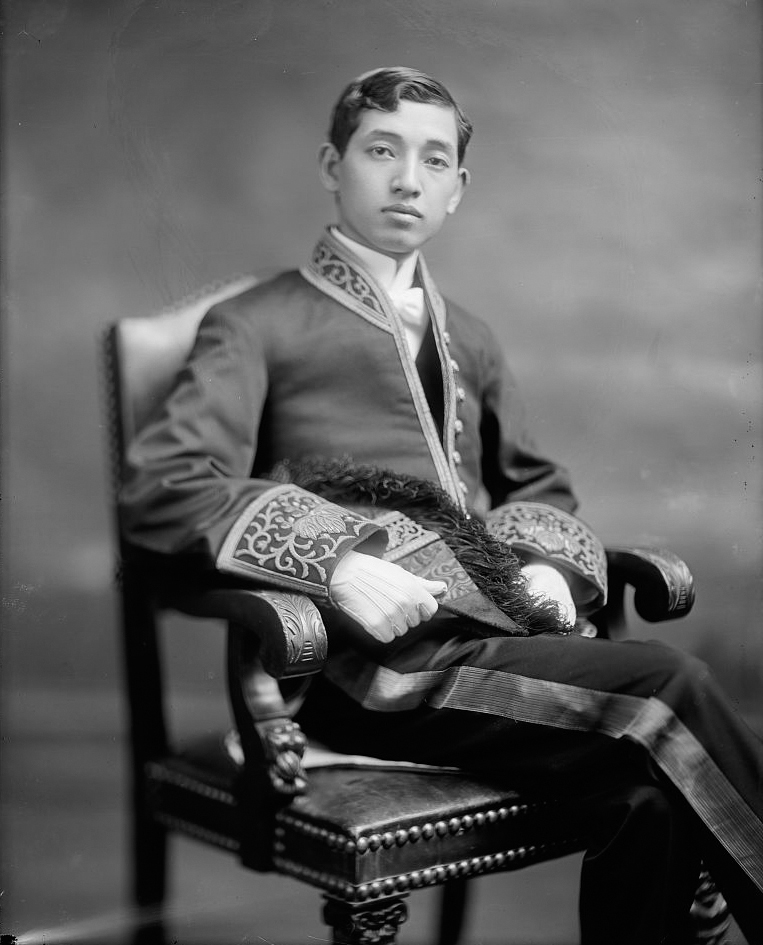
The ambassador Hiroshi Saitō as a sōninkan

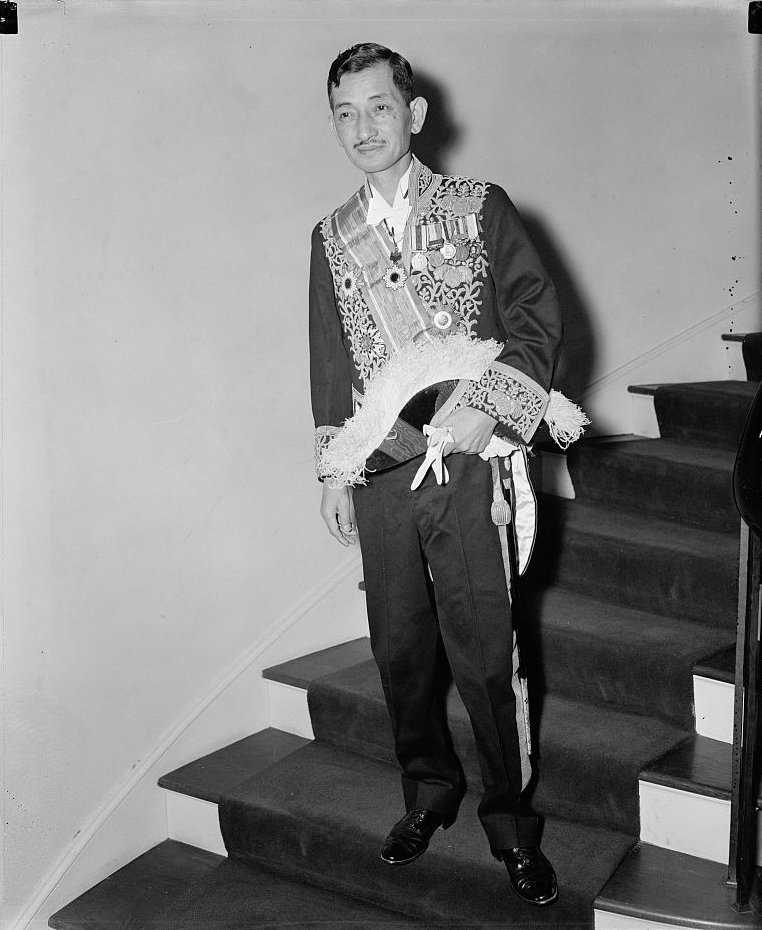
Hiroshi Saitō as a chokuninkan

== Court uniforms for court ranks ==
Court rank uniforms (fourth rank and above)

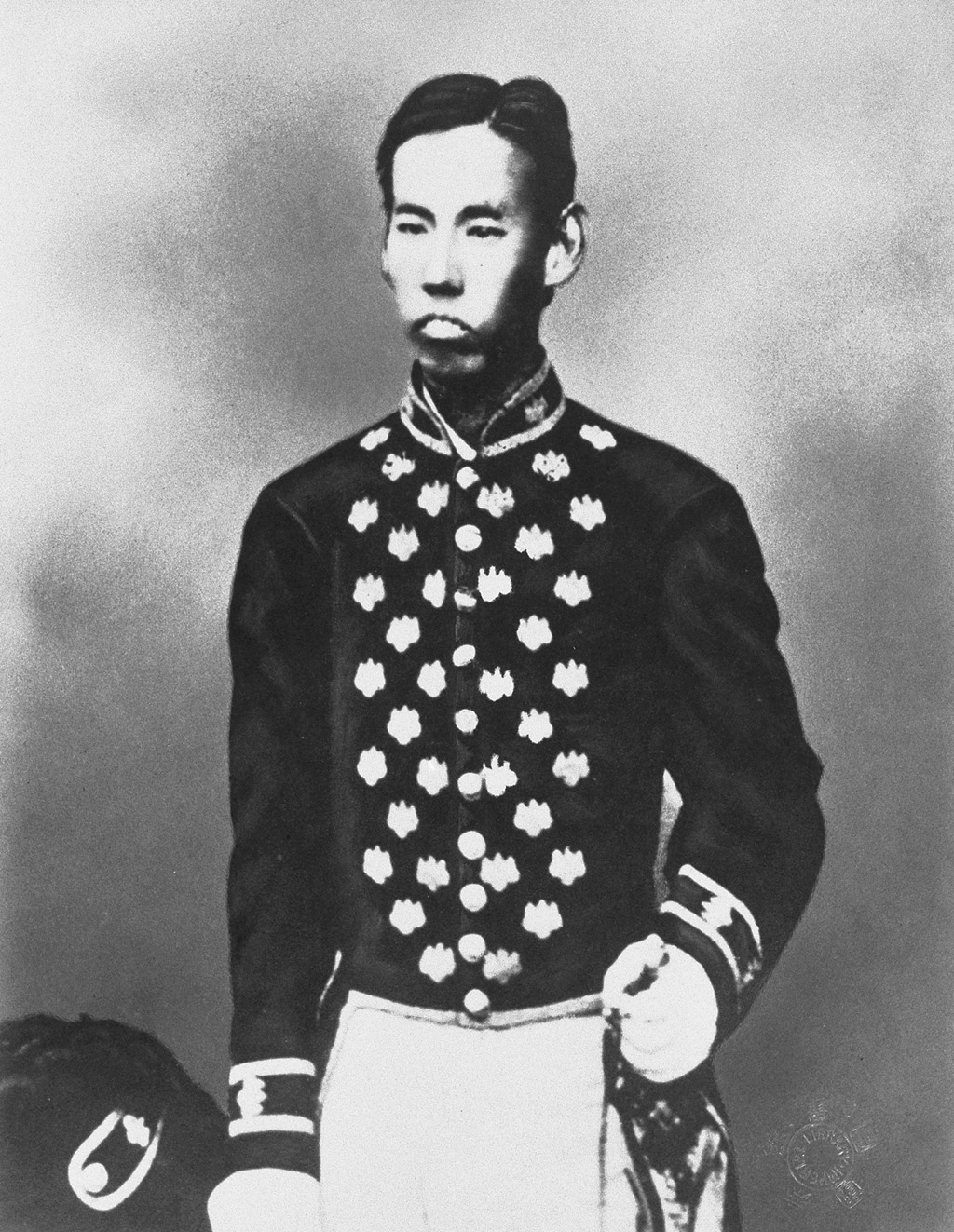
Mōri Motonori, dressed to the 1872 standard

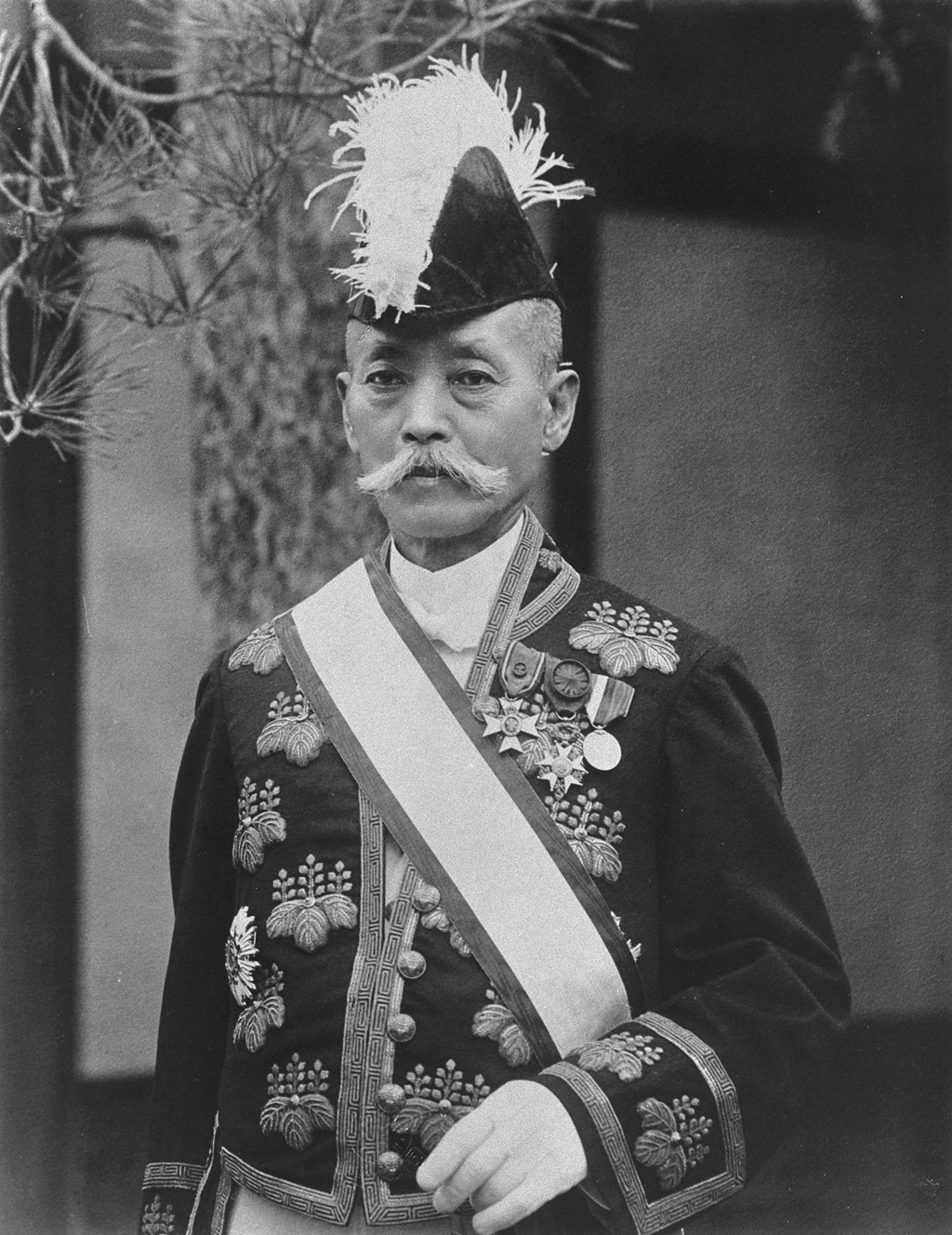
Yukio Ozaki, dressed to the 1886 standard

The court uniforms for people possessing court ranks, but no official position, were decided along with those for civil officials in the December 12, 1872, edict of the Dajō-kan. After the establishment of the five ranks (duke, baron, etc.) within the kazoku peerage, however, heads of titled households wore uniforms specific to their titles. According to the Regulations for Investiture (叙位条例, joi jōrei) of May 4, 1887, people possessing the junior fourth rank (従四位) or above were entitled to treatment comparable to that of titled peers. Specifically, the junior first rank was to correspond to the title of duke, the senior second rank to a marquis, the junior second rank to a count, the senior third rank to a viscount, and the senior fourth rank to a baron.

The uniforms for ranks above the fourth conformed to those of chokuninkan, and those for the senior fifth rank and above to those of sōninkan. However, they were decorated only with mon (emblems), with no additional foliage scrollwork embroidery, and with one mon emblem, two sun (about 6 centimetres (2.4 in)) in diameter, affixed at the small of the back. In the 1872 version, the hat plumage was black even for those above the fourth rank, and the stripes on the trousers were composed of embroidered lines of five bu (about 15 millimetres (0.59 in)) across in a raimon pattern, while people of the fifth rank and below had single stripes of the same width. An edict of the Dajō-kan on October 8, 1877, added black wool trousers, and a May 27, 1911, Imperial Household ordinance changed the hat plumage for those of fourth rank or above to white.

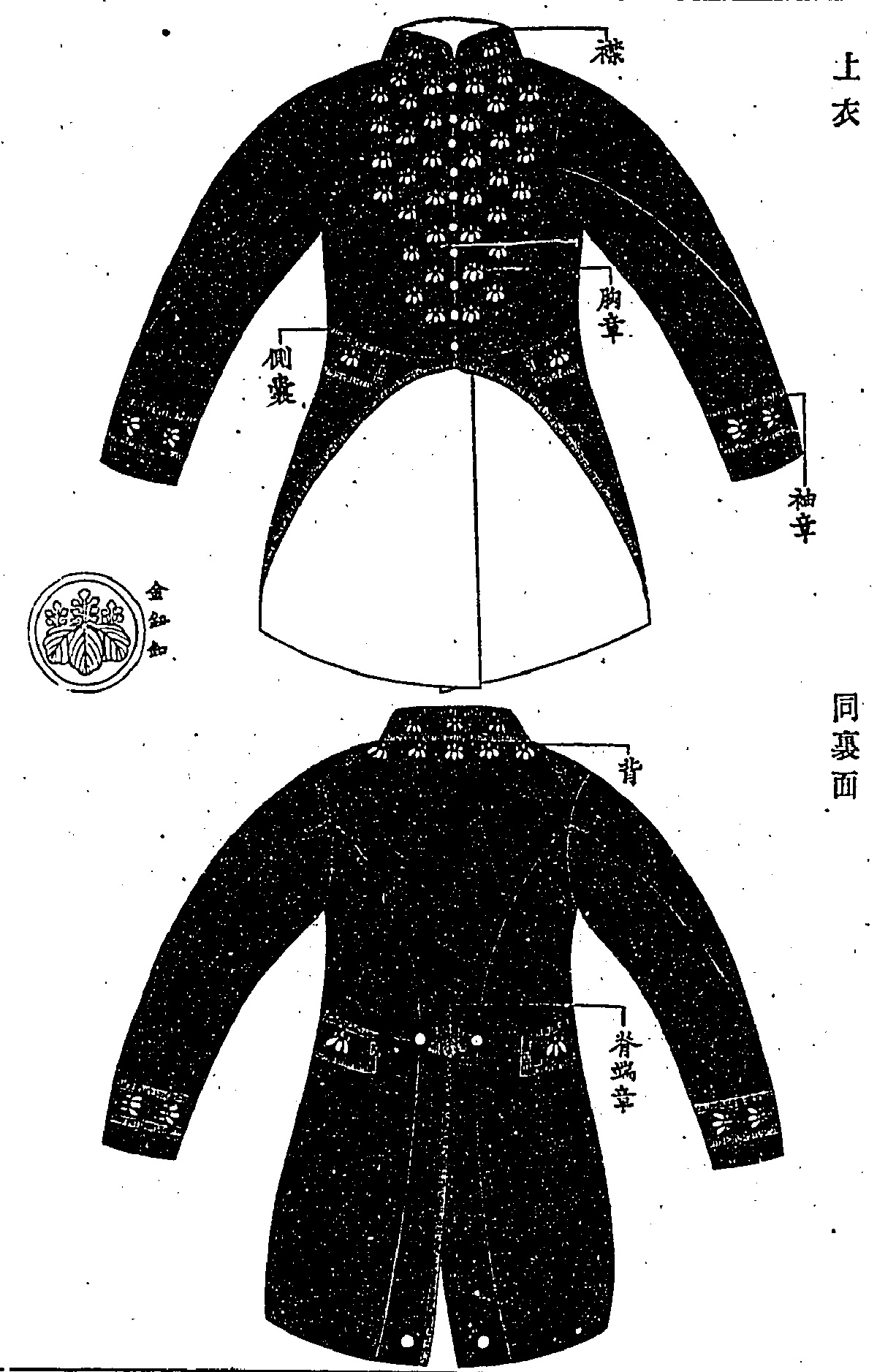
Accompanying diagram to the 1872 court uniforms for the fourth rank and above

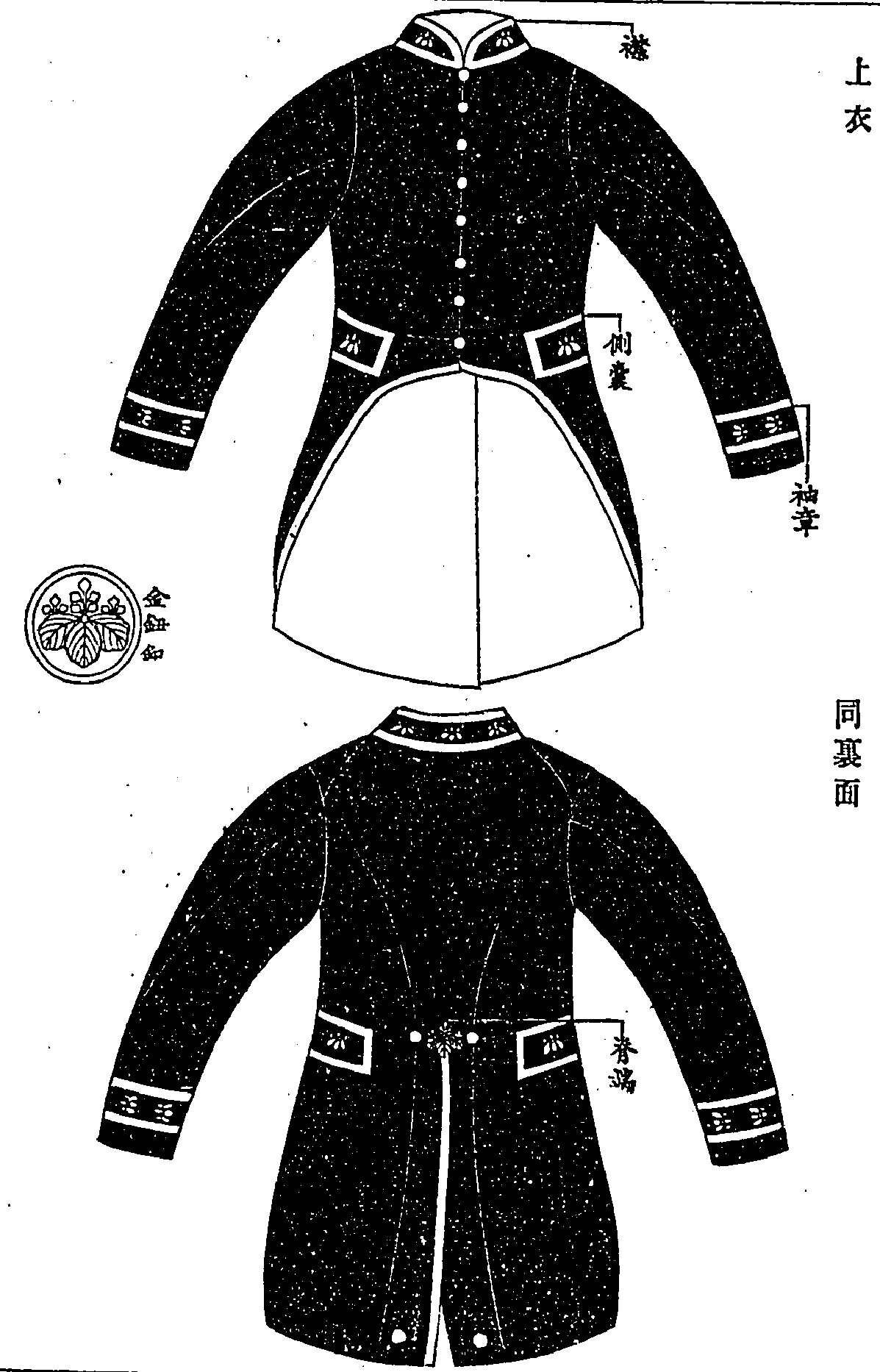
Accompanying diagram to the 1872 court uniforms for the fifth rank and below

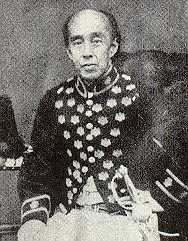
Makino Tadayuki

== The Emperor's Western clothes ==
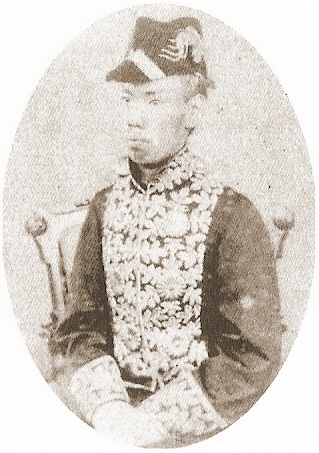
Emperor Meiji in clothes based on a civil official's court uniform

The continuing Westernization of the Emperor's clothing, food, and living conditions after the Meiji Restoration led to the need for Western gofuku (御服), or Imperial garb. This was prepared in 1872, and resembled the court uniforms for civil officials. At the time, the Emperor still had a topknot, and so his hat was designed to contain it.

However, the foreign government advisor Albert du Bousquet advised that the emperor of France wore a military general's uniform, rather than that of a civil official. Shortly thereafter, (Note: Nishikoori claims the new gofuku was used from the Emperor's Birthday in 1872; Osakabe claims their use began in June of the next year.) new military-style gofuku, called gogunpuku (御軍服) or gotaireifuku (御大禮服), were created. These gogunpuku were used until October 11, 1880, when another edict of the Dajō-kan created a new uniform called the rikugun-shiki gofuku (陸軍式御服), based on the uniform of a general in the Japanese army. The 1880 edict was replaced on November 14, 1913, by an Imperial Household ordinance. Along with a redesign of the army uniform-based outfit, a version based on naval uniform was also introduced. After this, the army- and navy-style uniforms were redefined and the corresponding ordinance modified whenever the base army and navy uniforms were themselves updated.

When Japan lost the Second World War and the Imperial Japanese Army was dissolved in 1945, a new Imperial uniform was established. However, this new uniform was abolished on May 2, 1947, along with all other Imperial Household Edicts.

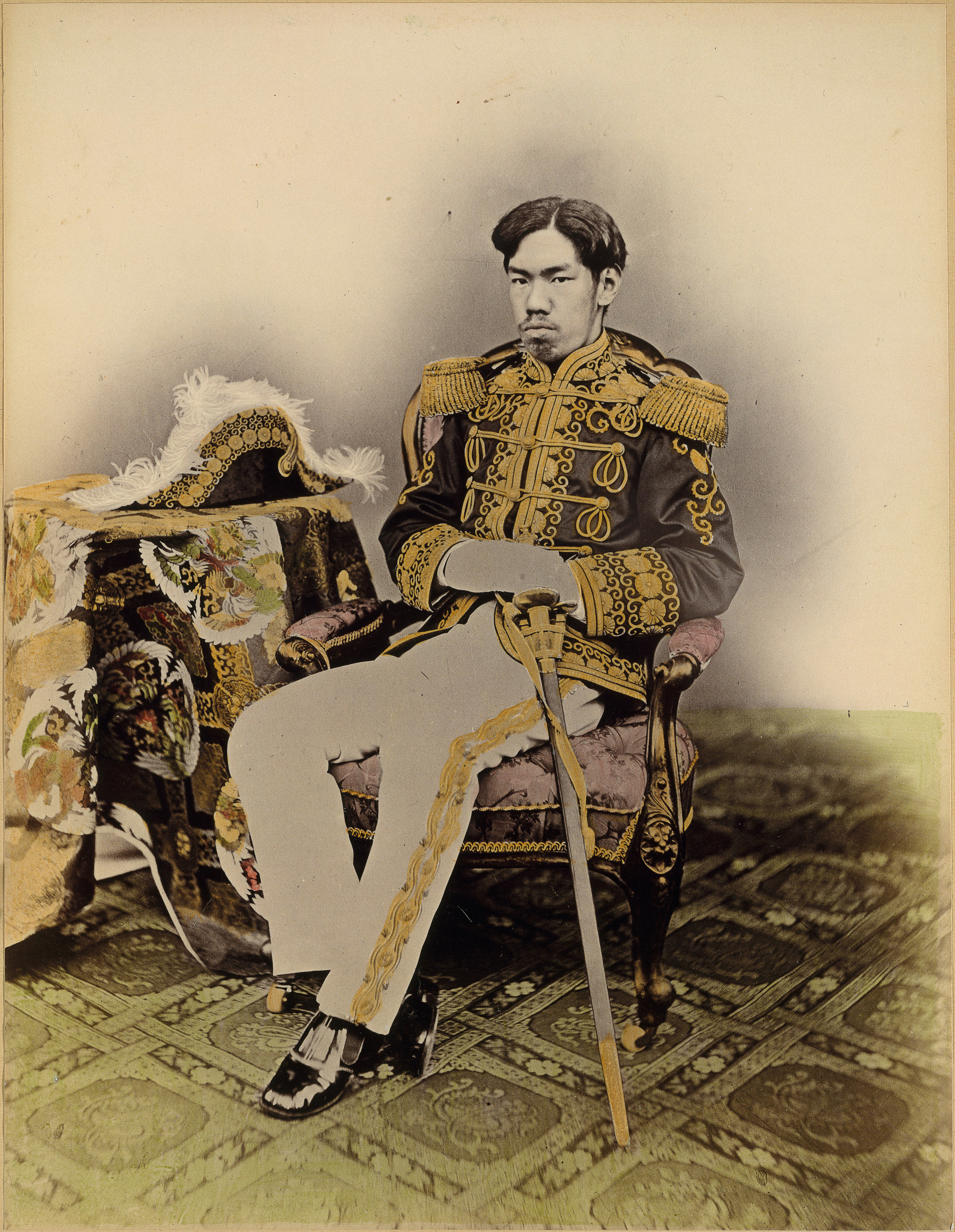
Emperor Meiji in army-style gotaireifuku

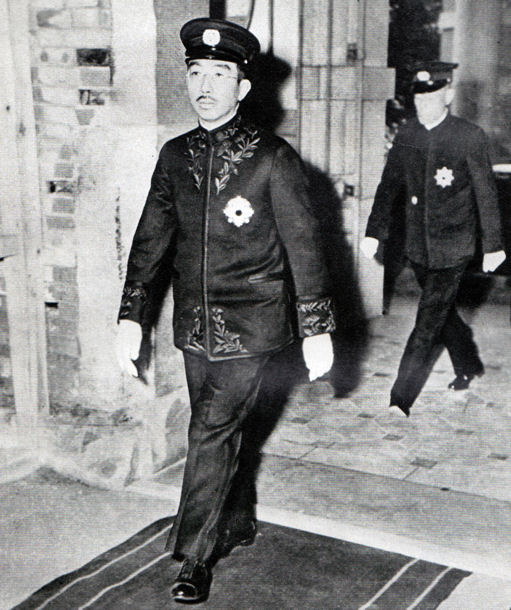
Emperor Shōwa in the 1945 Imperial uniform design

== Court uniforms for the Imperial Family ==
When the court uniforms for the Imperial Family were first established on February 22, 1873, the designs were more or less the same as those for court ranks, but with the paulownia crests replaced with the chrysanthemum seal. This made the Imperial Family's uniforms difficult to distinguish from those for court ranks, and so on October 12, 1876, they were updated with chrysanthemum foliage scrollwork.

In 1911, the Imperial Household Ordinance on Imperial Family Dress was promulgated, and an additional clause in it abolished the pertinent Dajō-kan edicts of 1873 and 1876. This order defined two levels of formal dress, changed the chrysanthemum foliage scrollwork to use a sakura motif instead, and specified fully closed mandarin collars. However, as Imperial Family members were now supposed to wear the uniforms of their offices if they held any, and most princes were appointed as officers in the military or navy unless there was a reason not to, most wore military uniforms, and these new uniforms for the Imperial Family saw little actual use.

Court uniforms of the Imperial Family

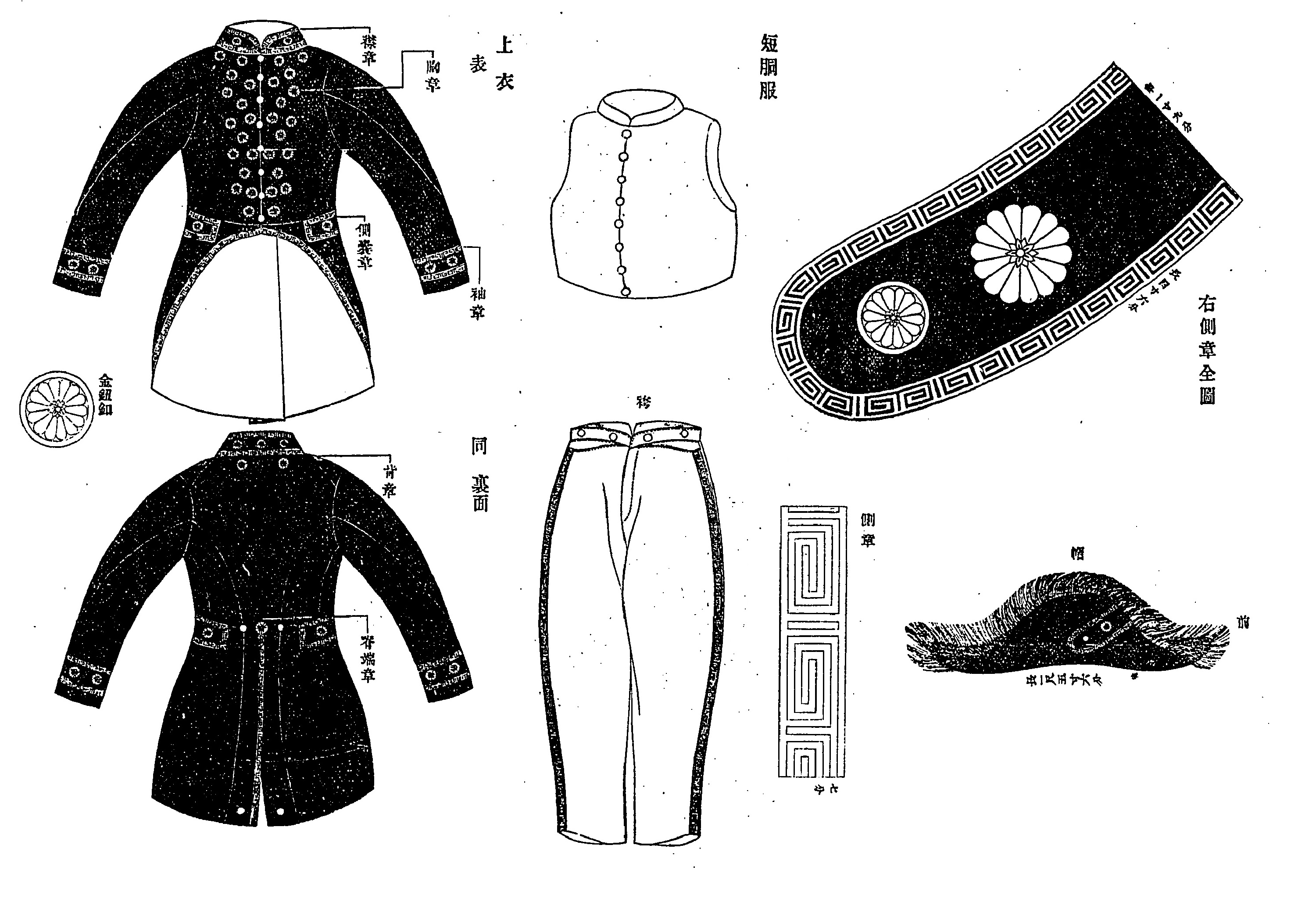
Diagram from the 1873 Dajō-kan edict

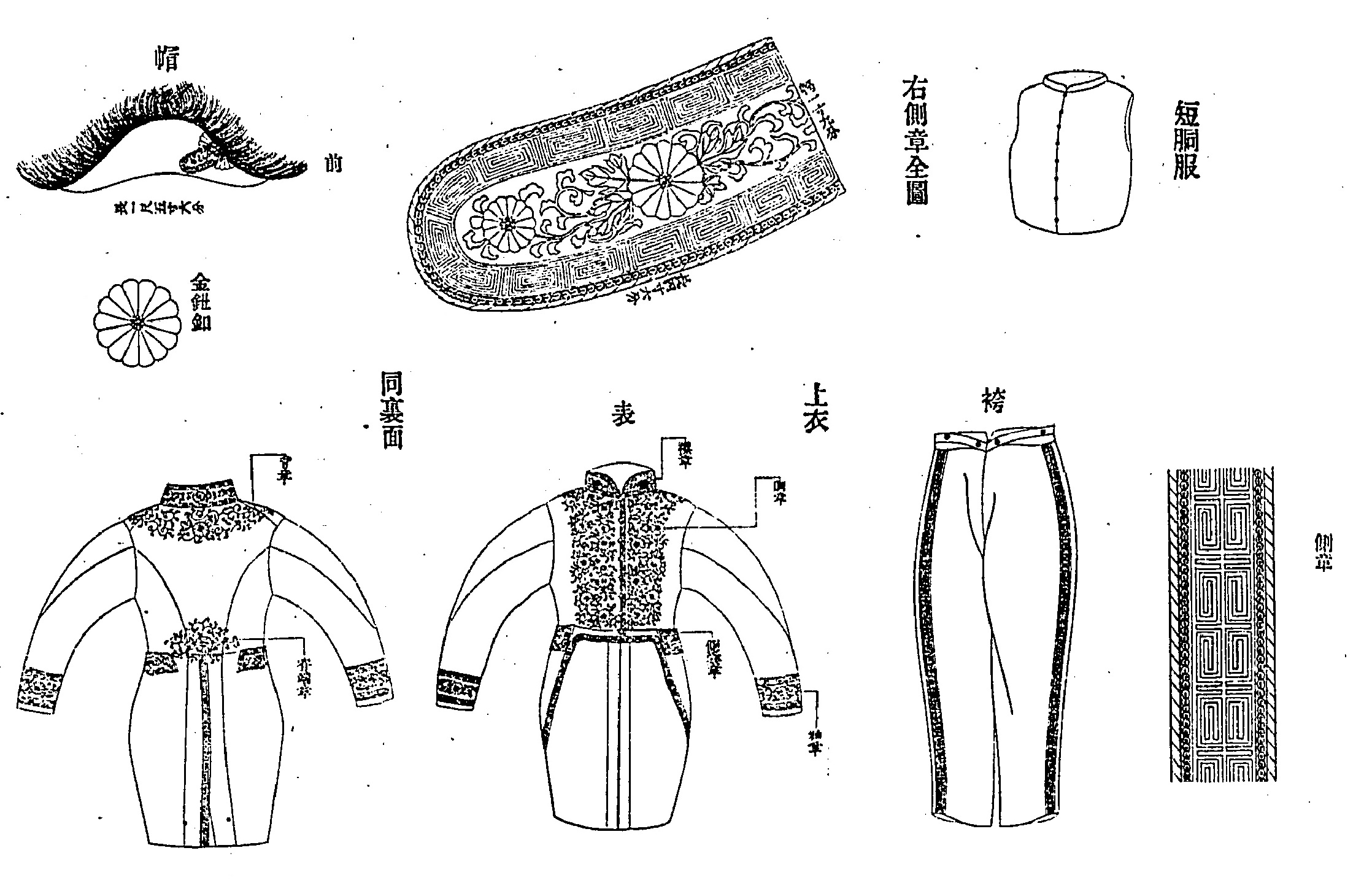
Diagram from the 1876 Dajō-kan edict

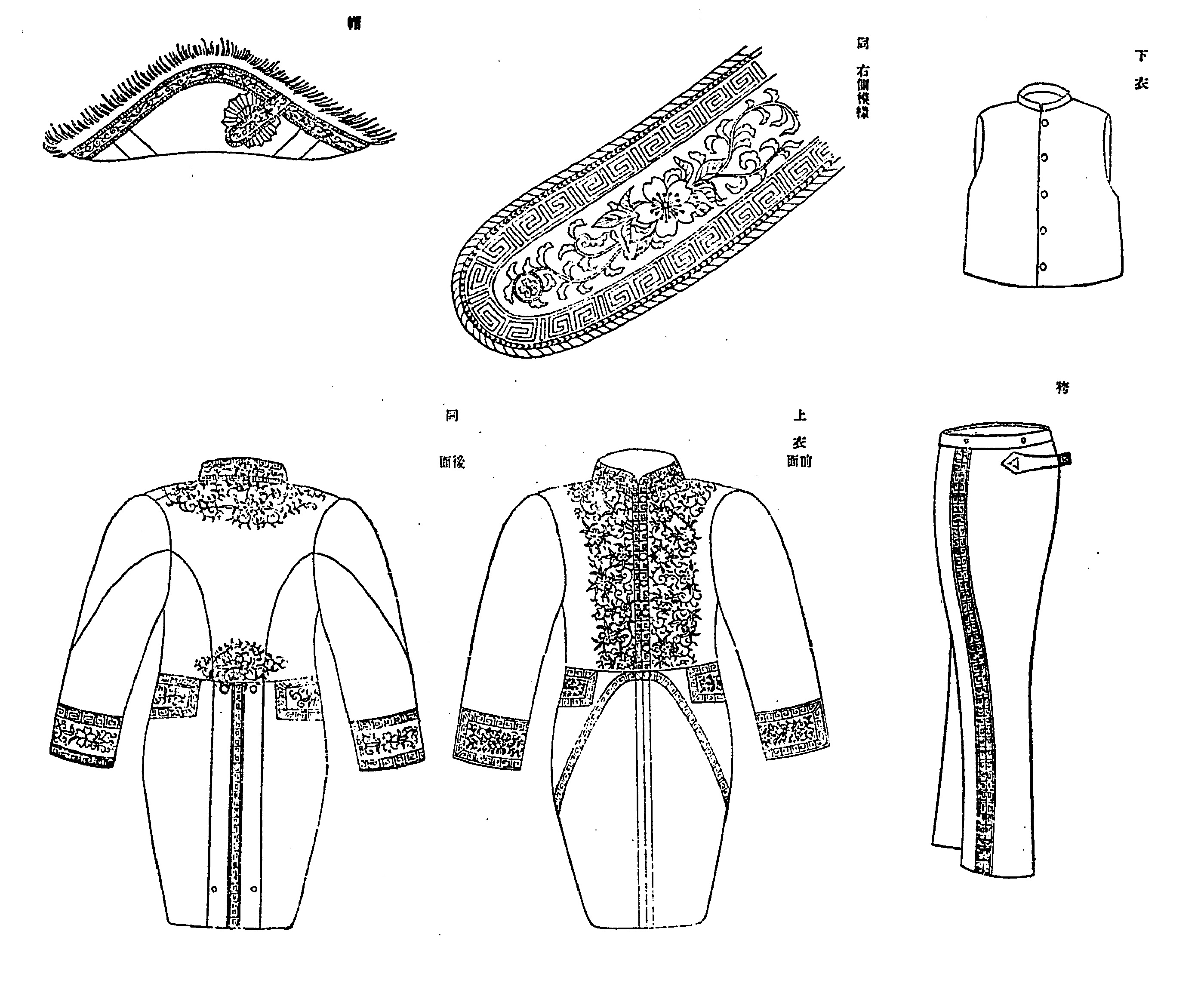
Diagram from the 1911 Imperial Household Agency edict

== Court uniforms for the kazoku ==
Kazoku court uniforms

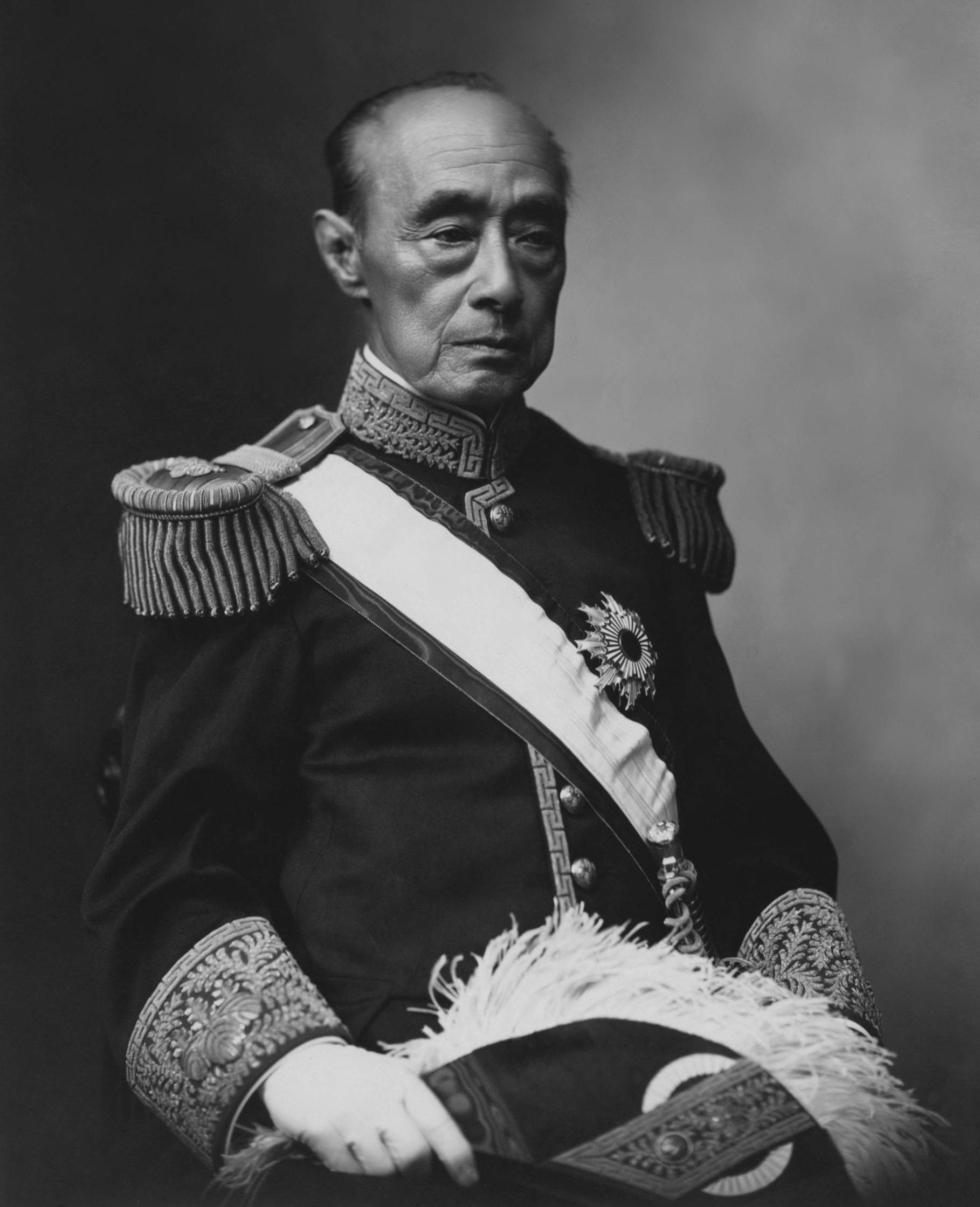
Duke Tokugawa Yoshinobu

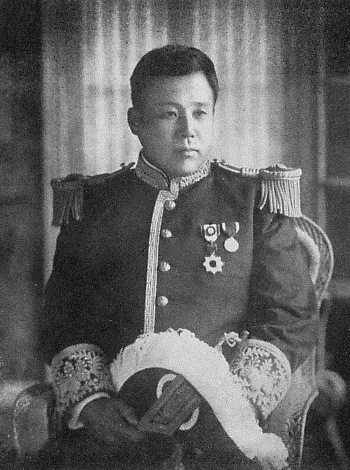
Marquis Saga Kintō

After the Peerage Act of July 7, 1884, divided the existing kazoku into five ranks, uniforms were established for these ranks by the Ministry of the Imperial Household on October 25 of the same year.

=== Composition ===
Compared to the uniforms for civil officials, those for kazoku lacked embroidery on the breast, but had a mandarin collar and epaulets.

Identifying the five ranks
The five ranks of kazoku were distinguishable by the color of the embroidery around their sleeves and collars, and on the right side of their hats. Dukes had purple, marquis scarlet, counts pink, viscounts pale yellow, and barons light green.
Hat
A black bicorne hat with white ostrich feather plumage.
Coat
A black tailcoat with a mandarin collar. Epaulets on the shoulders.
Vest
Either white wool or black wool. White wool was used on especially formal occasions.
Trousers
Either white wool or black wool. White wool was used on especially formal occasions. With one stripe on the side one sun (about 3 centimetres (1.2 in)) wide, in gold thread.
Buttons
5-7-5 leaf paulownia flower on gold background.
Sword
2 shaku, 3 sun, and 5 bu (about 71 centimetres (28 in)) long.

== Uniforms for palace officials ==
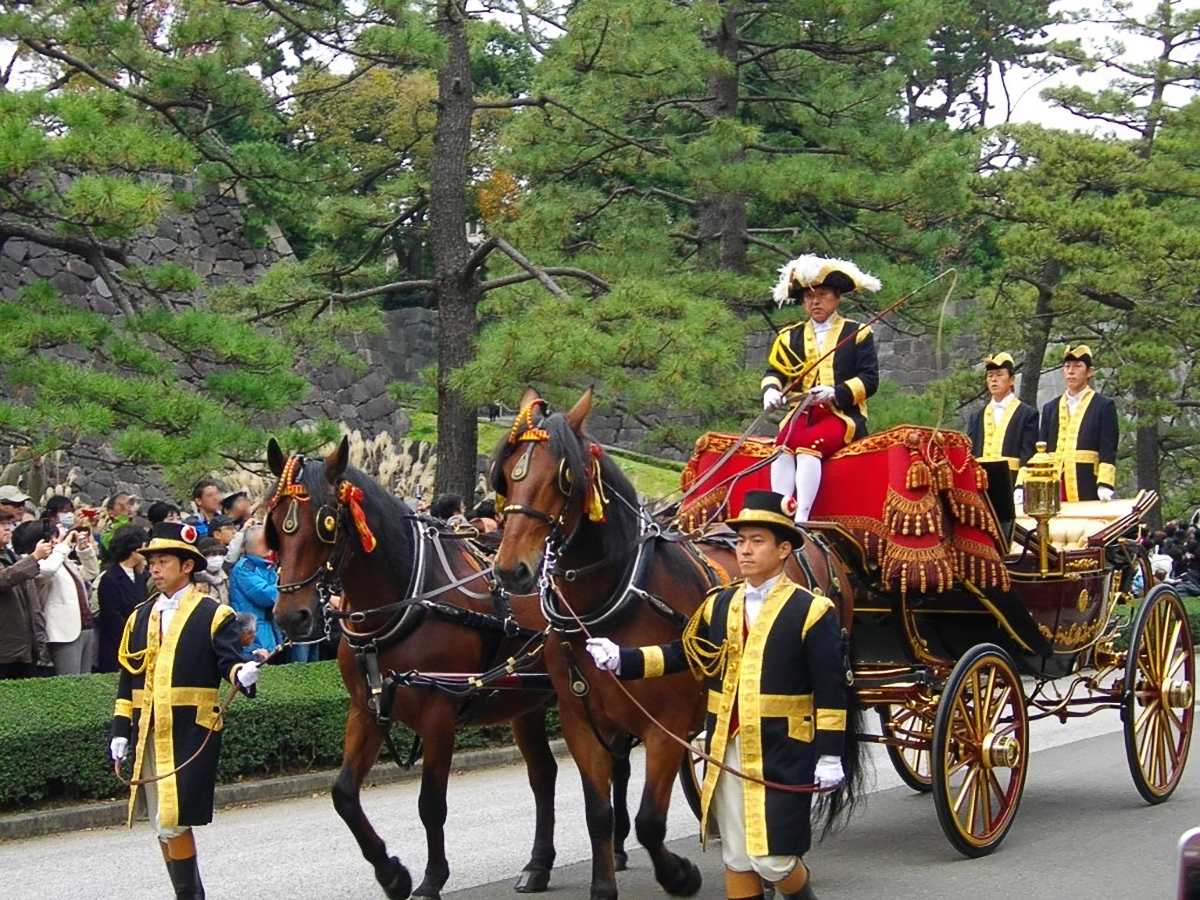
A coachman's court uniform, still in use by the Vehicles and Horses Division of the Imperial Household Agency

In 1884, court uniforms were decided for chokuninkan and sōninkan on the Board of the Chamberlains and the Board of Ceremonies. In 1886, the Imperial Guard were assigned both regular and court uniforms, and in 1888 the rest of the institutions of the Ministry of the Imperial Household were allocated their own. In 1889, chokuninkan and sōninkan of the Crown Prince's Household got both formal and informal court uniforms, and in 1891 escort dress was created for high officials in the Agency. These various regulations were unified in a 1911 revision, and major changes were made in 1928.

=== 1884 designs ===
The October 29, 1884, edict 91 of the Dajō-kan allocated court uniforms for chokuninkan and sōninkan on the Board of the Chamberlains and the Board of Ceremonies. These gown-like designs were based on Prussian court clothing, and were supposedly proposed by Yamagata Aritomo.

Diagrams from the October 29, 1884, Dajō-kan edict

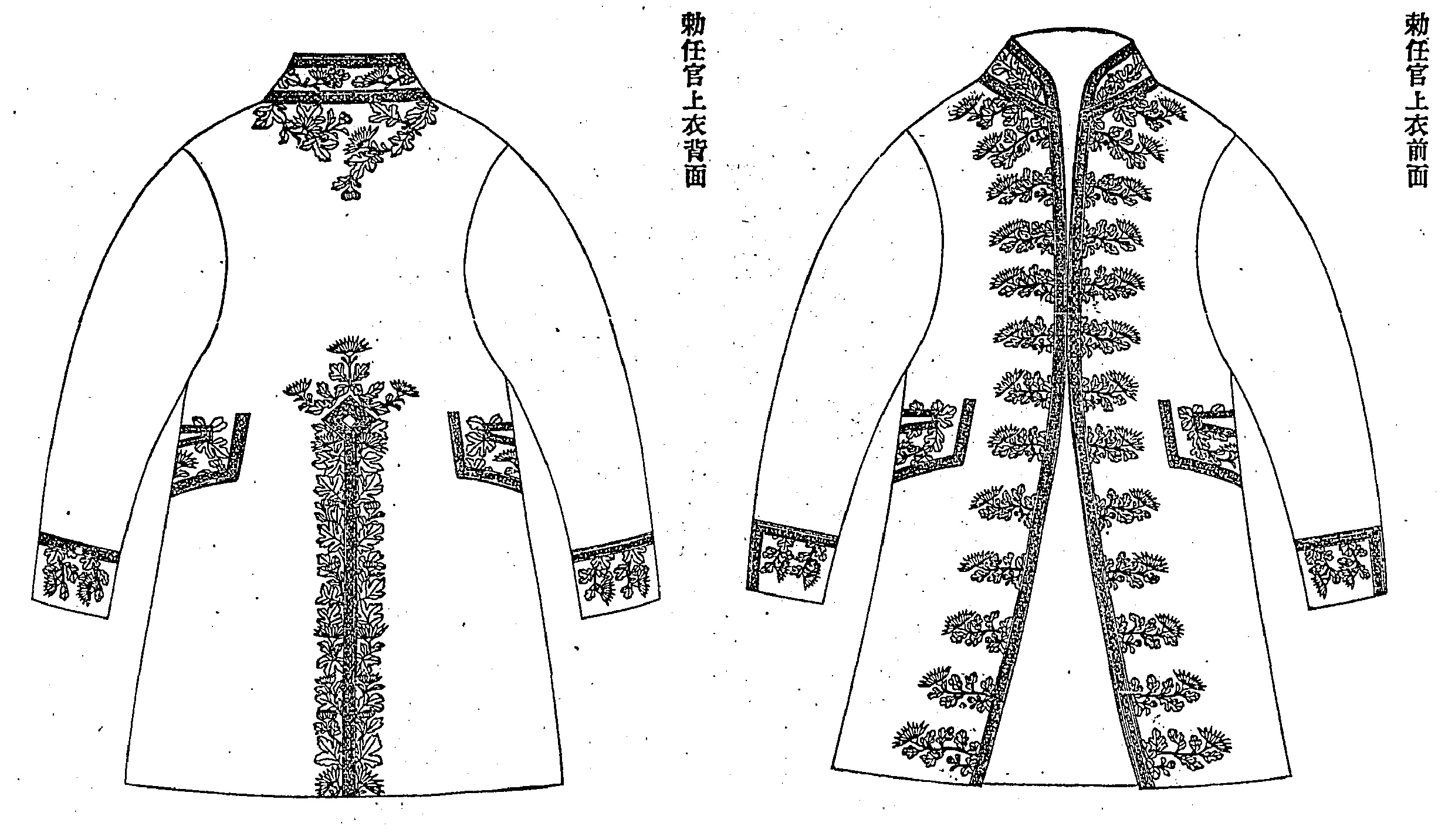
Chokuninkan

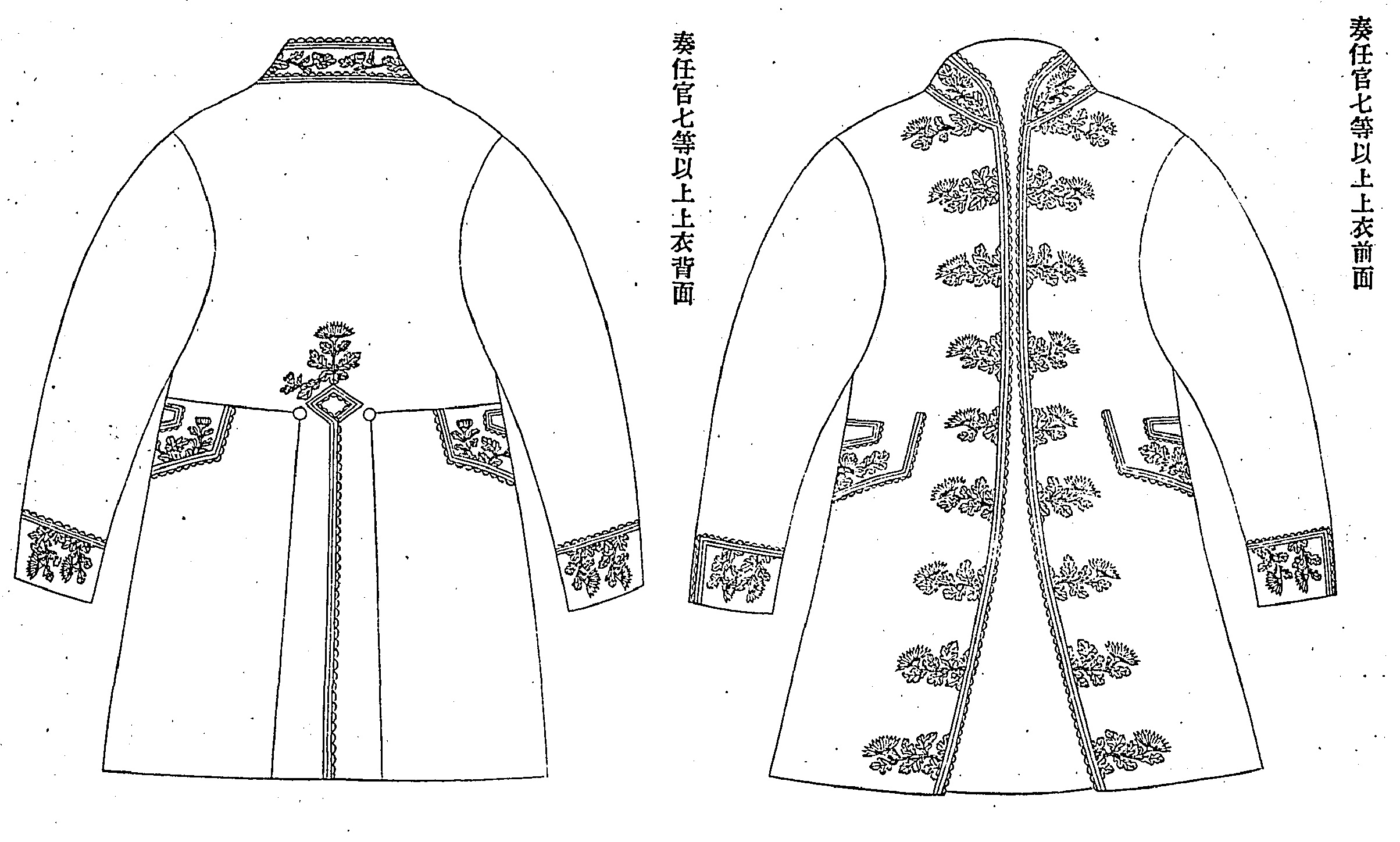
Sōninkan, seventh rank or higher

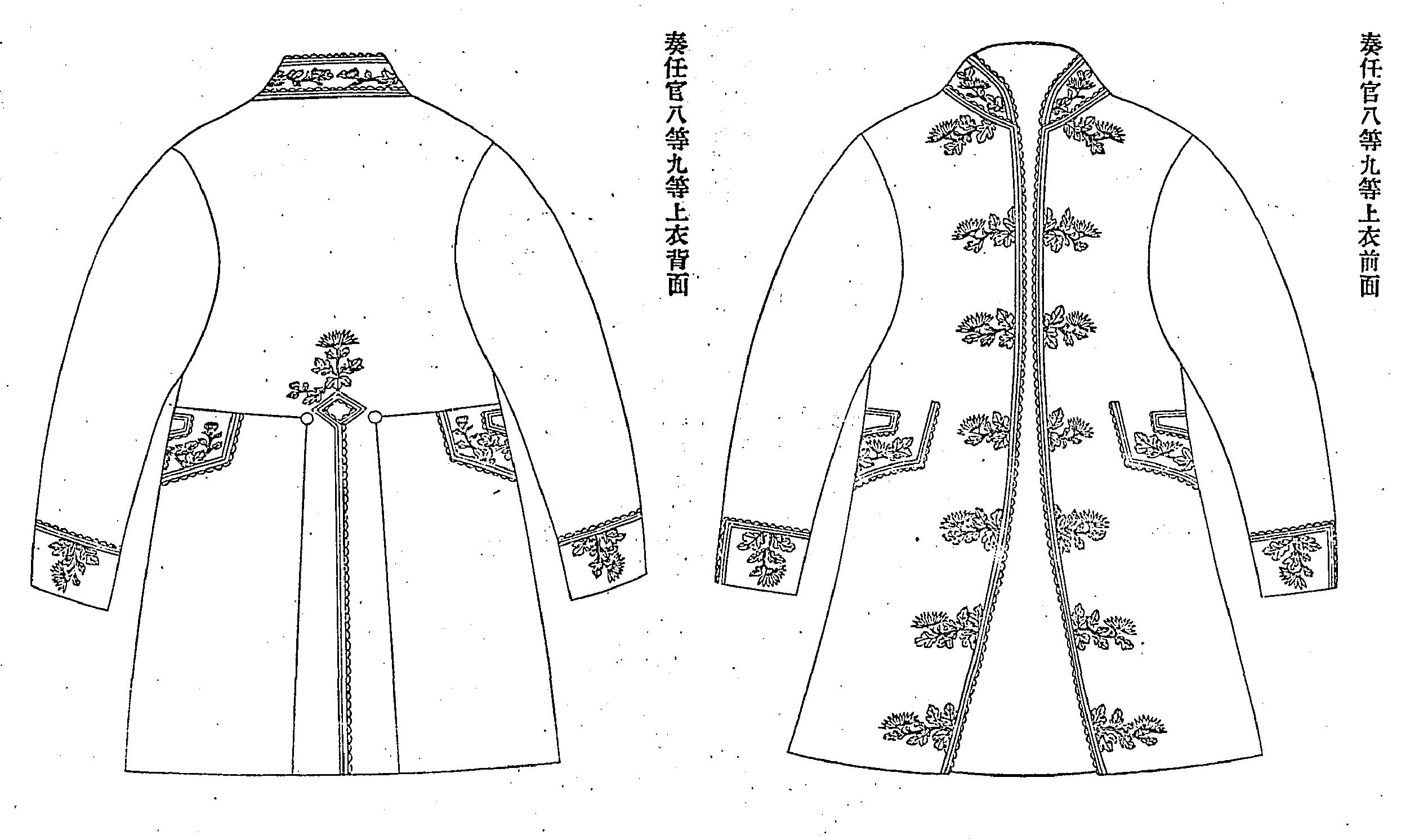
Sōninkan, eighth or ninth rank

=== 1886 designs ===
The June 26, 1886, edict 9 of the Ministry of the Imperial Household established regular and court uniforms for the Imperial Guard. These uniforms were based on those of officers in the British Army.

Diagrams for Imperial Guard uniforms from the June 26, 1886, Ministry of the Imperial Household edict

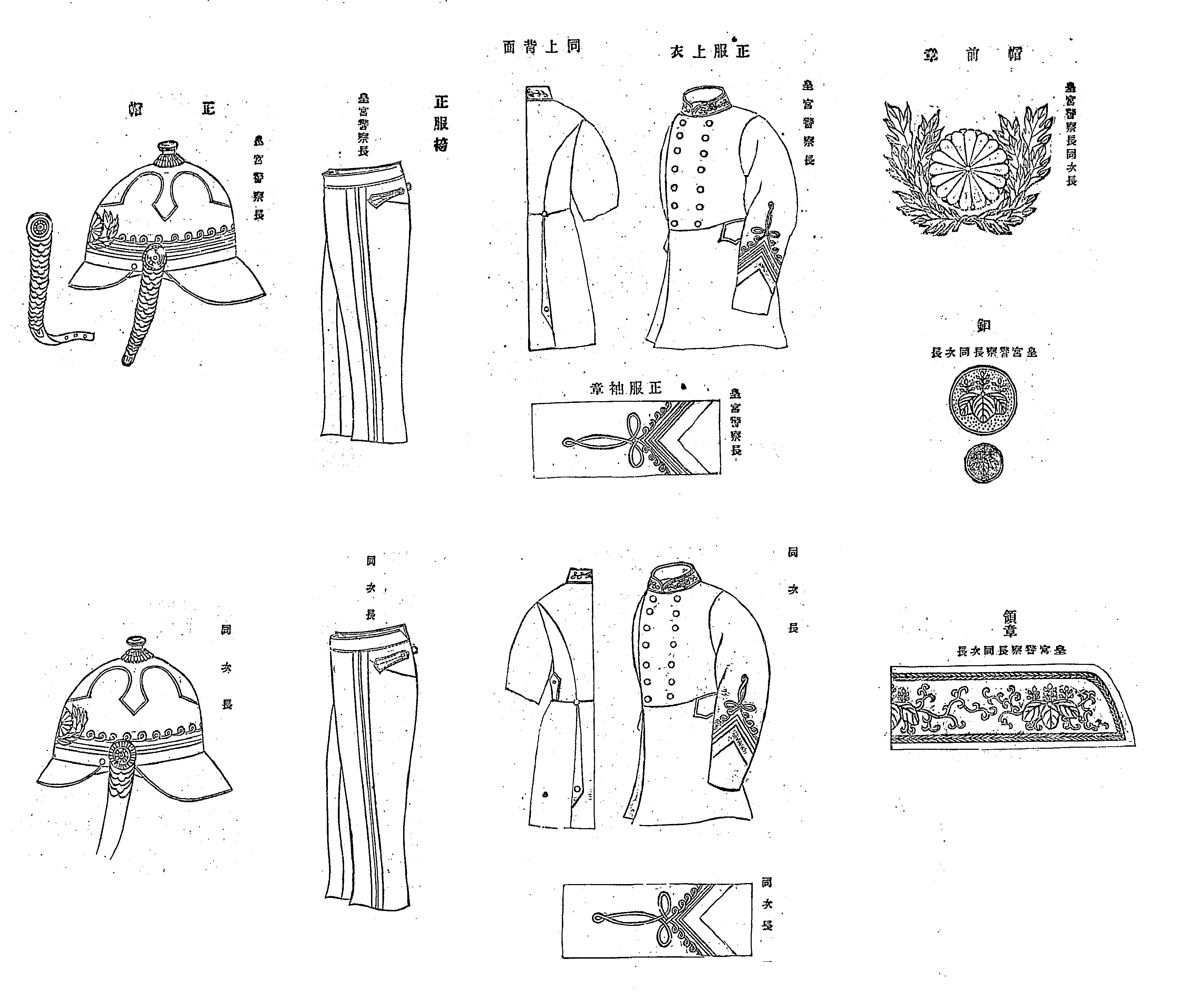
Imperial Guard Director and Vice Director

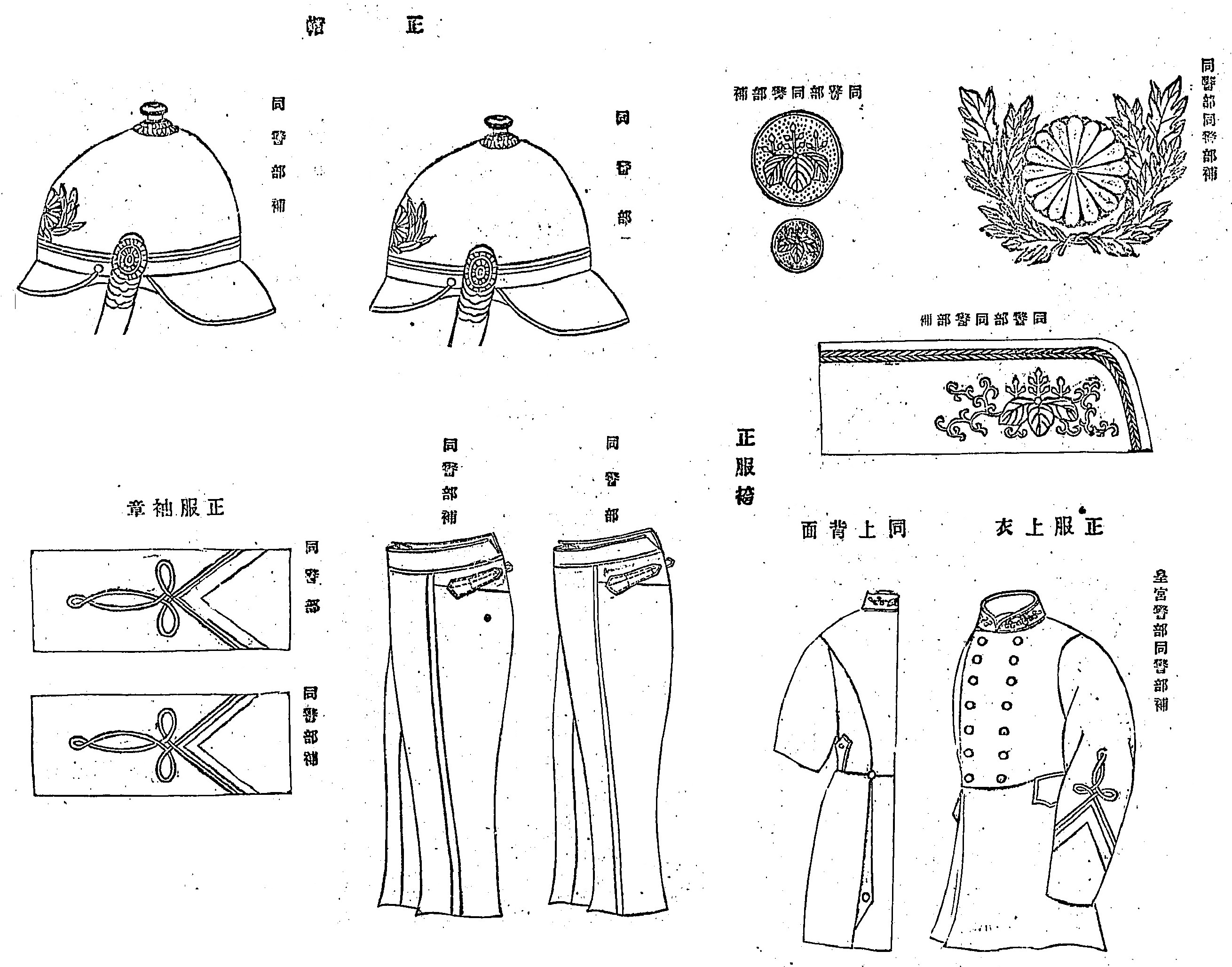
Imperial Guard Captains and Lieutenants

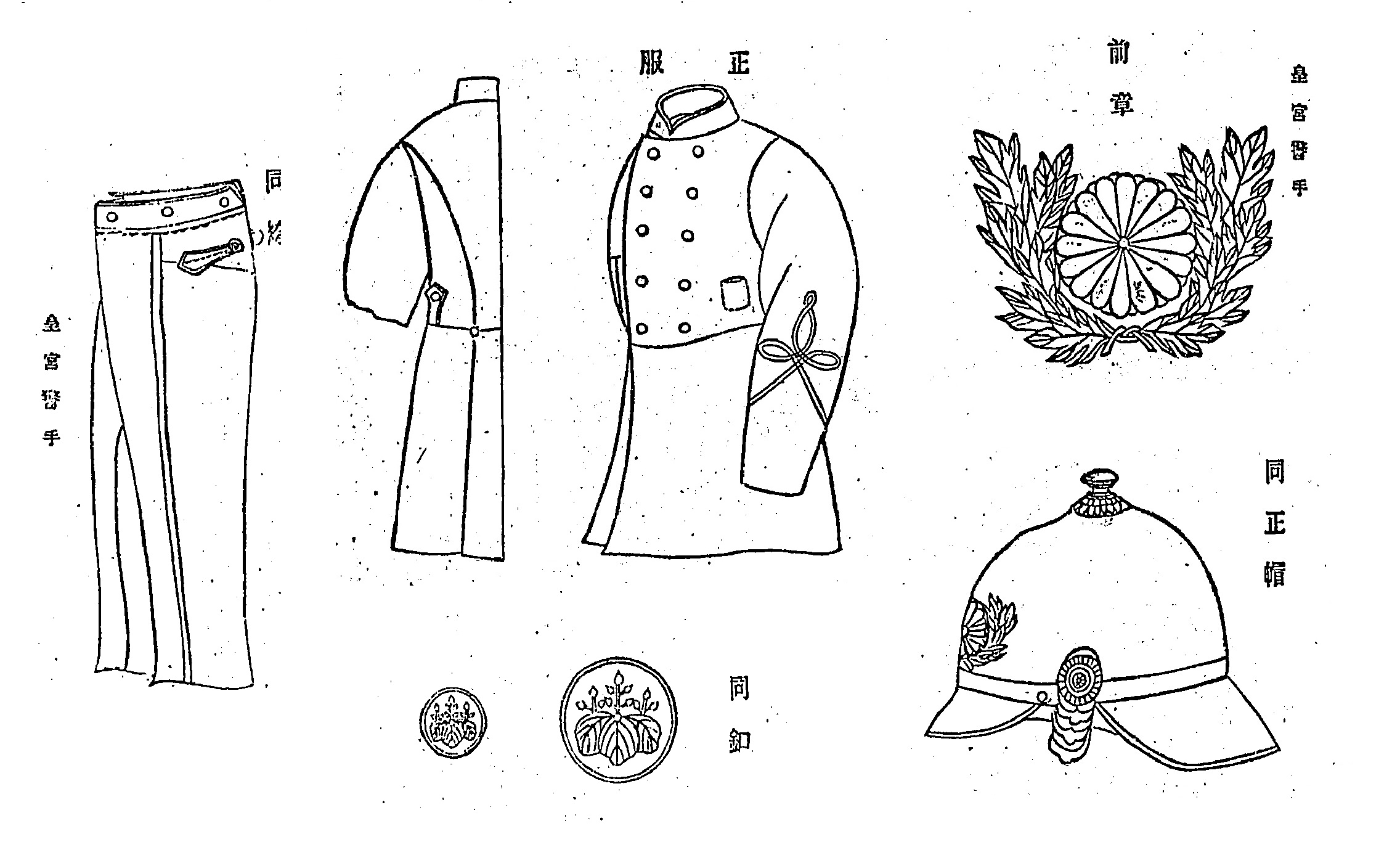
Imperial Guard patrolmen

=== 1888 designs ===
On September 24, 1888, a conference was held within the Ministry of the Imperial Household regarding uniforms for employees within the palace. The attendees were Minister of the Imperial Household Hijikata Hisamoto, head of the Board of Ceremonies Nabeshima Naohiro, Master of the Palace Table Iwakura Tomosada, Master of the Empress's Palace Kagawa Teizō, the director of the Bureau of Imperial Mews at the time (name unknown), and the foreign advisor Ottmar von Mohl.

As a result, in the winter of that year, high officials involved in supply management to the palace and hunting were assigned their own uniforms, as were various positions in the Bureau of Imperial Mews. Servants and coachmen were also assigned formal and informal court wear, as well as regular uniforms.

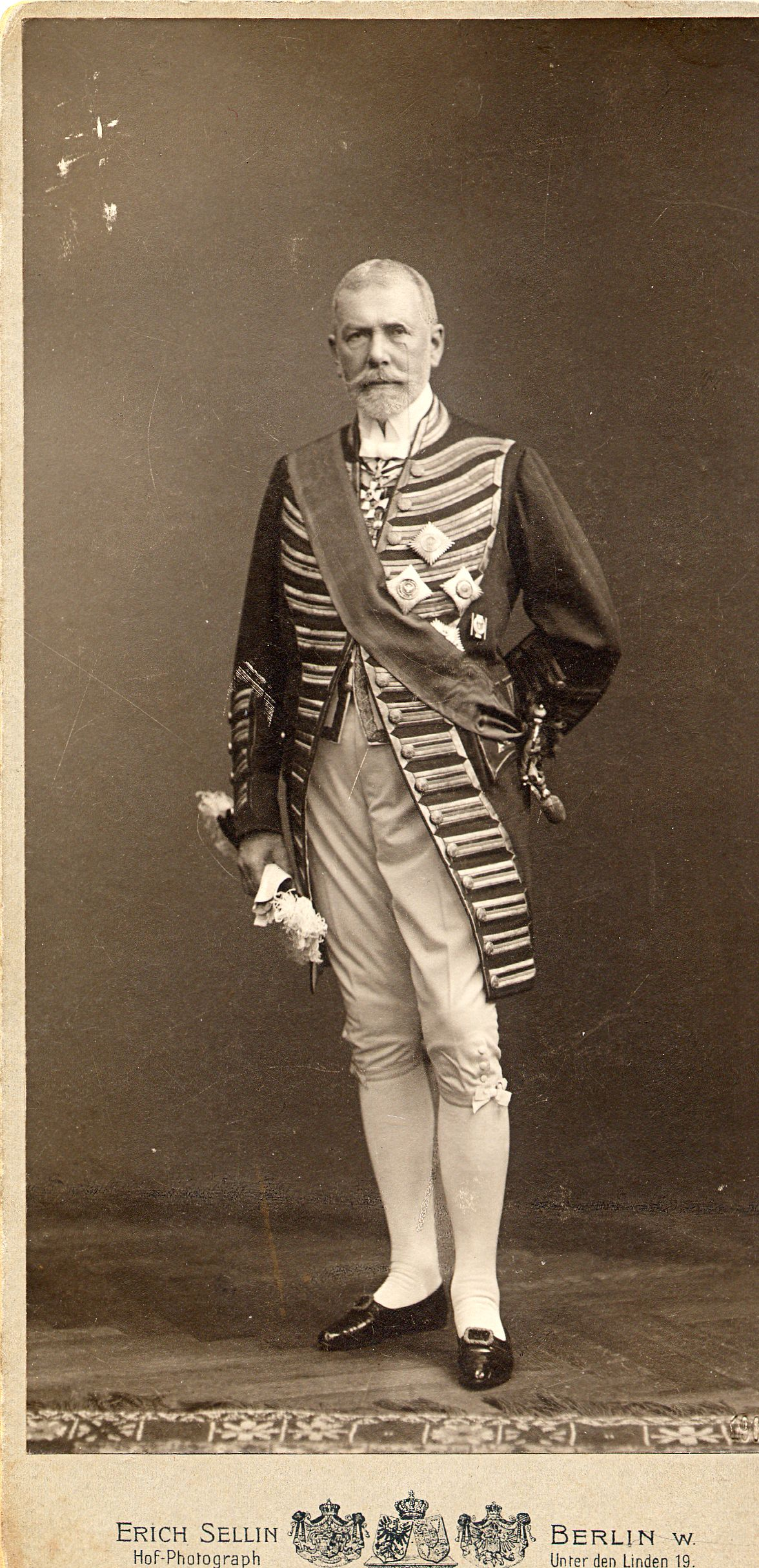
Ottmar von Mohl

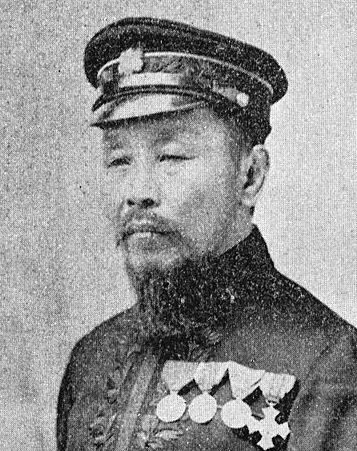
Hijikata Hisamoto (in 1891 escort dress)

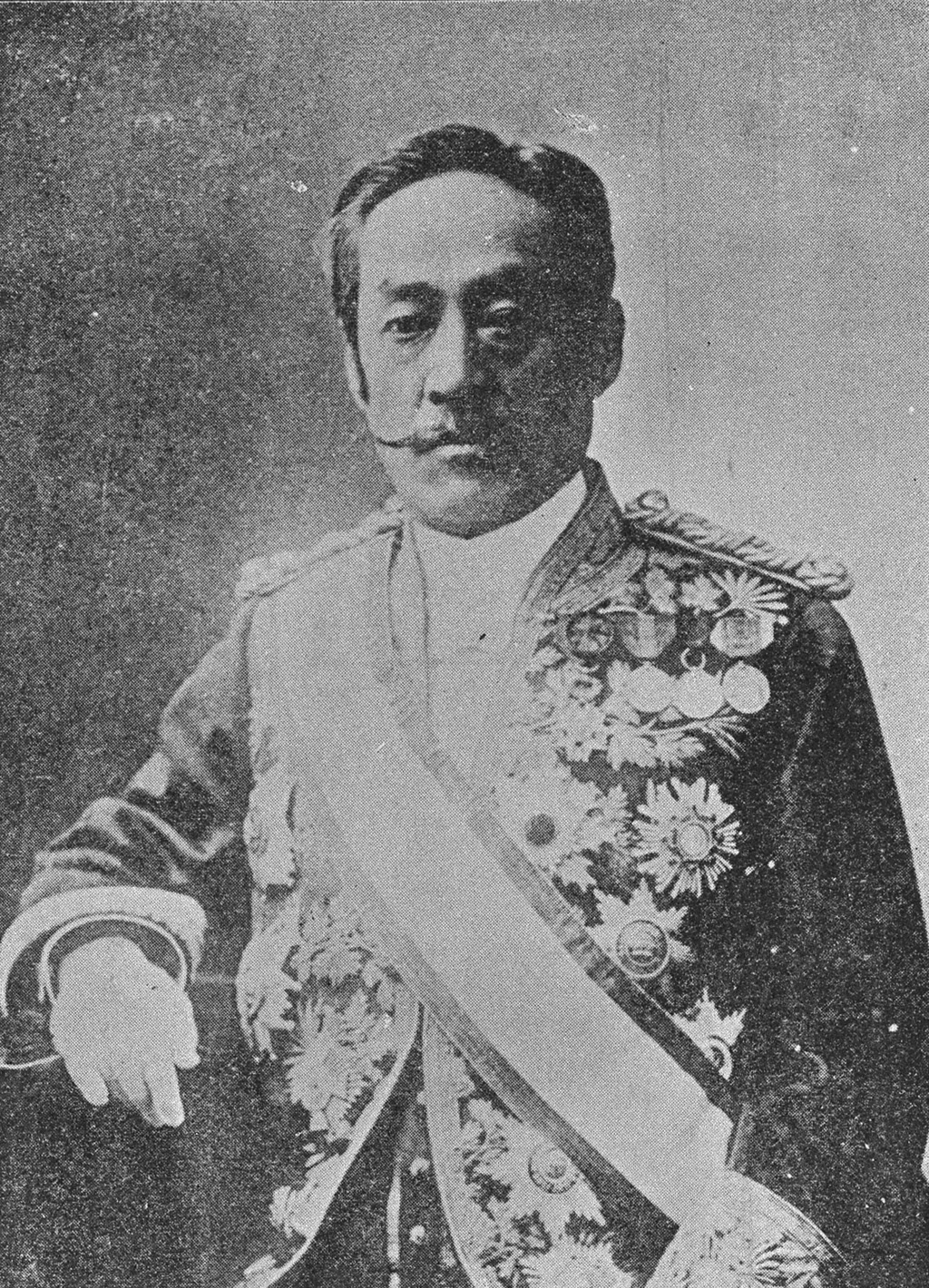
Iwakura Tomosada (in 1911 court uniform for Imperial Household Agency chokuninkan)

=== 1911 designs ===
Imperial Household Agency chokuninkan court uniforms to the 1911 standard

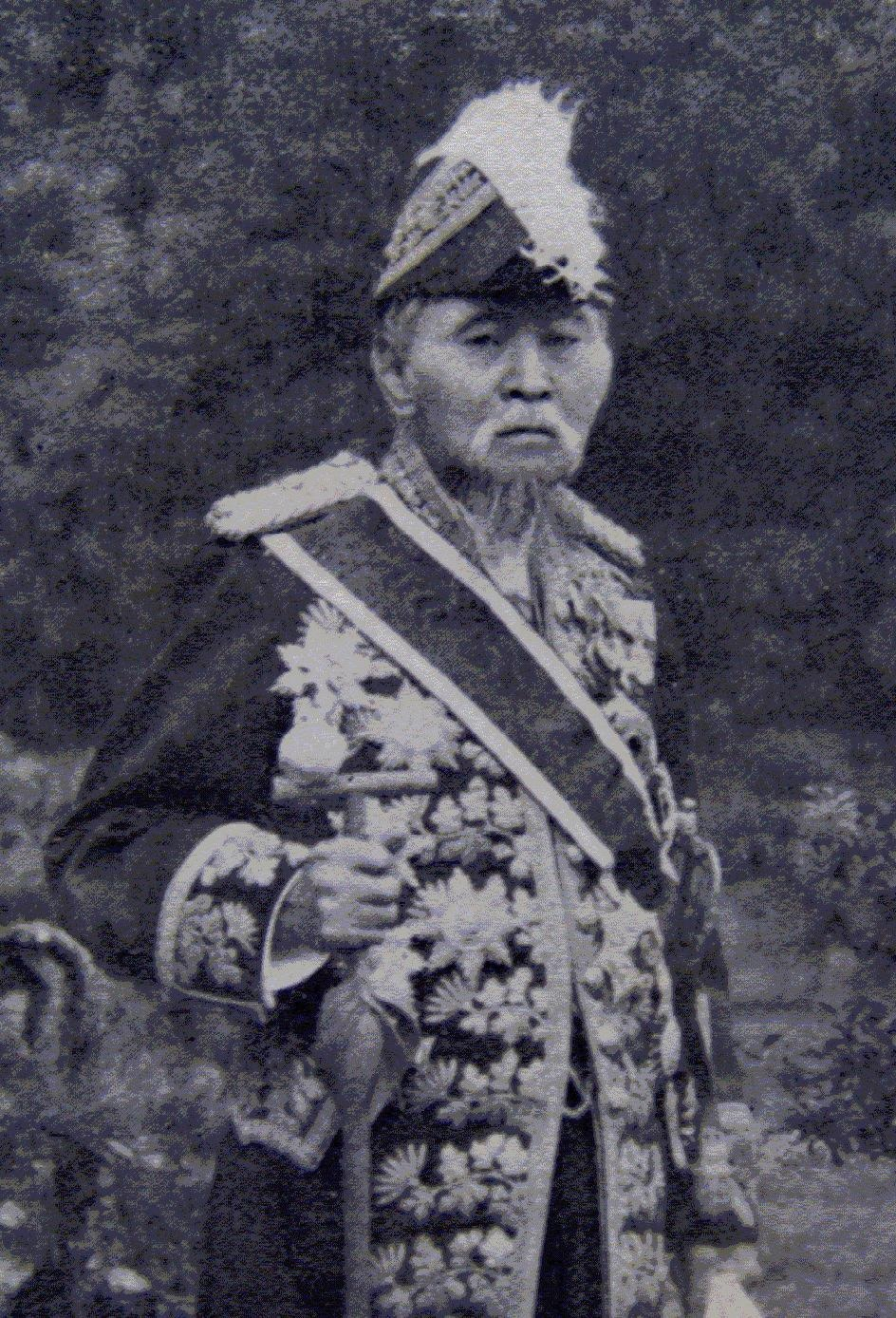
Hijikata Hisamoto

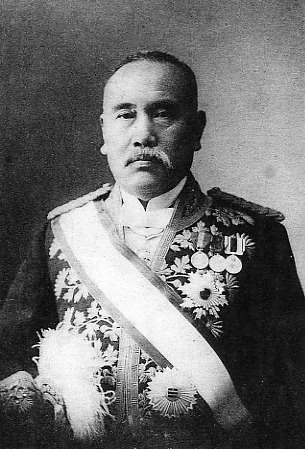
Katayama Tōkuma

On May 26, 1911, the Imperial Household Ordinance on Imperial Household Agency Uniforms abolished the 1884 and 1891 uniforms and unified the regulations. The main points of revision were the addition of shoulder-knot epaulets to the formal court uniforms of chokuninkan and the adoption of tunics as the formal court uniforms of high officials in the Bureau of Imperial Mews.

An earlier proposal, dated to May 9 of the same year, also included changes to the uniforms of low-ranking employees like Imperial Guard patrolmen, but the released ordinance delegated responsibility for the uniforms of Imperial Household Agency employees at or below sōninkan level to the Imperial Household Agency itself. The Imperial Household Agency released ordinances defining the uniforms for these employees the next day, on May 27. After this the uniforms that sōninkan-level and below officials wore in their duties, including those corresponding to court uniforms, were simply referred to as work uniforms (職服, shokufuku).

Diagrams from the May 27, 1911, revision

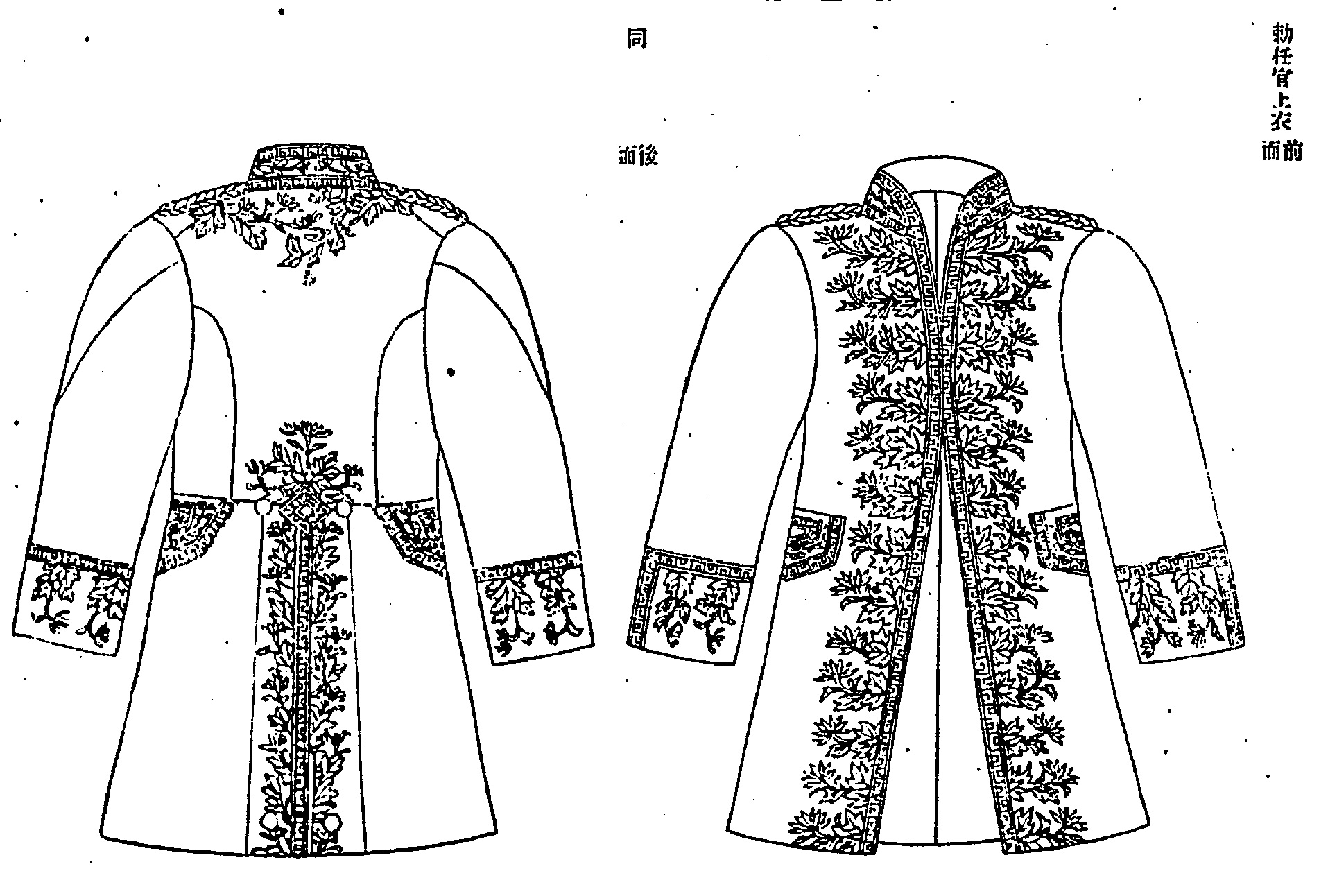
Chokuninkan

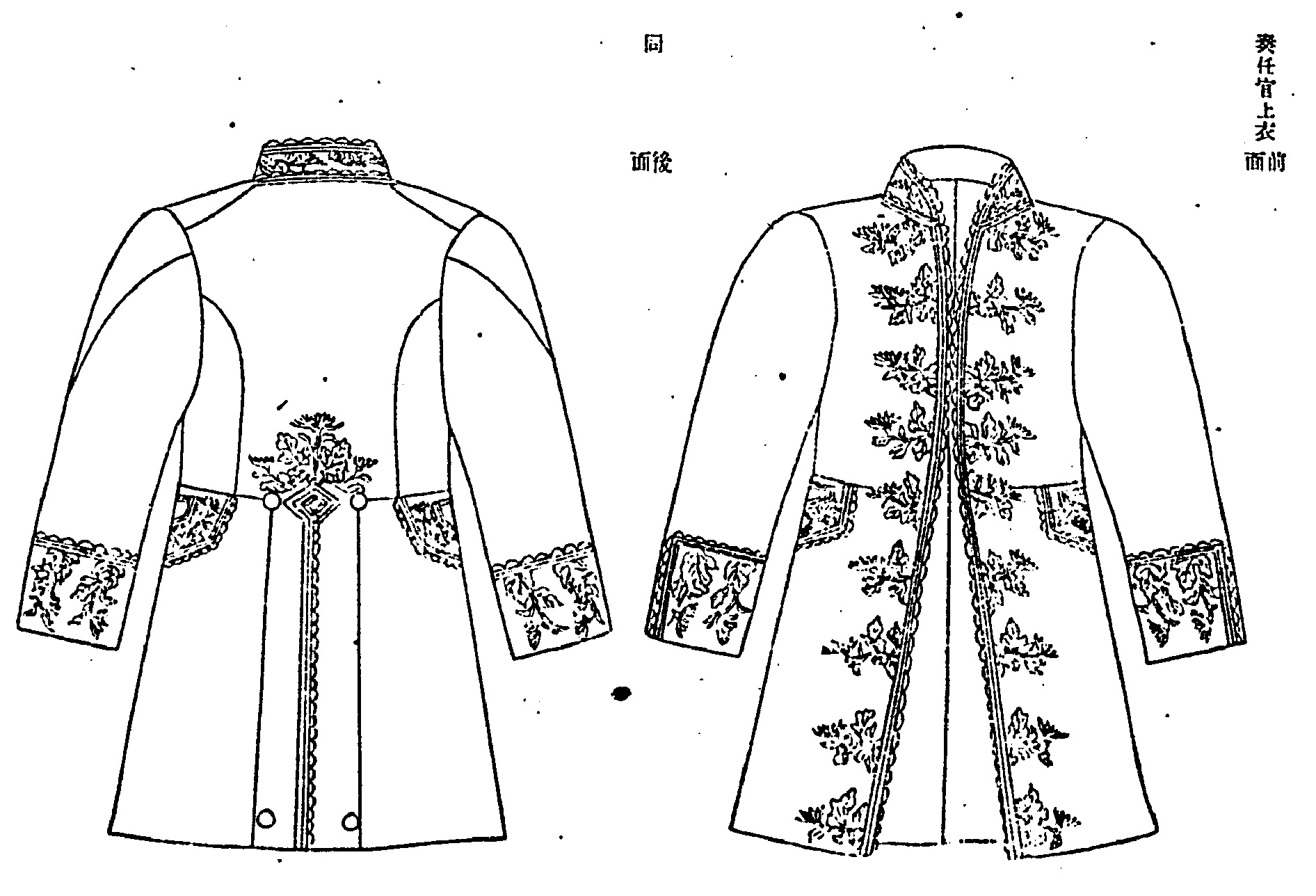
Sōninkan

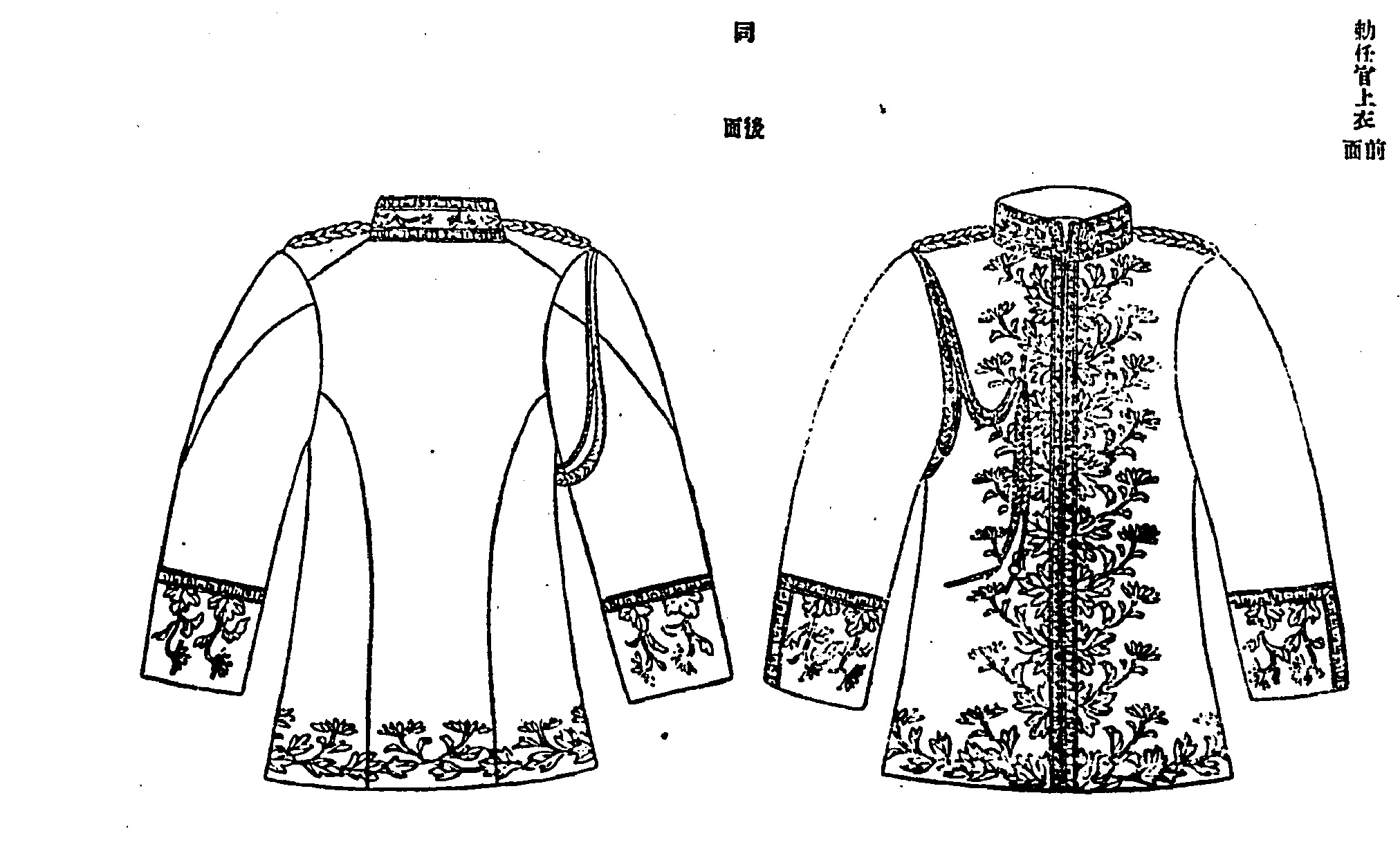
Bureau of Imperial Mews chokuninkan

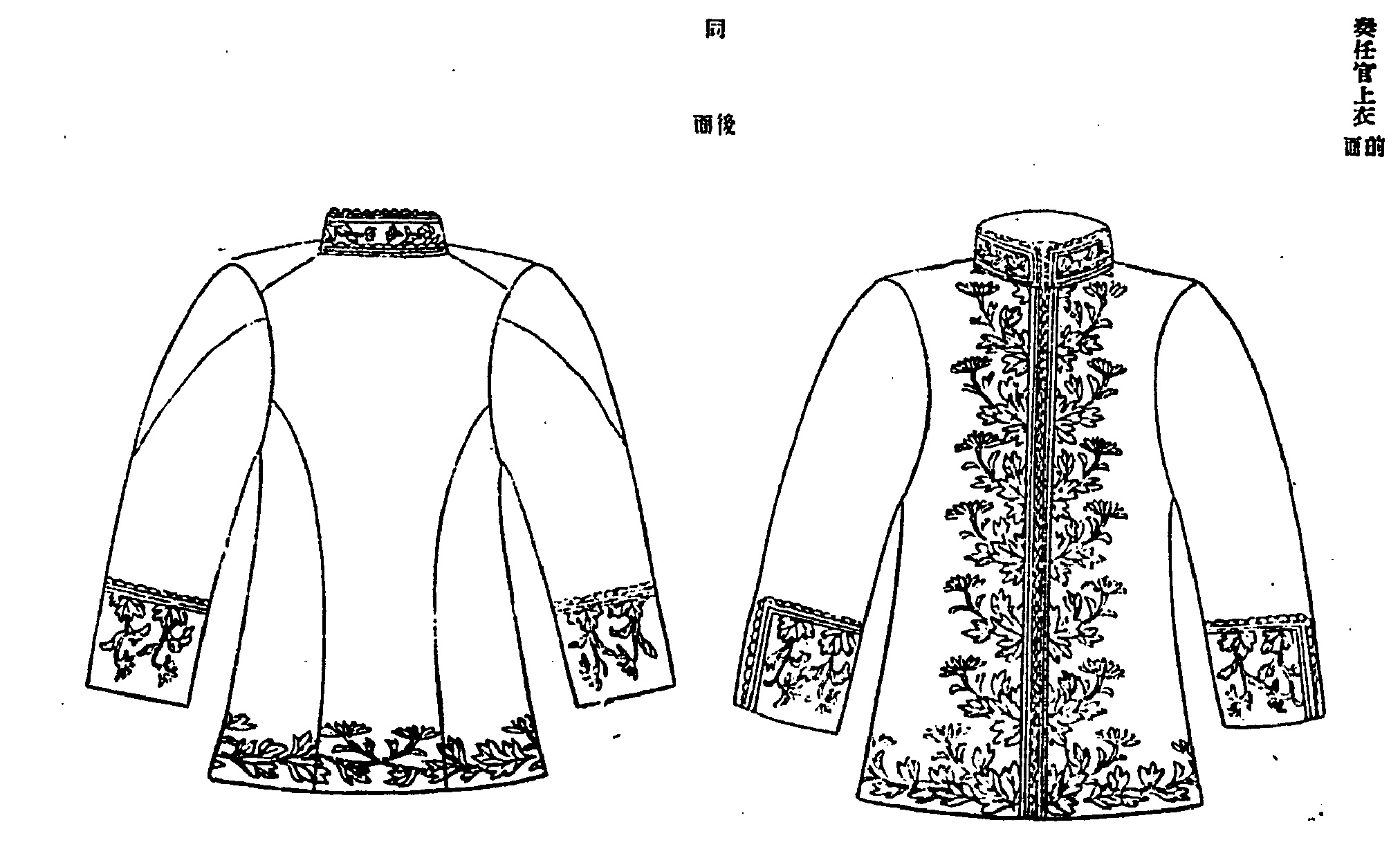
Bureau of Imperial Mews sōninkan

=== 1928 designs ===
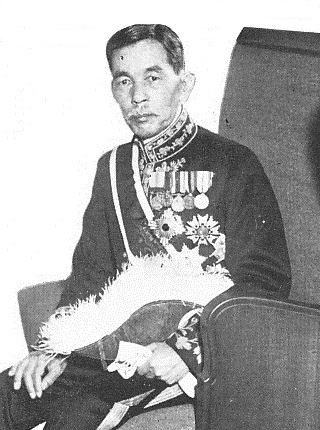
Ichiki Kitokurō (Imperial Household Minister)

The Ordinance on Imperial Household Agency Uniforms was modified on March 16, 1928. The uniforms for high officials outside the Bureau of Imperial Mews were changed from gowns to tailcoats, and their stand-up collars changed to a type that closed all the way to the top.

Diagrams from the March 16, 1928, revision

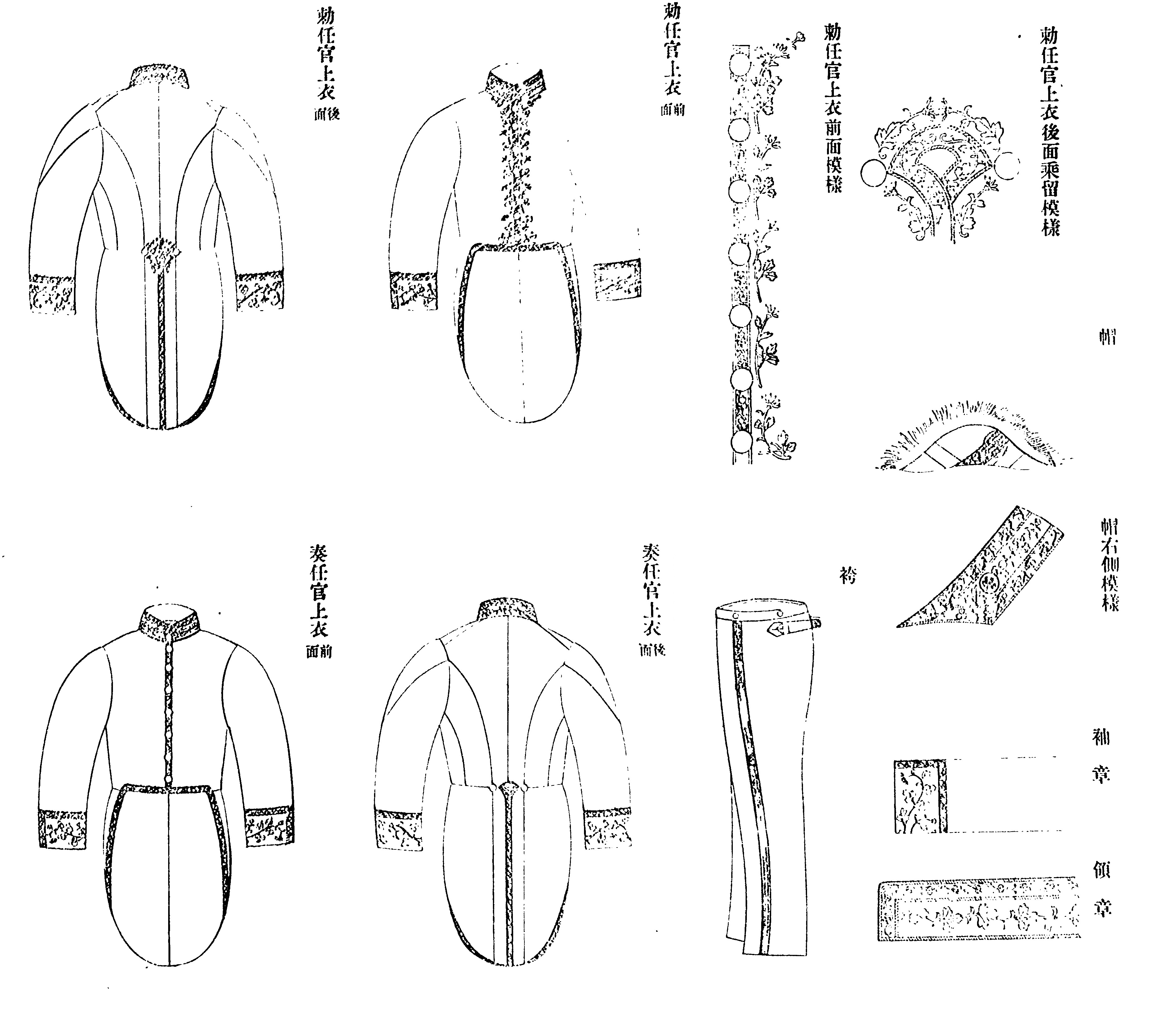
Chokuninkan

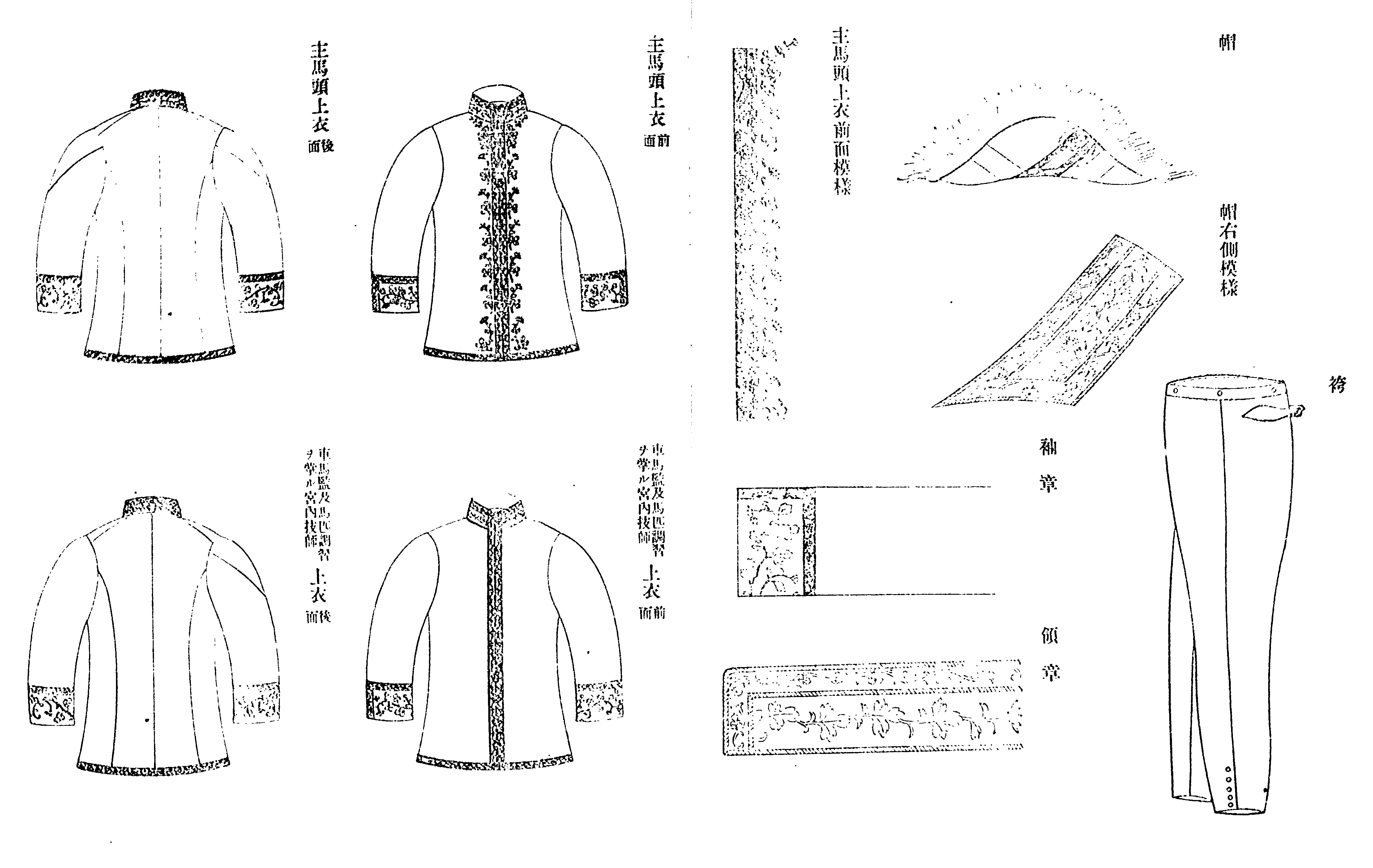
Bureau of Imperial Mews chokuninkan and sōninkan

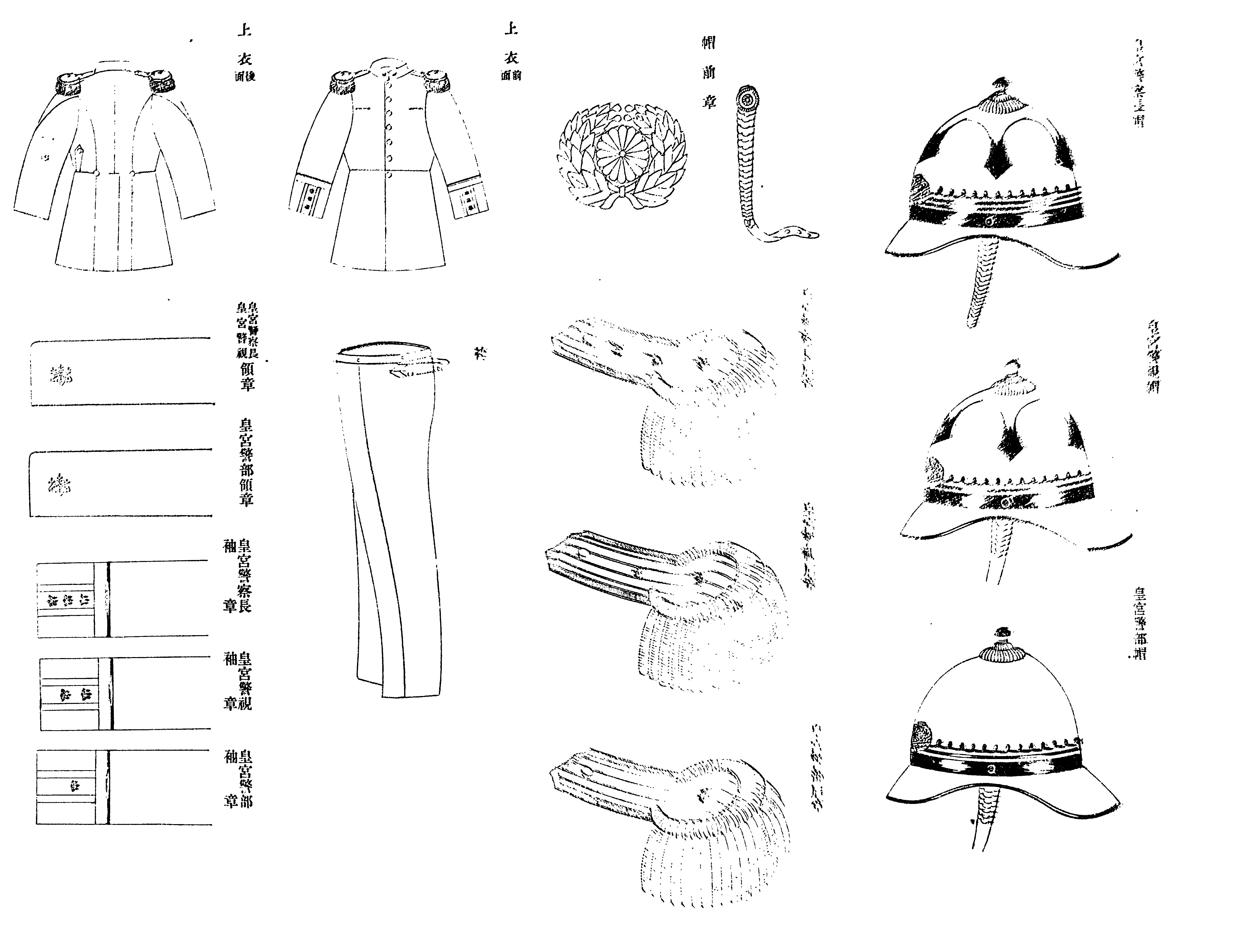
Imperial Guard officers

== Bibliography ==
- Tanno, Miyako (April 1999). 西洋服飾史 [A History of Western Attire] (in Japanese). Vol. Expanded and Revised Edition. Tokyodo Shuppan. ISBN 978-4-490-20367-7.
- Tanno, Miyako (September 2003). 西洋服飾史 [A History of Western Attire] (in Japanese). Vol. Diagrams. Tokyodo Shuppan. ISBN 978-4-490-20505-3.

=== Related laws ===
- Imperial Household Ordinance No. 22 of 1910. Chōsen kizoku taru yūshakusha taireifuku sei (朝鮮貴族タル有爵者大礼服制)
- Imperial Household Ordinance No. 5 of 1911. Hiyaku yūi taireifuku no bō ni kansuru ken (非役有位大礼服ノ帽ニ関スル件)
- Imperial Ordinance No. 15 of 1908. Gaikōkan oyobi ryōjikan taireifuku daiyō fukusei (外交官及領事官大礼服代用服制)
- Imperial Ordinance No. 311 of 1926. Nan'yō guntō zaikin bunkan reifuku daiyō fukusei (南洋群島在勤文官礼服代用服制)
