= Emperor Norton =

Self-proclaimed Emperor of the United States (1818–1880)

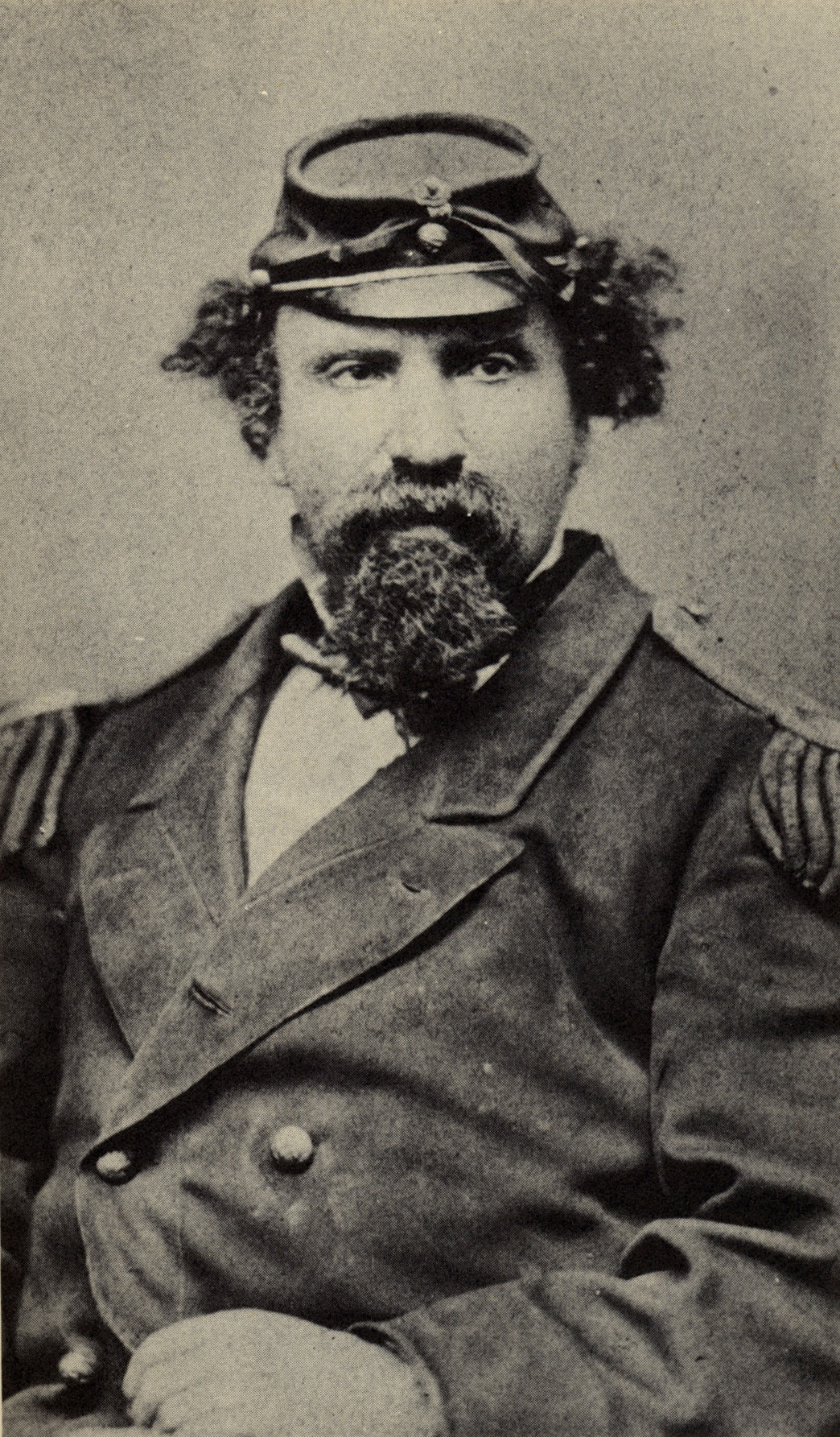
- Norton, c. 1871–72
- Born: Joshua Abraham Norton; February 4, 1818; Deptford, England
- Died: January 8, 1880 (aged 61); San Francisco, California, U.S.
- Resting place: Woodlawn Memorial Park, Colma, Calif. (originally buried in the Masonic Cemetery, San Francisco, Calif.; reburied in Woodlawn in 1934); 37°40′46″N 122°28′7″W
- Citizenship: United States
- Years active: 1859–1880
- Known for: Assuming the identity and titles of "Norton I," "Emperor of the United States," and "Protector of Mexico"; newspaper proclamations; personal style (regalia, etc.); proposing the construction of what opened as the San Francisco–Oakland Bay Bridge in 1936.

Joshua Abraham Norton (February 4, 1818 – January 8, 1880), also known as Emperor Norton, was a resident of San Francisco, California, who declared himself Emperor of the United States in 1859 and Protector of Mexico in 1866, roles that he maintained until his death in 1880. Norton proposed the construction of what eventually opened as the San Francisco–Oakland Bay Bridge in 1936.

Born in England and raised in South Africa, Norton left Cape Town in late 1845, sailing from Liverpool to Boston in early 1846 and eventually arriving in San Francisco in late 1849. After a brief period of prosperity, Norton made a business gambit in late 1852 that played out poorly, ultimately forcing him to declare bankruptcy in 1856.

Norton proclaimed himself "Emperor of the United States" in a proclamation that he signed "Norton I., Emperor of the United States." He justified his reign by citing a need for political stability shortly before the American Civil War (1861–1865). Norton took the secondary title "Protector of Mexico" in 1866 as a sign of his opposition towards the French intervention in Mexico (1863–1867).

Norton had no formal political power yet acted as emperor for the rest of his life, and was treated deferentially in San Francisco and elsewhere in California. He issued currency in his name that was honored in some of the establishments he frequented. San Francisco merchants capitalized on Norton's notoriety by selling souvenirs bearing his image. Norton received free ferry and train passage and a variety of favors, such as help with rent and free meals, from well-placed friends and sympathizers. Some considered Norton to be insane or eccentric, but residents of San Francisco and the city's larger Northern California orbit enjoyed his imperial presence and took note of his frequent newspaper proclamations.

Norton was the basis for characters created by Mark Twain, Robert Louis Stevenson, Christopher Moore, Morris and René Goscinny, Selma Lagerlöf, Neil Gaiman, Mircea Cărtărescu, and Charles Bukowski. Norton and his proposal for the Bay Bridge were featured on an episode of Bonanza.

== Early life ==
Norton's parents were John Norton (1794–1848) and Sarah Norden (1796–1846), who were English Jews. John was a farmer and merchant, and Sarah was a daughter of Abraham Norden and a sister of Benjamin Norden, a successful merchant. The family lived in the Kentish town of Deptford, England — today part of London — before moving to South Africa in early 1820 as part of a government-backed colonial scheme whose participants came to be known as the 1820 Settlers.

There is not a birth record for Norton, but he was most likely born in Deptford. A substantial body of evidence points to February 4, 1818 as his birth date.

Obituaries published in 1880, following Norton's death, offered conflicting information about his date of birth. The second of two obituaries in the San Francisco Chronicle, "following the best information obtainable," cited the silver plate on his coffin which said he was "aged about 65," suggesting that 1815 was the year of his birth. Norton's biographer, William Drury, points out that "about 65" was based solely on the guess that Norton's landlady offered to the coroner at the inquest following his death. In a 1923 essay published by the California Historical Society, Robert Ernest Cowan claimed that Norton was born on February 4, 1819. However, the passenger lists for the La Belle Alliance, the ship that carried Norton and his family from England to South Africa, list him as having been two years old when the ship set sail in February 1820.

Raised and educated in Grahamstown, Joshua Norton moved to Port Elizabeth in 1839. Here, with money from his father, Norton went into business with his brother-in-law, Henry Benjamin Kisch. The business failed after 18 months, and Norton was employed as an auctioneer in Port Elizabeth as late as 1843. Sometime in 1843 or 1844, Norton moved to Cape Town, where he joined his father's business.

Joshua Norton left Cape Town in late 1845 and arrived in Boston via the ship Sunbeam from Liverpool on March 12, 1846. At various times, Norton claimed to have arrived in San Francisco aboard a ship from Rio de Janeiro in November 1849. He had success in commodities markets and in real estate speculation, and by late 1852, he was one of the more prosperous, respected citizens of the city.

Norton's failed effort to corner the rice market in December 1852 set in motion a cascade of events — a rice contract dispute that he lost in the California Supreme Court in October 1854; the court-ordered foreclosure of all of his real estate interests; and loss of business clients — that forced him to declare bankruptcy in August 1856.

In September 1857, he served on a jury for a case of a man accused of stealing a bar of gold from Wells, Fargo & Co. and, in August 1858, Norton ran an ad announcing his candidacy for US Congress.

== Reign as Emperor ==
=== Declaring himself "Emperor" ===
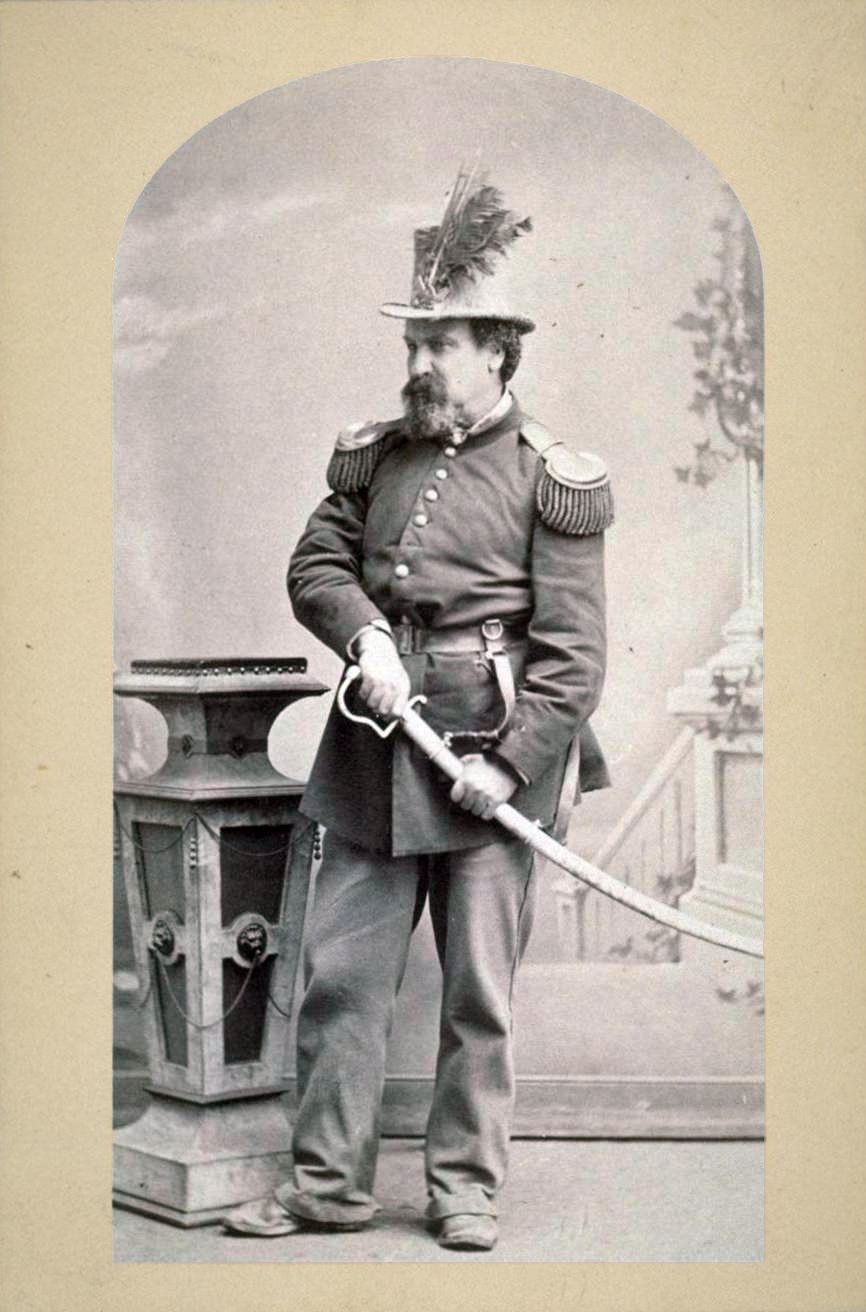
Emperor Norton in full dress uniform and military regalia, his hand on the hilt of a ceremonial sabre, c. 1875

By 1859, Norton had become completely discontented with what he considered the inadequacies of the legal and political structures of the United States. In July 1859, he issued a brief manifesto addressed to the "Citizens of the Union". It outlined in the broadest terms the national crisis as Norton saw it and suggested the imperative for action to address this crisis at the most basic level. The manifesto ran as a paid ad in the San Francisco Daily Evening Bulletin.

Two months later, on September 17, 1859, Norton hand-delivered the following letter declaring himself "Emperor of these United States" to the offices of the Bulletin:

At the peremptory request and desire of a large majority of the citizens of these United States, I, Joshua Norton, formerly of Algoa Bay, Cape of Good Hope, and now for the last 9 years and 10 months past of San Francisco, California, declare and proclaim myself Emperor of these United States; and in virtue of the authority thereby in me vested, do hereby order and direct the representatives of the different States of the Union to assemble in Musical Hall, of this city, on the 1st day of February next, then and there to make such alterations in the existing laws of the Union as may ameliorate the evils under which the country is laboring, and thereby cause confidence to exist, both at home and abroad, in our stability and integrity.

— NORTON I., Emperor of the United States.

The paper printed the letter in that evening's edition, for humorous effect, and thus began Norton's whimsical 20-year "reign" over the United States.

Norton rides a bicycle, 1869

Norton issued numerous decrees on matters of state, including a decree on October 12, 1859, to formally abolish the United States Congress. In this same decree, Norton repeated his order that all interested parties assemble at Musical Hall in San Francisco in February 1860 to "remedy the evil complained of."

In an imperial decree issued in January 1860, Norton summoned the Army to depose the elected officials of the US Congress:

WHEREAS, a body of men calling themselves the National Congress are now in session in Washington City, in violation of our Imperial edict of the 12th of October last, declaring the said Congress abolished;

WHEREAS, it is necessary for the repose of our Empire that the said decree should be strictly complied with;

NOW, THEREFORE, we do hereby Order and Direct Major-General Scott, the Commander-in-Chief of our Armies, immediately upon receipt of this, our Decree, to proceed with a suitable force and clear the Halls of Congress.

Norton's orders were ignored by the Army and Congress. A decree in July 1860 ordered the dissolution of the republic in favor of a temporary monarchy. Norton issued a mandate in 1862 ordering both the Roman Catholic Church and the Protestant churches to publicly ordain him as "Emperor," hoping to resolve the many disputes that had resulted in the Civil War.

Portrait by Bradley & Rulofson, probably 1867

Norton then turned his attention to other matters, both political and social. In a proclamation dated August 12, 1869, and published in the San Francisco Daily Herald, he declared the abolition of the Democratic and Republican parties, explaining that he was "desirous of allaying the dissensions of party strife now existing within our realm."

The failure to treat Norton's adopted home city with appropriate respect was the subject of a particularly stern edict that often is cited as having been written by Norton in 1872, although evidence is elusive for the authorship, date, or source of this decree:

Whoever after due and proper warning shall be heard to utter the abominable word "Frisco", which has no linguistic or other warrant, shall be deemed guilty of a High Misdemeanor, and shall pay into the Imperial Treasury as penalty the sum of twenty-five dollars.

Norton explicitly forbade any form of conflict between religions or their sects, and he issued several decrees calling for the construction of a suspension bridge or tunnel connecting Oakland and San Francisco. Long after his death, similar structures were built in the form of the San Francisco–Oakland Bay Bridge and the Transbay Tube, and there have been efforts since the 1930s to name the Bay Bridge after Emperor Norton or at least to add "Emperor Norton Bridge" as an honorary name for the bridge.

=== Norton's imperial acts ===
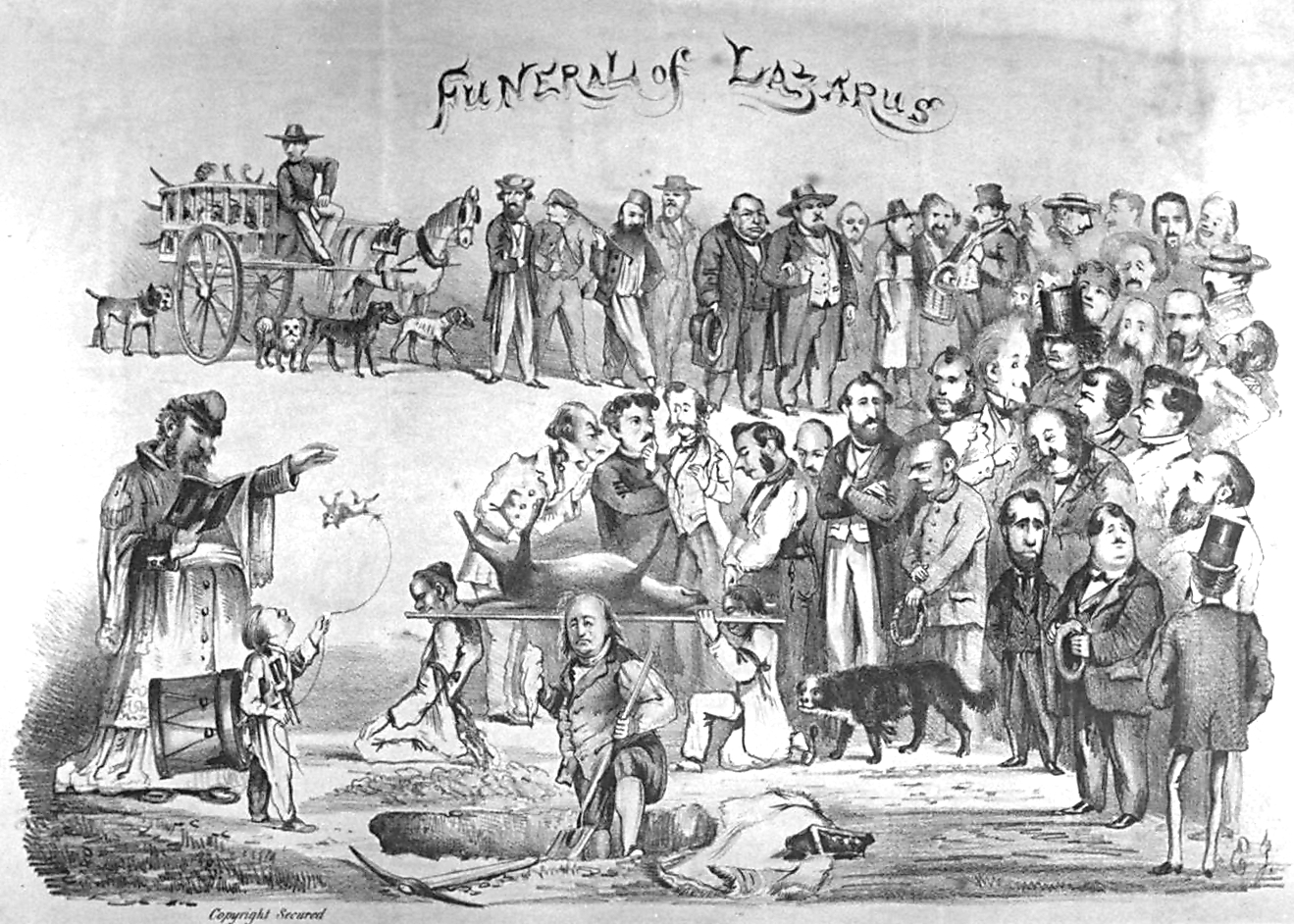
A fanciful depiction of Norton dressed as the Pope at the funeral of the itinerant dog Lazarus

By 1865 — and for the remainder of his life — Norton lived in a small room on the top floor of the Eureka Lodgings, a 3-story rooming house at 624 Commercial Street between Montgomery and Kearny streets. The building that housed the Eureka was lost in the earthquake and fires of April 1906. On this site now stands a 4-story apartment building at 650–654 Commercial.

When he wasn't reading newspapers and writing proclamations, Norton spent most of his days as Emperor walking the streets, spending time in parks and libraries, and paying visits to newspaper offices and old friends in San Francisco, Oakland and Berkeley. In the evenings, he often was seen at political gatherings or at theatrical or musical performances.

He wore an elaborate blue uniform with gold-plated epaulettes, at some time given to him secondhand by officers of the United States Army post at the Presidio of San Francisco. He embellished that with a variety of accoutrements, including a beaver hat decorated with a peacock or ostrich feathers and a rosette, a walking stick, and an umbrella. In the course of his rounds, he took note of the condition of the sidewalks and cable cars, the state of repair of public property, and the appearance of police officers. He also often had conversations on the issues of the day with those he encountered.

Caricaturist Edward Jump often depicted Norton with two noted stray dogs named Bummer and Lazarus, giving rise to the rumor that the dogs were Norton's pets. There is no evidence to support this.

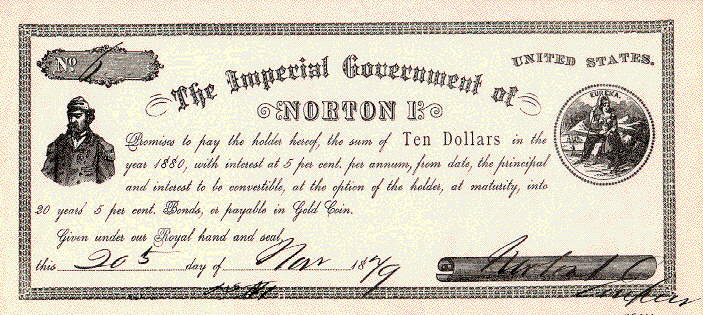
A ten dollar note issued by the imperial government of Norton I

Special officer Armand Barbier was part of a local auxiliary force whose members were called "policemen," although they were private security guards paid by neighborhood residents and business owners. He arrested Norton in 1867 to commit him to involuntary treatment for a mental disorder. The arrest outraged many citizens and sparked scathing editorials in the newspapers, including the Daily Alta California, which wrote "that he had shed no blood; robbed no one; and despoiled no country; which is more than can be said of his fellows in that line." In response to this widespread backlash, Police Chief Patrick Crowley ordered Norton released and issued a formal apology on behalf of the police force, and Norton granted an Imperial Pardon to Barbier. Police officers of San Francisco thereafter saluted Norton as he passed in the street.

Norton did receive some tokens of recognition for his position. The 1870 U.S. census lists Joshua Norton as 50 years old and residing at 624 Commercial Street, with his occupation listed as "Emperor." It also notes that he was insane. (However, the U.S. Census instructions state "The fact of idiocy will be better determined by the common consent of the neighborhood, than by attempting to apply any scientific measure to the weakness of the mind or will.")

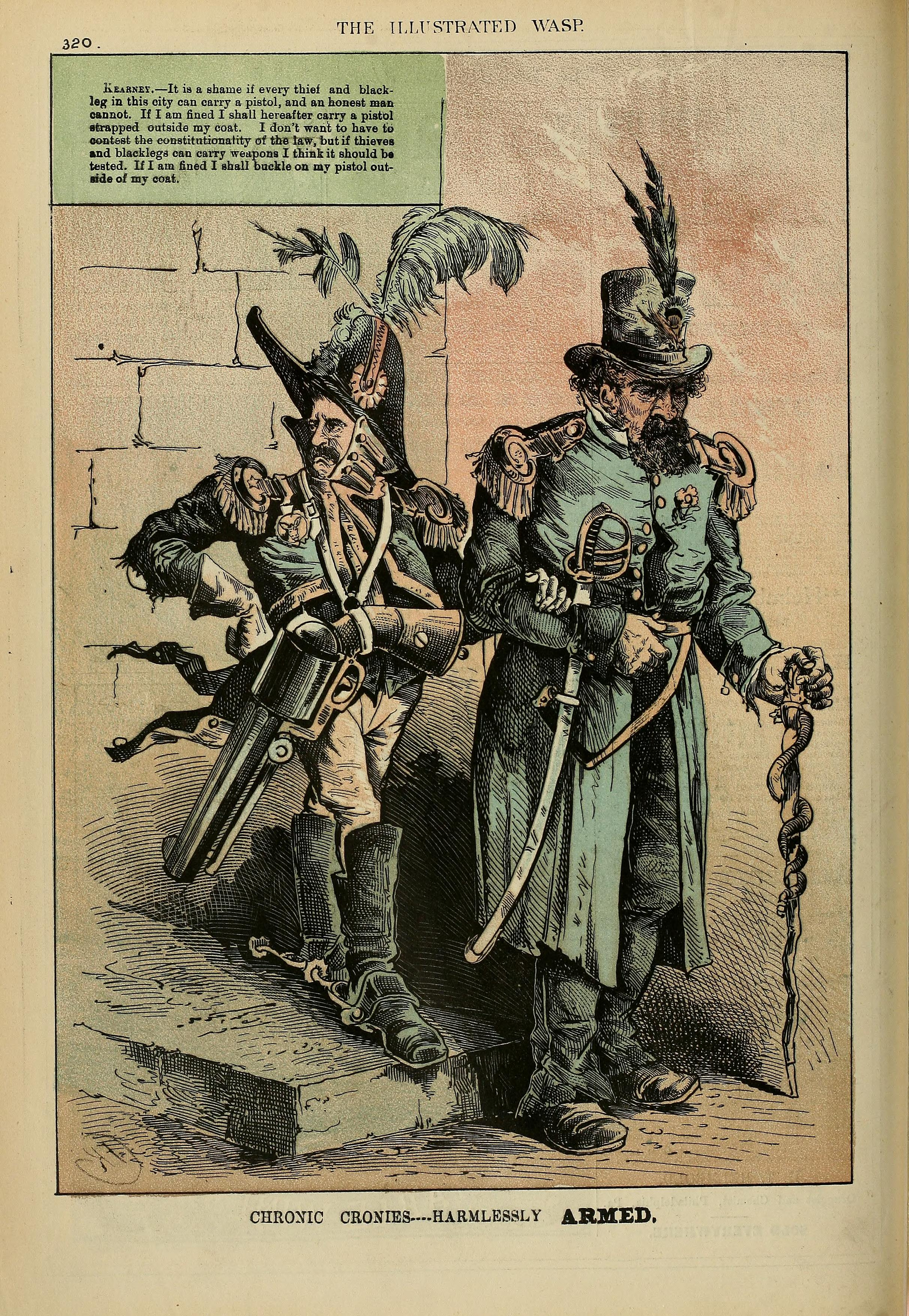
"Chronic Cronies----Harmlessly ARMED," a caricature of Norton (right) and Denis Kearney by George Frederick Keller published in The Wasp mocking them for the weapons they carried, December 6, 1879

During the 1860s and 1870s, there were occasional anti-Chinese demonstrations in the poorer districts of San Francisco, and riots took place, sometimes resulting in fatalities. Starting in the late 1870s, those riots were fomented at rallies on Sunday afternoons at the sandlots across from City Hall. The rallies were led by Denis Kearney, a leader of the anti-Chinese Workingmen's Party of California. At a sandlot rally held on April 28, 1878, Emperor Norton appeared just before the start of proceedings, stood on a small box and challenged Kearney directly, telling him and the assembled crowd to disperse and go home. Norton was unsuccessful, but the incident was widely reported in local papers over the next couple of days.

Norton issued his own money in the form of scrip, or promissory notes, which were accepted from him by some restaurants in San Francisco. The notes came in denominations between fifty cents and ten dollars, and the few surviving ones are collector's items that routinely sell for more than $10,000 at auction.

=== Foreign relations ===
Throughout his reign, Norton commented on the policies and actions of foreign governments, issuing proclamations and sending letters to foreign leaders in attempts to establish congenial and fruitful relations with them and their countries and, if he felt it necessary, to coax better behavior.

Responding to instability in Mexico, Norton expanded his title to "Emperor of the United States and Mexico" in 1861. In 1862, the French Empire invaded Mexico after the latter was unable to pay war reparations following the disastrous Reform War. Two years later, in 1864, Napoleon III, then Emperor of the French, installed the Habsburg Maximilian I as his puppet ruler. Norton had stopped calling himself "Emperor" of Mexico and added the secondary title "Protector of Mexico" by early 1866. Contrary to the oft-repeated claim that he dropped the title shortly thereafter, Norton continued to identify and sign himself "Protector of Mexico" for the rest of his life.

Norton wrote many letters to Queen Victoria, including a suggestion that they marry to strengthen ties between their nations. That proved futile because the queen never responded.

Norton also sent at least one letter to Kamehameha V, the King of Hawaii at the time, regarding an estate in the Kingdom of Hawaii.

=== Later years and death ===
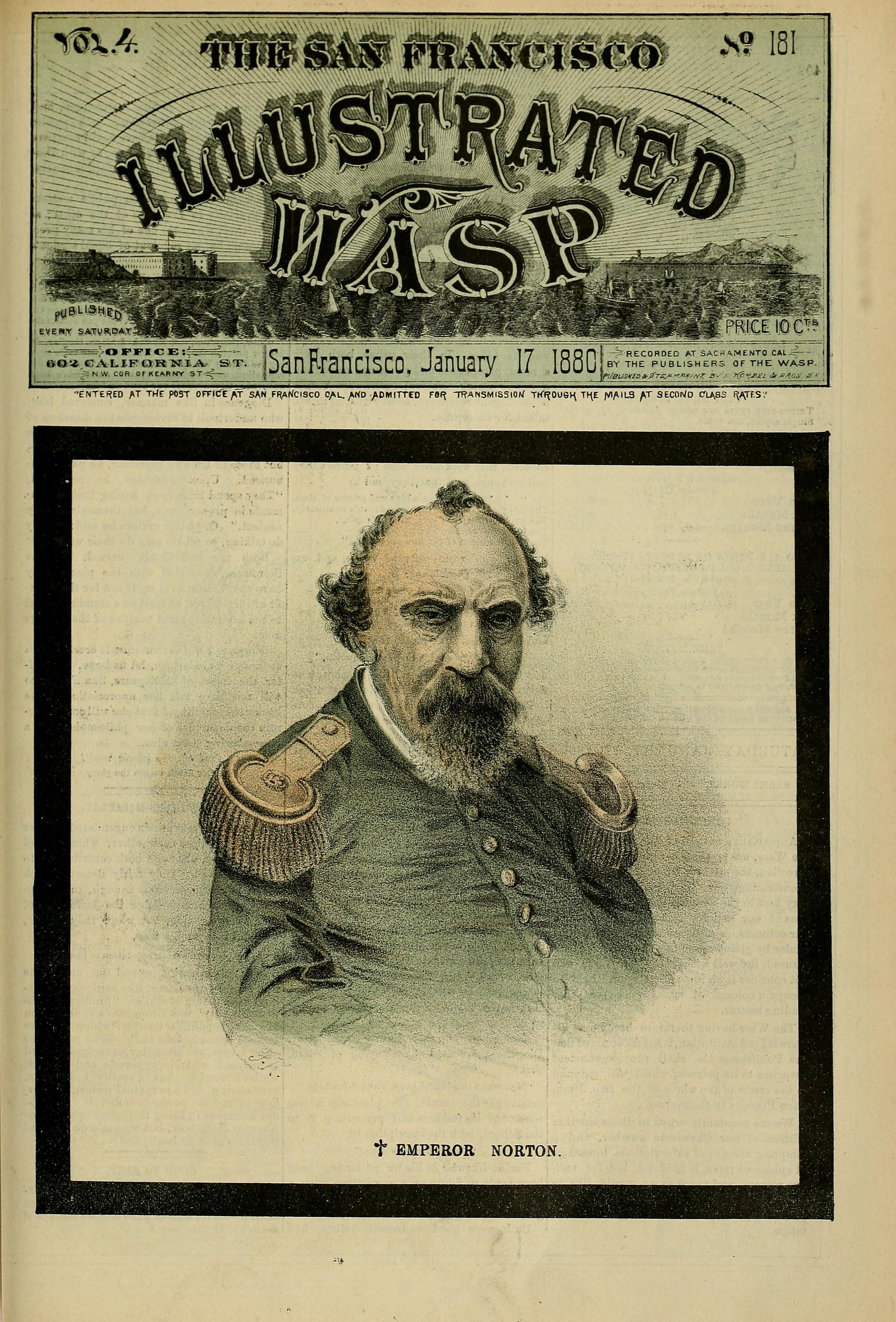
Norton on the cover of The Wasp shortly after his death, January 17, 1880

Norton was the subject of many tales. One popular story suggested that he was the son of Emperor Napoleon III and that his claim of coming from South Africa was a ruse to prevent persecution. To have been an illegitimate son of Napoleon III, he would have had to have been conceived when the French Emperor was only nine; the Emperor's actual illegitimate sons, Eugène and Alexandre, became minor French aristocrats. His legitimate son, Louis-Napoléon, Prince Imperial, died fighting in the Anglo-Zulu War in 1879. Rumors also circulated that Norton was supremely wealthy and was feigning poverty because he was miserly.

Starting a few years after Norton declared himself emperor, local newspapers, notably the Daily Alta California, began to print fictitious decrees. It is believed that newspaper editors themselves drafted the fake proclamations to suit their own agendas. Weary of that, in December 1870 Norton named the black-owned and -operated Pacific Appeal as his "imperial organ." Between September 1870 and May 1875, the Appeal published some 250 proclamations over the signature of Norton I. Historians and researchers who have studied Norton closely generally regard those proclamations as being authentic.

On the evening of Thursday, January 8, 1880, Norton collapsed on the corner of California Street and Dupont Street (now Grant Avenue), across the street from Old Saint Mary's Cathedral, while on his way to a debate at the California Academy of Sciences. His collapse was immediately noticed, and "the police officer on the beat hastened for a carriage to convey him to the City Receiving Hospital," according to the next day's obituary in the San Francisco Morning Call. Norton died before a carriage could arrive. The Call reported: "On the reeking pavement, in the darkness of a moonless night, under the dripping rain ... Norton I, by the grace of God, Emperor of the United States and Protector of Mexico, departed this life." Two days later, the San Francisco Chronicle led its article on Norton's funeral with the headline "Le Roi Est Mort." (lit. "The King is dead", and the first half of the traditional proclamation of a new king).

It quickly became evident that Norton had died in complete poverty, contrary to rumors of wealth. Five or six dollars in small change was found on his person, and a search of his room at the Eureka Lodgings turned up a single gold sovereign, worth around $2.50. His possessions included his collection of walking sticks, his rather battered sabre, a variety of headgear, including a stovepipe, a derby, a red-laced Army cap, and another cap suited to a martial band-master. There was an 1828 French franc and a handful of the Imperial bonds that he sold to tourists at a fictitious 7% interest. Also found were fake telegrams, including one purporting to be from Tsar Alexander II of Russia congratulating Norton on his forthcoming marriage to Queen Victoria and another from the President of France predicting that such a union would be disastrous to world peace. Also found were his letters to Queen Victoria and 98 shares of stock in a defunct gold mine.

Initial funeral arrangements were for a pauper's coffin of simple redwood. However, members of a San Francisco businessmen's association, the Pacific Club, established a funeral fund that provided for a handsome rosewood casket and arranged a dignified farewell. Norton's funeral on Saturday, January 10, was solemn, mournful, and large. Paying their respects were members of "all classes from capitalists to the pauper, the clergyman to the pickpocket, well-dressed ladies and those whose garb and bearing hinted of the social outcast". The next day, the San Francisco Chronicle reported, under the headline "Le Roi Est Mort," that some 10,000 people had come to view the emperor's body in advance of the 2 p.m. funeral. Notwithstanding the later legend of a "two-mile-long cortege," the Chronicle reported in the same article that people lined the streets for only the first block or two. The emperor's casket was attended by "only three carriages," with no mourners on foot, and there were "about thirty people" at the burial service in the Masonic Cemetery.

In 1934, Norton's remains were transferred to a grave site at Woodlawn Memorial Park Cemetery in Colma, California.

== Legacy ==
"San Francisco lived off the Emperor Norton," claimed his biographer William Drury, "not Norton off San Francisco."

=== In popular culture ===
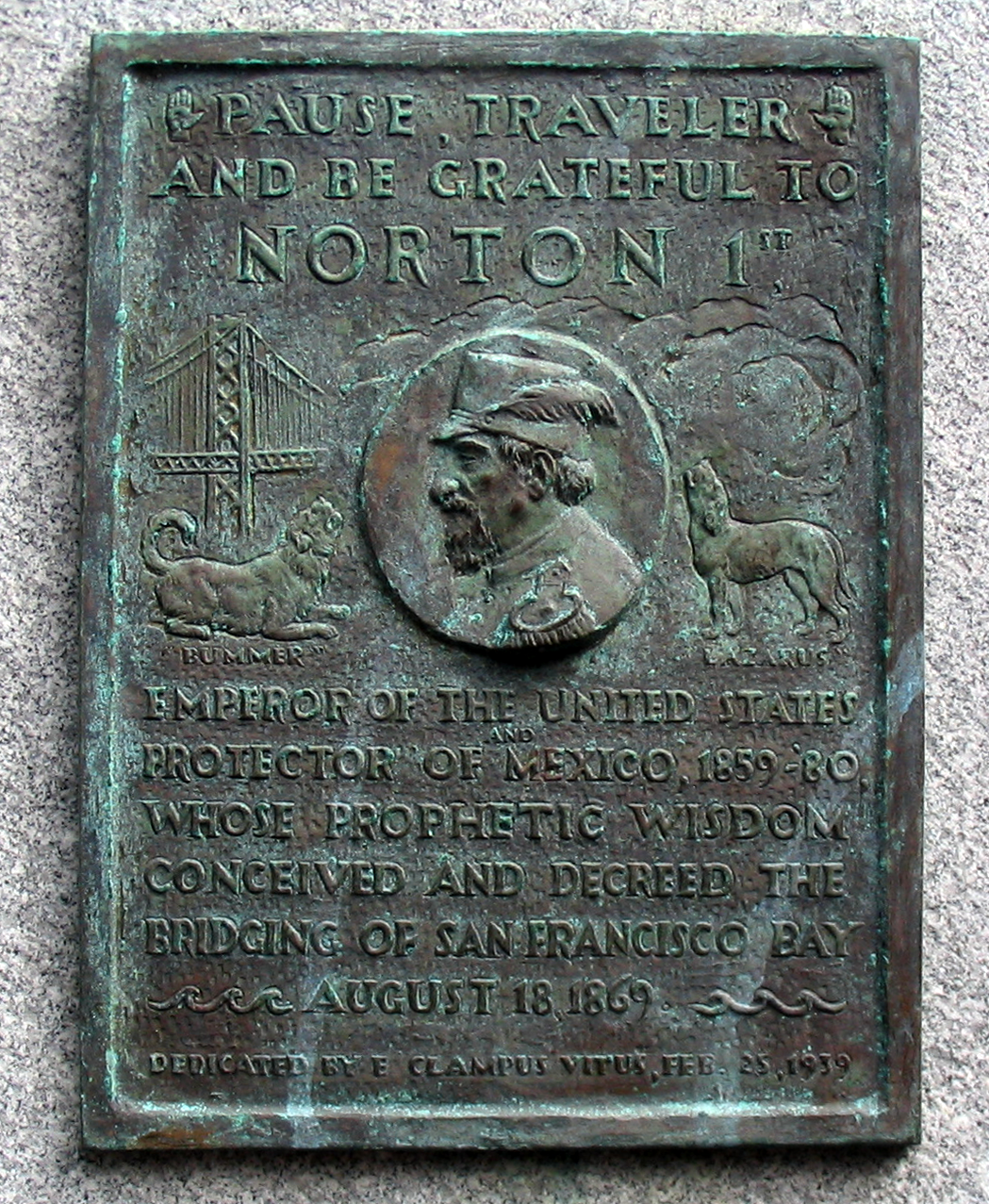
This 1939 plaque commemorating Norton's role in the history of the Bay Bridge was originally at the Cliff House, San Francisco and then at the now-demolished Transbay Terminal. It is currently located inside Old Molloy's Tavern, in Colma, Calif.

Mark Twain resided in San Francisco during part of Emperor Norton's public life, and modeled the character of the King in his 1884 novel Adventures of Huckleberry Finn on him. Robert Louis Stevenson made Norton a character in his 1892 novel, The Wrecker. Stevenson's stepdaughter Isobel Osbourne mentioned Norton in her 1937 autobiography This Life I've Loved, stating that he "was a gentle and kindly man, and fortunately found himself in the friendliest and most sentimental city in the world, the idea being 'let him be emperor if he wants to.' San Francisco played the game with him."

From 1953 through 1962 The San Francisco Chronicle conducted "the Emperor Norton Treasure Hunt ... burying a medallion and printing clues until it was found. The medallion could be turned in at The Chronicle’s headquarters for $1,000." People dug everywhere including large sections of parks and beaches.

There have been a number of television adaptations of the Norton story. In the June 15, 1956, episode of the western anthology series Death Valley Days, titled "Emperor Norton," Parker Garvie played the title character. In the February 27, 1966, episode of the western television series Bonanza, titled "The Emperor Norton," Sam Jaffe played the title role. The episode also featured William Challee as Sam Clemens a.k.a. Mark Twain. In the December 18, 1956, episode of Broken Arrow season 1, episode 11, titled "The Conspirators," Florenz Ames played the "Emperor Norton."

Joshua A. Norton as Emperor Norton also appears as a character alongside Mark Twain in the issue #31 "Three Septembers and a January" of the graphic novel series The Sandman by Neil Gaiman, where his delusion is caused by Morpheus, the King of Dreams and Nightmares. Norton has also been credited as the inspiration for "Emperor Smith", subject of the 22nd volume of Lucky Luke.

Since 1974, the Imperial Council of San Francisco has been conducting an annual pilgrimage to Norton's grave in Colma, California, just outside San Francisco. In January 1980, ceremonies were conducted in San Francisco to honor the 100th anniversary of the death of "the one and only Emperor of the United States."

A bar in the Tenderloin neighborhood of San Francisco is named Emperor Norton's Boozeland in honor of his legacy. Among its many art-deco style furnishings is an authentic promissory note issued by Emperor Norton and purchased by one of the bar's co-owners.

The Emperor Norton Trust — founded in 2013 as The Emperor's Bridge Campaign, based in San Francisco until 2019, and based in Boston and San Francisco since 2020 — is a nonprofit that engages in research, education, and advocacy to advance the legacy of Emperor Norton.

In the game Victoria 3 by Paradox Interactive, Norton is an in-game "Agitator" who can become leader of The United States.

Emperor Norton is considered a patron saint of Discordianism.

== Public tributes ==
There have been perennial efforts to name major public San Francisco landmarks after Emperor Norton or to enact other permanent local tributes to him.

=== "Emperor Norton Place" – Honorary naming of 600 block of Commercial Street ===
In February 2023, San Francisco Board of Supervisors president Aaron Peskin introduced a resolution to add "Emperor Norton Place" as a commemorative name for the 600 block of Commercial Street. The resolution was adopted by the Supervisors, and approved by Mayor London Breed in April 2023, with signage installed in early May.

=== San Francisco–Oakland Bay Bridge ===
In 1939, the fraternal group E Clampus Vitus commissioned and dedicated a plaque commemorating Emperor Norton's call for the construction of a suspension bridge between San Francisco and Oakland. The group intended to place the plaque on the recently opened San Francisco–Oakland Bay Bridge or, failing that, the new Transbay Terminal. However, that was not approved by the bridge authorities and the plaque was installed at the Cliff House in 1955. It was moved to the Transbay Terminal in 1986, in connection with the 50th anniversary of the bridge. The Terminal was closed and demolished in 2010 as part of the project to construct a new Salesforce Transit Center, and the plaque was placed in storage. After being restored in late 2018, it was rededicated and reinstalled at the new transit center in September 2019 but, after being vandalized in 2020, was moved to Molloy's Tavern in Colma, California, in 2021.

==== "Emperor Norton Bridge" proposals (2004–2022) ====
In November 2004, San Francisco District 3 Supervisor Aaron Peskin introduced a resolution to the San Francisco Board of Supervisors, after a campaign by San Francisco Chronicle cartoonist Phil Frank calling for the entire bridge to be named for Norton. On December 14, 2004, the Board approved a modified version of this resolution, calling for only "new additions," i.e., the planned replacement for the bridge's eastern section, to be named "The Emperor Norton Bridge." Neither the City of Oakland nor Alameda County passed any similar resolution, so the effort went no further.

In June 2013, eight members of the California Assembly, and two members of the California Senate, introduced a resolution to name the western section of the bridge after former California state Speaker and San Francisco Mayor Willie Brown. In response, there were public efforts seeking to revive the earlier Emperor Norton effort. An online petition launched in August 2013 called for the entire bridge system to be named after him. The petition was the impetus for the creation of The Emperor's Bridge Campaign, now known as The Emperor Norton Trust, which continued the bridge-naming effort until 2022, citing the precedent of 30 California bridges for which the state had authorized multiple names. The Trust called on the legislature simply to make "Emperor Norton Bridge" an honorary name for the Bay Bridge, leaving in place all existing names. Most recently, the organization hoped to sponsor a legislative resolution that would take effect in 2022, the 150th anniversary of Emperor Norton's proclamations of 1872, setting out the original vision for the bridge. The legislature did not take up the issue in 2022, and the Trust suspended its bridge-naming effort.

==== "Emperor Norton Tunnel" proposal (2025–present) ====
After successive efforts to build support for naming the San Francisco Ferry Building clock tower "Emperor Norton Tower" in 2023 (the 125th anniversary of the building) and in 2024 (the 175th anniversary of Joshua Norton's arrival in San Francisco), The Emperor Norton Trust returned to the Bay Bridge.

In August 2025, the Trust introduced a proposal that the California state legislature name the bridge's tunnel through Yerba Buena Island the "Emperor Norton Tunnel" in 2026 — the 90th anniversary of the bridge and the 180th anniversary of Emperor Norton's original arrival in the United States in 1846.

In August 2026, California State Senator Scott Wiener adopted and advanced this proposal as Senate Concurrent Resolution 193. The resolution was co-authored by Assemblymember Catherine Stefani. The Emperor Norton Trust was the citizen sponsor.

SCR 193 passed the Senate unanimously, 39–0. But, under Assembly rules that put up high bars to expediting any measure in the final two weeks of the session, SCR 193 received neither committee nor floor votes in the Assembly.

The Trust has announced its commitment to seeing this resolution reintroduced in the 2027–2028 legislative session, which opens in December 2026.

== See also ==
- Kinjirō Ashiwara
- Frederick Coombs
- Bummer and Lazarus
- José Sarria
- Frank Chu
- James Strang
