= Grace Hibbard =

American author (ca. 1835 - 1911)

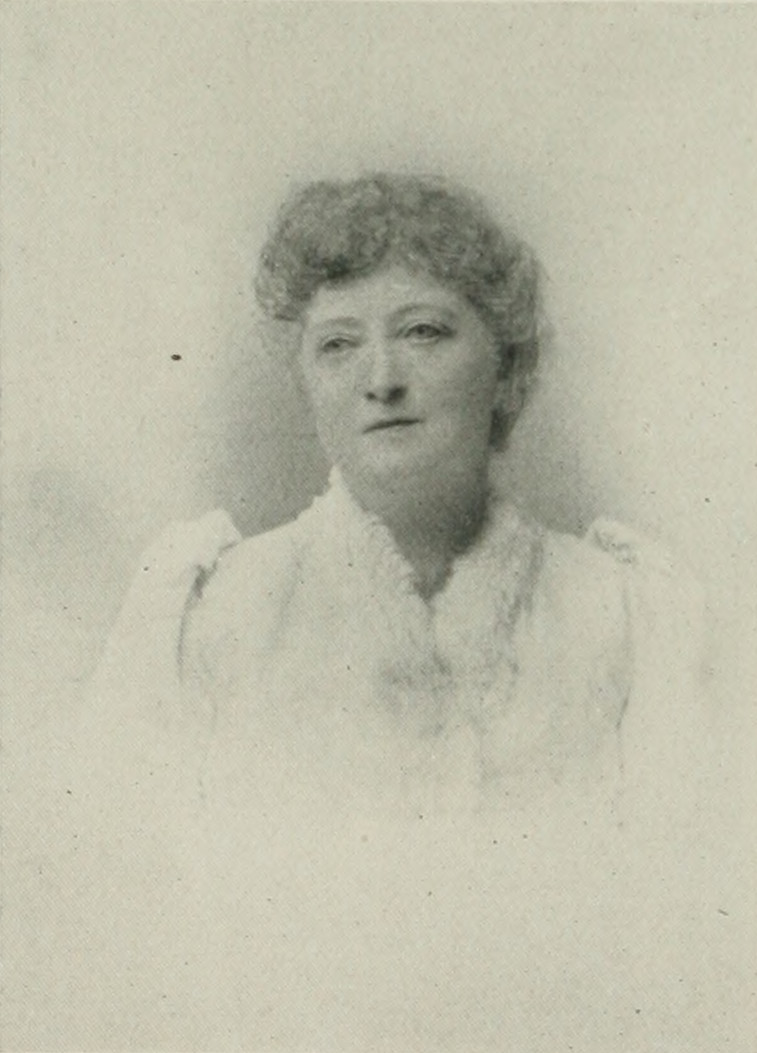
- Photo in A Woman of the Century
- Born: Helen Grace Porter ca. 1835 suburb of Boston, Massachusetts, U.S.
- Died: February 28, 1911 San Francisco, California, U.S.
- Occupation: author; poet
- Notable works: California Sunshine; California Violets; Wild Roses of California; "Bummer and Lazarus"
- Spouse: Lieutenant Edminster (d. ca. 1881); William W. Hibbard (married, 1888; divorced no later than 1893)
- Children: Porter Edminster

Grace Hibbard (née, Porter; also known as, Mrs. Major Edminster; ca. 1835 – February 28, 1911) was an American author and poet of the long nineteenth century. Hibbard had a large following among the women of California. Among her books were California Sunshine, California Violets, and Wild Roses of California. Some of her best-known poems included "The Engineer's Daughter" and "Waiting for Colin". Her short story, "Bummer and Lazarus", set in San Francisco, was translated into the German and printed in one of the leading papers published in the German language.

== Early life and education ==
Helen Grace Porter was born in a suburb of Boston, Massachusetts, ca. 1835, and there received her education. She was the daughter of Dr. Porter, a Massachusetts clergyman, and a descendant of an old English family. Her early life was spent in New England, where, from her father, when still a child, she learned the Hebrew and Greek alphabets long before she learned the English.

At an early age, she was graduated from a young women's college near Boston.

== Career ==
Soon after she graduated, her father removed to Chicago, where after a short time he died.

Her first literary work appeared in the Springfield, Massachusetts, Republican, and since then, she was a contributor to many of the leading magazines and papers of the U.S.

She was married when very young to Lieutenant Edminster, who died circa 1881.

After being a resident of Windsor, Vermont, Hibbard married Dr. William W. Hibbard, December 24, 1888, in Colorado Springs, Colorado. He was a leading physician of Denver, Colorado, and they made a home there. Her only child, a son, Porter Edminster (b. ca. 1869), also lived in Denver.

The second marriage was not happy and Hibbard secured a divorce in Denver before removing to San Francisco, no later than April 1893, when she was referred to as "Mrs. Major Edminster" in a newspaper story about her newly published book, Wild Poppies. The following month, on May 18, 1893, Porter died of pneumonia, at the age of 24.

Hibbard lived in San Francisco until the fire and then removed to Carmel-by-the-Sea, California. During these years, she made a number of trips to Mexico, where she studied the Mexican character, which she portrayed in her writings. In short stories and ballads, she excelled. One short sketch, "Bummer and Lazarus", a story of San Francisco, was translated into the German and printed in one of the leading papers published in the German language. She contributed to Belford's Magazine, The San Francisco Morning Call and other journals.

Hibbard never wrote verse until she came to California. Many of her verses were copied all through the U.S. For several years, she was a member of the literary colony at Pacific Grove, California, where she resided the last four years of her life. She was a member of the Pacific Coast Women's Press Association.

== Death ==
Hibbard died of heart disease, February 28, 1911, in San Francisco, 76 years of age.

== Selected works ==
=== Books ===
- Wild poppies, 1893
- California violets; a book of verse, 1902
- Wild roses of California, a book of verse, 1902
- An Easter song, 1903
- Forget-me-nots from California: A Book of Verse, 1907
- California sunshine, and other verses, 1911
- 'Neath Monterey pines, 19??
- A collection of wild flowers of California
- California poems of Grace Hibbard

=== Short stories ===
- "Bummer and Lazarus"

=== Song lyrics ===
- Hope
- A Kiss
- I Heard You Sing
- A white Chrysanthemum
- A Japanese Serenade
- The Red Rose
- Six Songs

=== Poems ===
- "The Engineer's Daughter"
- "Waiting for Colin"
