= Eléonore Vergeot =

French mistress of Napoleon III (1820–1886)

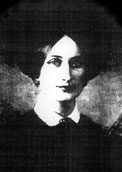
Eléonore Vergeot

Éléonore Alexandrine Vergeot (3 September 1820 – 4 August 1886) was a French domestic worker and mistress to Napoléon III, nicknamed "la belle sabotière" (the beautiful clog maker).

== Life ==
She was born in Estouilly to Marie-Louise Françoise Éléonore Camus and her husband Antoine Joseph Vergeot, who worked as a clog maker, then a prison guard and finally as a weaver. Louis-Napoléon Bonaparte's arrived at Ham Fort in 1840—he had been sentenced to life imprisonment after his second attempt to seize power. Initially she was a domestic servant in the home of Caroline O'Hara, nurse, mistress and later second wife of Louis-Napoléon's accomplice Charles-Tristan de Montholon, also imprisoned at the fort. On 25 May 1841 the Minister of the Interior authorised Vergeot to visit Louis-Napoléon and repair his linen. They soon became lovers, with the authorities deciding to turn a blind eye to the affair. They had two children, Eugène and Alexandre, born in 1843 and 1845 respectively in Paris.

Louis-Napoléon also completed Vergeot's education. She also met Pierre Bure on his several visits to Ham and in Paris whilst there to give birth to her children—he had been a foster brother of Louis-Napoléon and by this time was his business manager. When Louis-Napoléon escaped in 1846 she moved to Paris and became Bure's mistress instead, bearing him one child, Jean. At the start of the Second French Empire, Louis-Napoléon (now Napoleon III) made Bure treasurer-general to the crown on an annual salary of 30,000 francs and a knight (later officer) of the Légion d'honneur.

On 3 August 1858 Bure married Vergeot in Paris, legitimised Jean and adopted and legitimised her two children with Louis-Napoléon (all three children being stated in the paperwork to have been born to fathers unknown). Her contribution in their marriage contract was sizeable, suggesting Louis-Napoléon's generosity towards her. She died at Le Vésinet four years after Bure and is buried at the cimetière Montmartre.

== Bibliography (in French) ==
- Tulard, Jean (ed.), Dictionnaire du Second Empire, Paris, Fayard, 1995.
- Roger Régis, La belle sabotière et le prisonnier de Ham, 1937 (roman).
- Robert Lamouche, (in collaboration with Danièle Tourteau-Oualid), Eléonore Vergeot, pour l'amour d'un prince, Éd. la Vague verte, 2005.
- Eddy de Tassigny, Les Napoléonides, Editions Memodoc, 2012.
