= Alexandre Bure =

Illegitimate son of Napoleon III

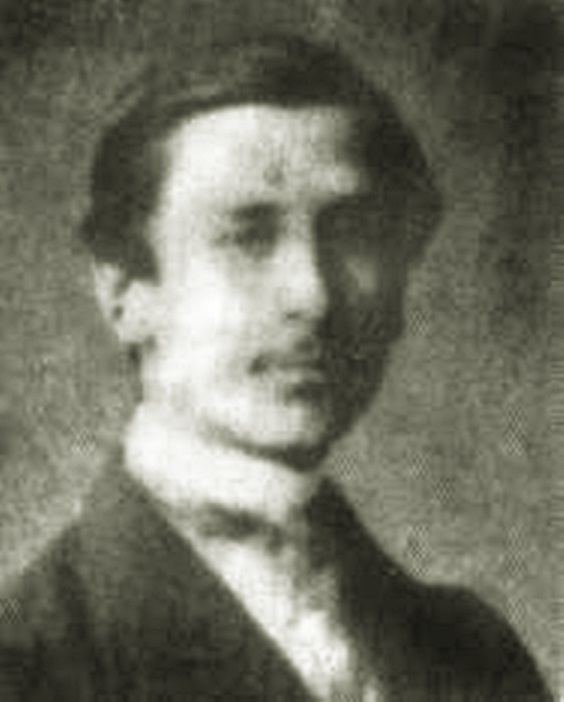

Alexandre Louis-Ernest Bure (18 March 1845 – 11 February 1882) was hereditary count of Labenne from 1870 until his death and receiver of finances. He also called himself Louis-Napoléon.

== Life ==
He and his elder brother Eugène were illegitimate sons of Napoleon III by Eléonore Vergeot, his servant and mistress whilst at Ham Fort. To avoid scandal she was sent away to have both babies and Alexandre was born in Batignolles-Monceau before being entrusted to Madame Cornu to bring up. Napoleon did not recognise the boys but did grant their mother an annual pension and charged his foster brother Pierre Bure with looking after them. Bure had a son, Jean Bure, with Vergeot in 1853, and five years later married her and adopted Eugène and Alexandre, who both studied at the Collège Sainte-Barbe in Paris. On 21 April 1865 Alexandre joined the secretariat of the treasurer general to the crown.

He took part in the second French intervention in Mexico, married a woman in Puebla (where he is said to have avoided being poisoned by his new mother-in-law), and finally left the army to settle in Mexico, where he did not thrive. He only got back to France late in 1869 and—with his birth father's help—was made receiver general of finances and in June 1870 count of Labenne (the last-ever Frenchman to be ennobled, with no other titles awarded after that date). However, the fall of the Second French Empire prevented him taking up the post of receiver general.

A few months after his second marriage the family moved to an 1860 house on rue Bécot, Paimpol, which they renamed the 'Villa Labenne'. He also headed that town's gendarmerie from 1880 to September 1884. He and Charles Tellier (Note: He invented refrigerated rooms on ships bringing meat from South America to Europe and a process using hot air to dry cod, the latter interesting the shipowner Le Goaster) tried to build a factory using Alexandre's second wife's fortune but they and Le Goaster gave up after opposition from some politicians and industrialists.

Alexandre became ill and moved back to Paris, dying at 69 rue de Miromesnil there. His widow took his body to Brittany for burial beside their son Georges at the Lancerf Chapel in Plourivo. The grandiose funeral ceremonies early in 1885 were attended by all the region's remaining Bonapartists but were derided by others as the 'retour des cendres' (by analogy with the return of Napoleon I's remains in 1840). Marie-Henriette relaunched the drying-building and factory alongside her second husband Louis Auguste Dupont, former intendant of the château de Villennes-sur-Seine, which Marie-Henriette had inherited from her father. However, the business was declared bankrupt in 1887, though its former drying-building on rue Labenne in Paimpol now houses the town's maritime museum.

== Marriage and issue ==
His first wife's name is unknown. On 12 March 1879 in Paris he married his second wife, Marie-Henriette Paradis (1857, Vaugirard – 1937, Avignon), rich heiress to banker Jean-Baptiste Paradis (died 23 April 1871). Philippe Wolmar (former central cashier of the Crown treasury) witnessed both that marriage and in 1858 that of Bure and Vergeot. Alexandre and Marie-Henriette had only one child, Georges Henri Louis Bure de Labenne (20 March 1880 – 10 December 1884).

== Sources (in French) ==
- Charles Nauroy, Les secrets des Bonaparte, p. 25-39, éd. Bouillon, 1889
- Charles-Maurice de Vaux, Les hommes d'épée, volume 1, Le compte de Labenne p. 57-59, éd. Rouveyre, 1882
- Léon Treich, Les alcôves de Napoléon III, éd. Les Deux Sirènes, 1948.
