= Bummer and Lazarus =

Two famous dogs in 19th-century San Francisco

Bummer
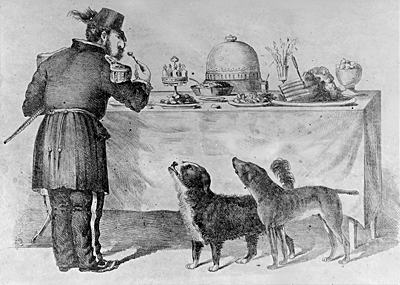
- The Three Bummers. Edward Jump's cartoon shows Bummer and Lazarus begging scraps from Emperor Norton.
- Species: Canis familiaris
- Breed: Newfoundland mix
- Sex: Male
- Died: Nov 1865; San Francisco
- Known for: ratter, bond with Lazarus
- Appearance: black and white coat

Lazarus
- Species: Canis familiaris
- Breed: Unspecified mix
- Sex: Male
- Died: Oct 1863; San Francisco
- Known for: ratter, bond with Bummer
- Named after: Lazarus of Bethany, miraculous recovery from severe injury

Bummer and Lazarus were two stray dogs that roamed the streets of San Francisco, California, in the early 1860s. Recognized for their unique bond and their prodigious rat-killing ability, they became a fixture of city newspapers, later exempted from local ordinances and immortalized in cartoons.

== Background ==
San Francisco, sharing in common with other cities in the United States at the time, had a major problem with free-ranging dogs. In Los Angeles in the 1840s, dogs outnumbered people by nearly two to one, and while the situation in San Francisco had not reached this extreme, the large numbers of strays and feral dogs did cause problems. Dogs were regularly poisoned or trapped and killed. Nevertheless, if a dog turned out to be an effective ratter or distinguished itself in another notable way, it was still possible for it to survive.

== Biography ==
=== Meeting and career ===
Bummer was a black-and-white Newfoundland (or Newfoundland cross) who established himself outside the saloon of Frederick Martin in 1860 and quickly proved to be an exceptional rat-killer. His ratting talent spared him the fate of the former owner of the territory, Bruno, who had been poisoned with strychnine shortly before Bummer's arrival. According to a 1901 retrospective published in the San Francisco Call, he had been owned by Ned Knight, a reporter for the Daily Alta California and had followed him to San Francisco from Petaluma. He scraped a living begging scraps from passers-by and the patrons of the saloon and other establishments along Montgomery Street.

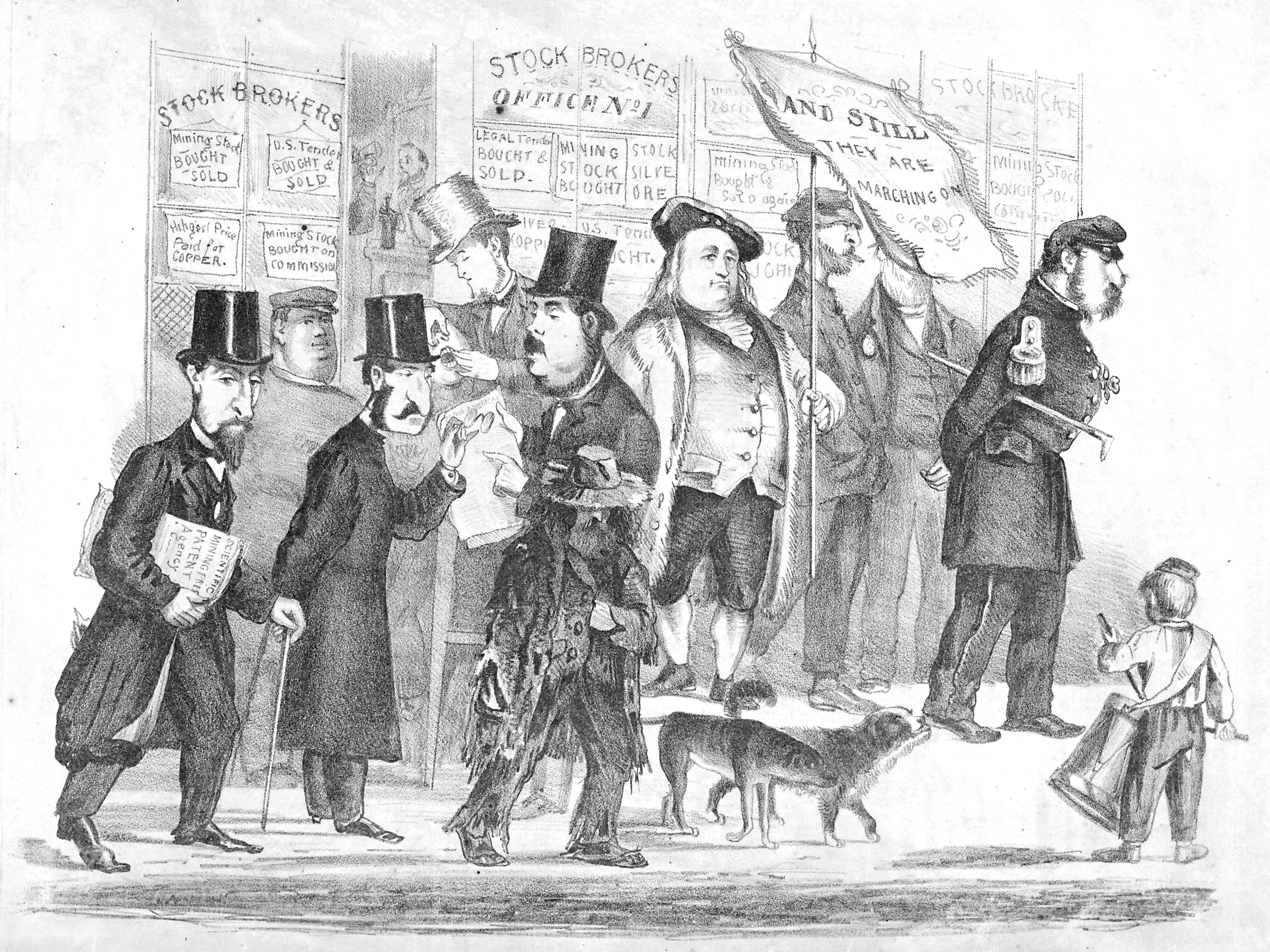
Ambling Down Montgomery Street. Joshua A. Norton, Bummer and Lazarus are accompanied by "George Washington II" another local eccentric.

In 1861, Bummer rescued another dog from a fight with a larger canine opponent. The rescued dog was badly injured, with a deep wound on his leg, and was not expected to live. Bummer coaxed him to eat, brought back scraps from his scavenging missions and huddled next to him to keep him warm during the night. The injured dog quickly recovered and within days was following Bummer as he made his begging rounds in the streets. His remarkable recovery earned him the name Lazarus, and he proved to be an even more prodigious ratter than Bummer. As a team they turned out to be exceptional, once finishing off 85 rats in 20 minutes.

Their ratting talent and unique bond was seized upon by the city's press. Martin's saloon was a favorite haunt of newspapermen and journalists, so, with the dogs a fixture outside the bar, they never had to travel far for a story. The exploits of the dogs were recorded in detail in the Californian, Daily Alta California, Daily Morning Call, and Daily Evening Bulletin, the editors vying with each other in their attempts to endow the pair's adventures with thrills and parallels to the human condition. Bummer was portrayed as the gentleman down on his luck, yet still faithful and conscientious, while Lazarus, the mongrel, was cast in the role of the sly and self-serving fair-weather friend. When Bummer was shot in the leg after only a couple of months, and Lazarus left him to run with another dog, it suited the press no end: Bummer was said to be feeling the sting of ingratitude at the desertion of the cur he had saved from death. Lazarus' return when Bummer recovered only added to the excitement.

The two dogs had the run of the streets, and when, on June 14, 1862, Lazarus was taken by a new dog catcher, a mob of angry citizens demanded his release, petitioning to have the pair declared city property so they could wander the streets unmolested. The city supervisors released Lazarus and declared he and Bummer were exempt from the city ordinance against strays. A week later the two were reported to have stopped a runaway horse. Despite their reputations, the two could be vicious: Bummer was a sheep killer and regularly fought other dogs in the street, occasionally assisted by Lazarus (although normally Lazarus would restrict himself to barking encouragement). They also ransacked shops when they had entered unnoticed and had been locked in by the owners.

=== Emperor Norton ===
The two dogs were sometimes seen in the company of the "Emperor of the United States", the eccentric Joshua A. Norton, and a popular legend made him their owner. However, no contemporary records make any mention of Norton being the owner and only one newspaper report made any connection between him and the dogs. The rumor may have arisen because the cartoonist Edward Jump frequently featured the three together, most notably in The Three Bummers which showed Norton eating from a heavily laden buffet table while the dogs wait patiently for scraps. Norton was apparently outraged when he saw the picture displayed in a shop-front window: the imperial dignity was affronted by the depiction of His Majesty in the company of lowly dogs. Despite the apparent antipathy felt by Norton for the dogs, the close association was still being claimed in the 1950s:

Bummer and Lazarus went everywhere with him. No theatrical performance opened in San Francisco from 1855 to 1880 that three complimentary tickets for the first row of the balcony were not put aside for Bummer and Lazarus and Norton I, Emperor of the United States.

— Samuel Dickson - San Francisco is My Home

=== Death of Lazarus ===
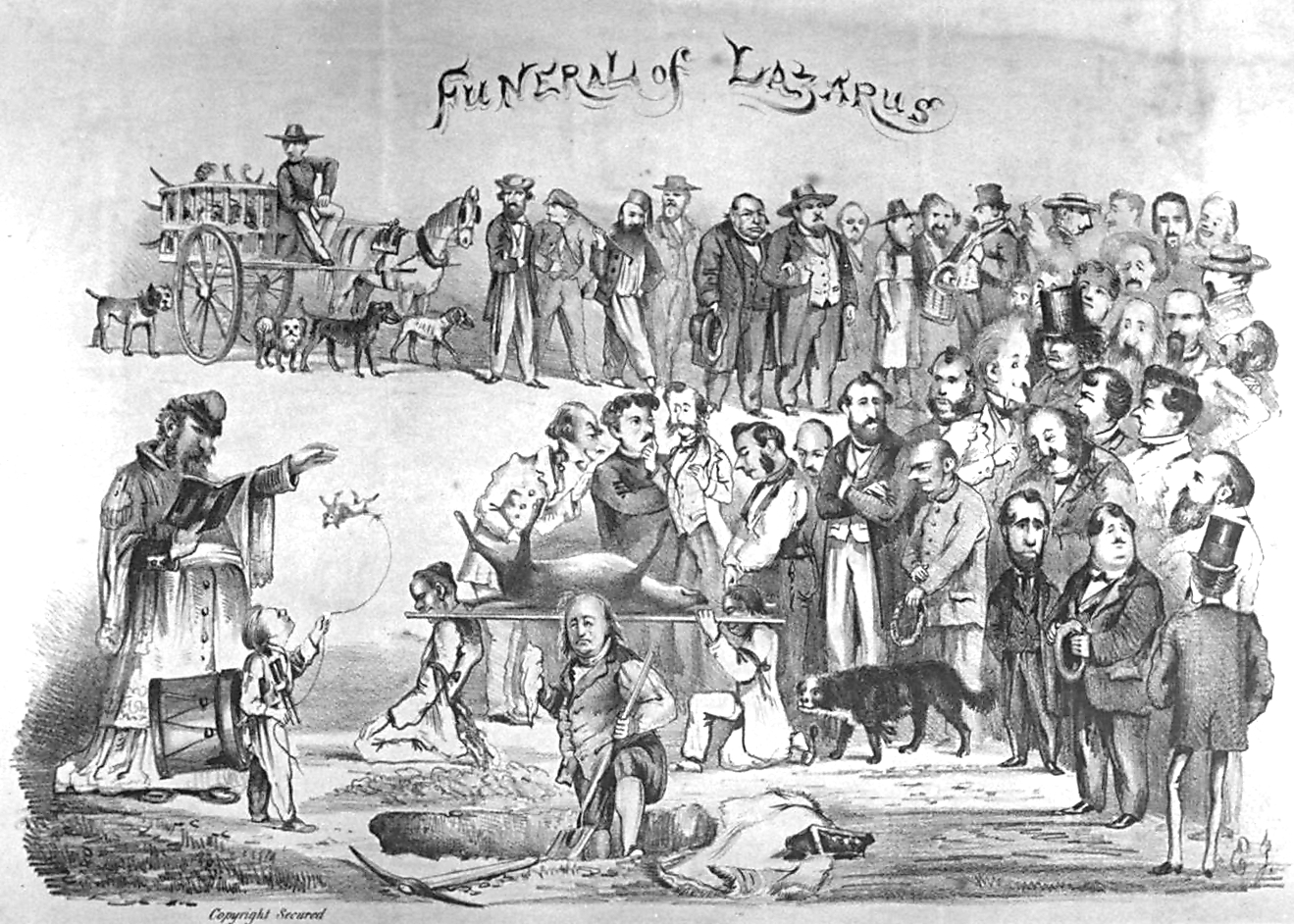
Lazarus' funeral as depicted by Jump. At the rear of the cortege is the dogcatcher in his cart. "Emperor" Norton presides over the service.

Lazarus was killed in October 1863. In San Francisco Kaleidoscope, Samuel Dickson claimed he was kicked by the horse of one of the city's fire engines, but contemporary accounts say he was poisoned by being given meat laced with "ratbane" after biting a boy. San Franciscans put up a $50 reward for the capture of the poisoner. A wit suggested that Lazarus be buried in a place of honor alongside other great men of the city. Jump produced a cartoon of his "Funeral" with Norton as the Pope performing the ceremony and Freddy Coombs—another San Francisco eccentric who claimed to be the reincarnation of George Washington—digging the grave. Notable San Franciscans formed the cortège and Bummer looked on mournfully. This may have led to the rumor that large numbers of San Franciscans turned out for Lazarus' funeral. The dog was not buried though, but stuffed by a taxidermist and displayed behind the bar in Martin's saloon. (According to Dickson, Martin paid the taxidermist $50 to turn the dog over—even though its remains had already been claimed by the city council.) The Daily Evening Bulletin featured a long obituary entitled "Lament for Lazarus" in which they praised the virtues of both dogs and recounted their various adventures together.

=== Death of Bummer ===
Bummer continued alone, although Mark Twain reported a year later in the Daily Morning Call that he had taken a small black puppy under his wing. Nothing more was heard of the puppy and without his companion, Lazarus, Bummer was of less interest to the press. He died a lingering death in November 1865 after being kicked by a drunk, Henry Rippey. Bummer was still popular enough that, to avoid violence, the city immediately arrested Rippey. He also did not escape popular justice: on learning of his crime, his cellmate, David Popley, "popped him in the smeller".

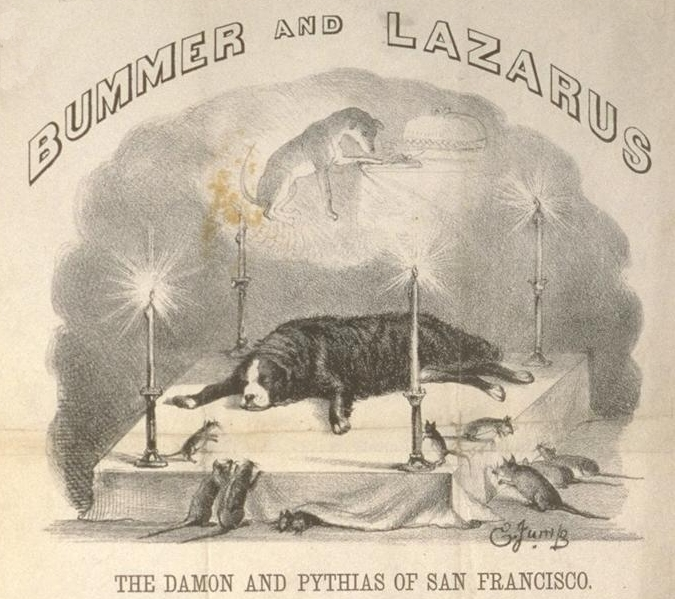
Bummer lies in state. This cartoon of Jump's was accompanied by a long satirical eulogy.

Bummer's passing did not make the headlines in the same way that Lazarus' death had, but Jump created a new cartoon showing him lying in state while Lazarus tucked into a table of food in the ether above him and rats paid their respects. Mark Twain produced a eulogy for him in the Virginia City Enterprise which was reprinted in the Californian on 11 November 1865:

The old vagrant 'Bummer' is really dead at last; and although he was always more respected than his obsequious vassal, the dog 'Lazarus,' his exit has not made half as much stir in the newspaper world as signalised the departure of the latter. I think it is because he died a natural death: died with friends around him to smooth his pillow and wipe the death-damps from his brow, and receive his last words of love and resignation; because he died full of years, and honor, and disease, and fleas. He was permitted to die a natural death, as I have said, but poor Lazarus 'died with his boots on' - which is to say, he lost his life by violence; he gave up the ghost mysteriously, at dead of night, with none to cheer his last moments or soothe his dying pains. So the murdered dog was canonized in the newspapers, his shortcomings excused and his virtues heralded to the world; but his superior, parting with his life in the fullness of time, and in the due course of nature, sinks as quietly as might the mangiest cur among us. Well, let him go. In earlier days he was courted and caressed; but latterly he has lost his comeliness - his dignity had given place to a want of self-respect, which allowed him to practice mean deceptions to regain for a moment that sympathy and notice which had become necessary to his very existence, and it was evident to all that the dog had had his day; his great popularity was gone forever. In fact, Bummer should have died sooner: there was a time when his death would have left a lasting legacy of fame to his name. Now, however, he will be forgotten in a few days. Bummer's skin is to be stuffed and placed with that of Lazarus.

— Mark Twain

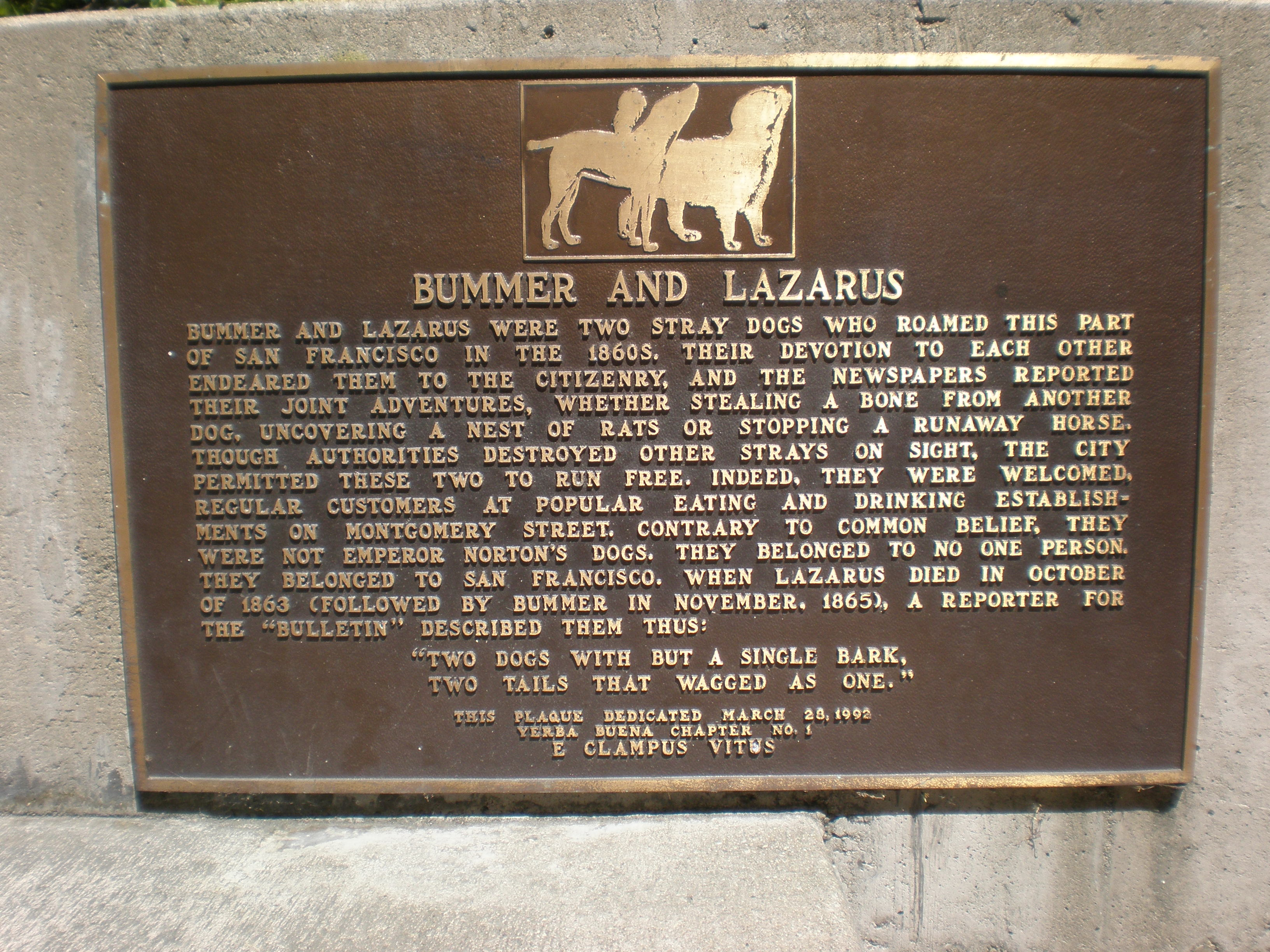
Bummer and Lazarus plaque (1992)

Bummer was also mounted by the taxidermist and placed on display.

== Preservation and tribute ==
In 1906, the Bummer and Lazarus taxidermies were donated to the Golden Gate Park Museum (now the M. H. de Young Memorial Museum). Contemporaneous newspaper reports place the dogs at the Museum as late as June 1917. Records of the Fine Arts Museums of San Francisco, the institutional parent of the de Young, include undated notations that the specimens were "Destroyed." But these records do not indicate a date, or a reason why, this happened.

On 28 March 1992, E Clampus Vitus placed a brass plaque commemorating the two dogs at Transamerica Redwood Park, a small park adjacent to the base of the Transamerica Pyramid.

== See also ==
- List of individual dogs
