= Eugène Bure =

Illegitimate son of Napoleon III

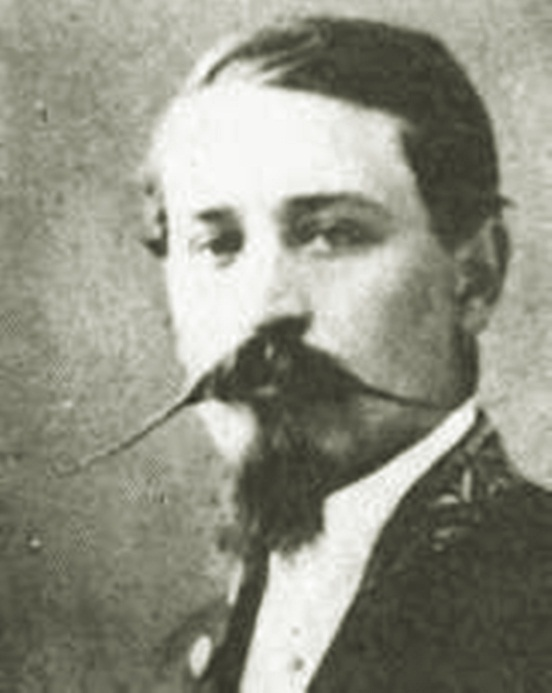

Alexandre Louis Eugène Bure (25 February 1843 – 14 February 1910) was an illegitimate son of Napoleon III by Eléonore Vergeot. After a career in the consulate corps, he was made hereditary count of Orx in Landes in 1870.

== Life ==
He was conceived during his birth father's captivity at Ham Fort and—to avoid scandal—his mother was sent to give birth to him secretly in Paris. He was then entrusted to Madame Cornu to bring up. His birth father did not recognise his existence or that of his full younger brother Alexandre, though he did assign a pension to their mother and charged his foster brother Pierre Bure with looking out for them. Bure later adopted the two boys when he married Vergeot in 1858—he had also had a child, Jean Bure, with her in 1853.

Eugène did well at school before entering the diplomatic service as secretary to France's ambassador in Saint Petersburg, where he scandalously kidnapped an actress who was the French ambassador's mistress. He was therefore moved to different far-off posts within the consular corps, being attached to the consulate general in New York on 2 July 1861 and moved to being a supernumerary in the direction des fonds on 12 October 1864.

He then became vice-consular agent in Roses, Catalonia, Spain on 28 June 1865 and vice-consular agent in Belfast on 17 February the following year. Whilst in Belfast he witnessed the rise of the Fenians. Next he became France's consul general in or to the Sultanate of Zanzibar, then Danzig and then Charleston, South Carolina.

In June 1870 he was made count of Orx by decree of his birth father. The associated estate in Landes was mainly made up of former marshland which had been being reclaimed since 1843. In 1850 (whilst president rather than emperor) Napoleon III had previously granted its concession to M. Lefêvre-Béziers, aiming to reclaim 1,200 hectares of cultivatable land by cutting 110 kilometres of canals (including the Boudigau canal), gullies and ditches. Lefêvre-Béziers had then ceded his rights in it to count Walewski in 1858, who continued the works, which Napoleon III frequently visited from neighbouring Biarritz.

On 2 July 1870 he was made consul general in Asunción in Paraguay, but never took up the post as he instead joined the army for the Franco-Prussian War. He got on badly with his birth father and often asked him for more money, despite already having a yearly pension of 6,000 francs. After the fall of the Empire he left the civil service and lived for a time at the château 'de Beauregard' in Castets, again in Landes.

In 1885 he became mayor of Saint-André-de-Seignanx, a post he held until his death in that town in 1910. He was also counsellor-general for the former canton of Saint-Martin-de-Seignanx. He was buried in the town cemetery at Saint-André-de-Seignanx.

== Marriage and issue ==
On 19 June 1877, he married Jeanne Alphonsine-Pauline Joséphine Homel Le Carlier (1856–1942) at Saint-André-de-Seignanx. They had four children:

- Fernand Eugène Jean Bure, comte d'Orx (1878–1948);
- Amélie Jeanne Bure d'Orx (1880–1972);
- Antoine Bure d'Orx (born and died on 18 November 1883);
- Antoinette Jeanne Marie Bure d'Orx (1887–1975).
