= Tokyo Metropolitan Matsuzawa Hospital =

Coordinates: 35°39′59″N 139°37′12″E

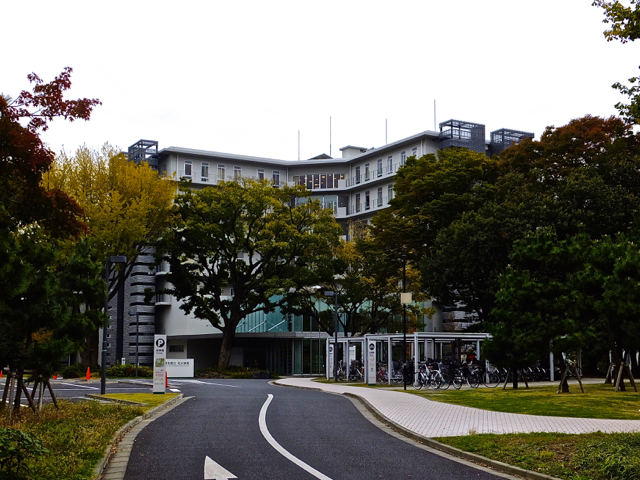
- Front entrance of the Tokyo Prefectural Hospital in 2015

Geography
- Location: 2-1-1, Kamikitazawa, Setagaya-ku, Tokyo, Japan

Services
- Beds: 1,264

History
- Former names: Tokyo Metropolitan Psychiatric Asylum (東京府癲狂院, 1879–1889); Tokyo Prefecture Sugamo Hospital (東京府巣鴨病院, 1889–1919); Tokyo Prefecture Matsuzawa hospital (東京府松沢病院, 1919–1943)
- Opened: 1879

Links
- Website: www.tmhp.jp/matsuzawa/
- Lists: Hospitals in Japan

Tokyo Metropolitan Matsuzawa hospital (東京都立松沢病院, Tōkyō toritsu Matsuzawa byōin) is a public, 1,264-bed psychiatric hospital in Setagaya, Tokyo, Japan. It was founded in 1879. It is a hospital established and operated by the Tokyo Metropolitan Government, and is a general hospital equipped with other clinical departments as well as a psychiatric hospital.

Its address is 2–1–1, Kamikitazawa, Setagaya-ku, Tokyo. It is one of the largest centres for psychiatric care in Japan.

== History ==
Founded as the Tokyo Metropolitan Psychiatric Asylum in Ueno Park in July 1879, the institution relocated several times before moving to its current location in Setagaya in November 1919.

Renamed to Sugamo Hospital in Tokyo in 1889.

In 1901, Shuzo Kure, the chief professor of the Department of Psychopathology at the Tokyo Imperial University, and serving as the director of Sugamo Hospital, and begins hospital reform. The major reforms include:

1. Use of restraints is prohibited. Incinerate them all.
  - Currently, physical restraints are used when it is unavoidable .
2. Liberalization of outdoor exercise for patients, liberalization of exercise on the premises of hospitals accompanied by nursing staff and family members.
3. We will replace leader-level staff such as the chief nurse who has a traditional view of nursing, and renew the staff and awareness of nursing staff.
4. The new chief nurse will attend a nursing practice course at the Medical University Hospital to improve nursing skills.
5. Improvement of patient treatment and renewal of treatment policy.
6. Active use of occupational therapy.
7. Execution of extension and renovation of the ward.

The hospital got the current name with the start of the metropolitan system in July 1943.

The Main Clinical Building was completed in May 2012.

During the COVID-19 pandemic, Matsuzawa Hospital accepted many COVID-19 patients with mental illnesses. By March 2021, seven hospital staff had become infected with the virus.

== Description ==
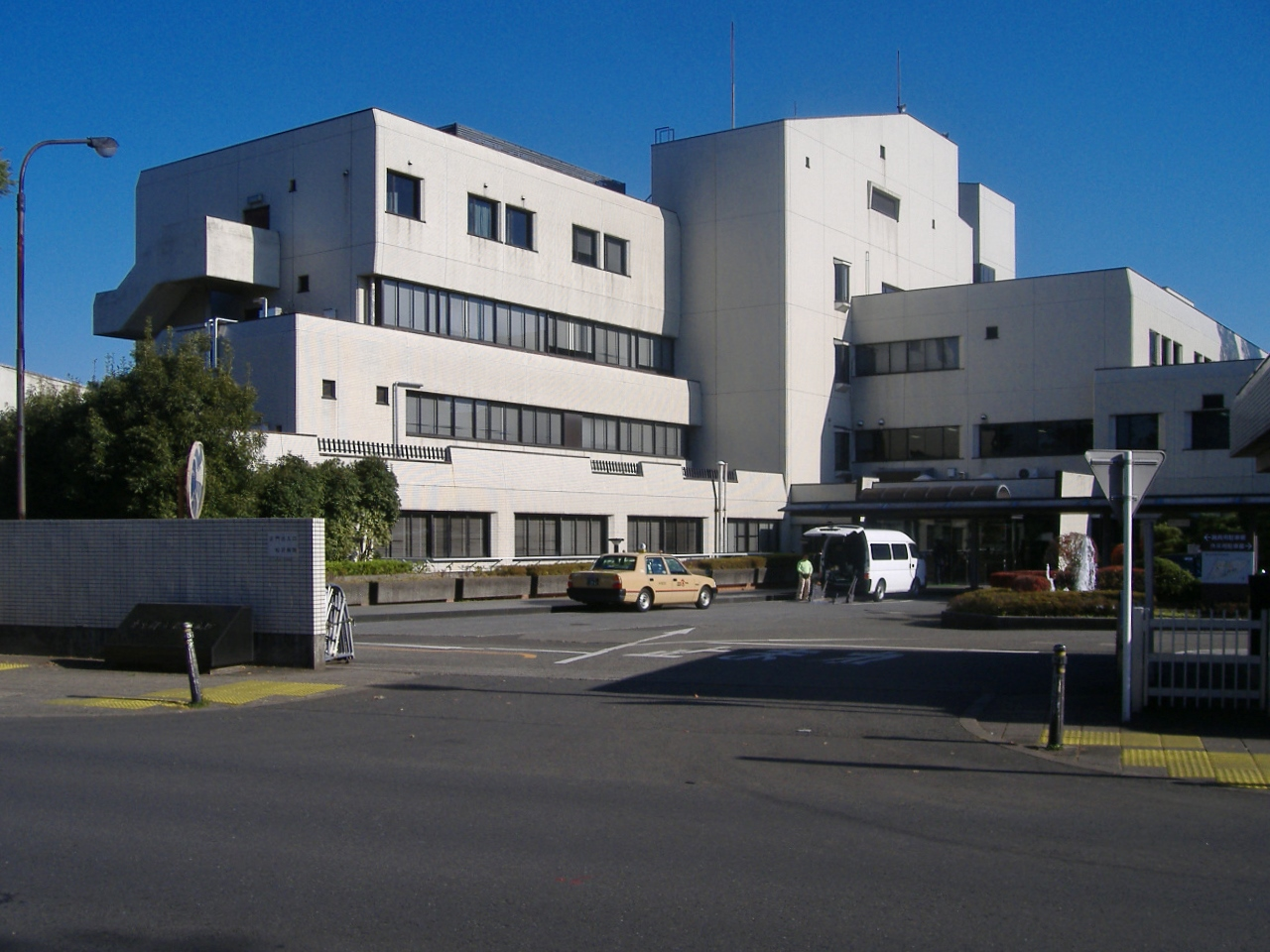
Tokyo Prefectural Matsuzawa Hospital, December 2009

Matsuzawa Hospital is a public facility under the jurisdiction of the Tokyo Metropolitan Government.

As of 2023, it is a designated hospital for psychiatric emergency hospitalization in Tokyo and as a Tokyo disaster base hospital. As a general rule the hospital will provide medical treatment to anyone who is 15 years old or older. For patients who are 14 years old or younger they will be taken to the Tokyo Metropolitan Children's Medical Center.

== Transport ==
The hospital is within walking distance of Hachimanyama Station on the Keiō Line.

== Notable patients ==
- Kinjirō Ashiwara – admitted in 1882, having been diagnosed with hereditary mania. The psychiatrists who later evaluated him, however, disagreed on the diagnosis of his condition; opinions were largely divided between paranoid schizophrenia and chronic mania.
