= Kinjirō Ashiwara =

Japanese self-proclaimed emperor (1850–1937)

- 葦原 金次郎
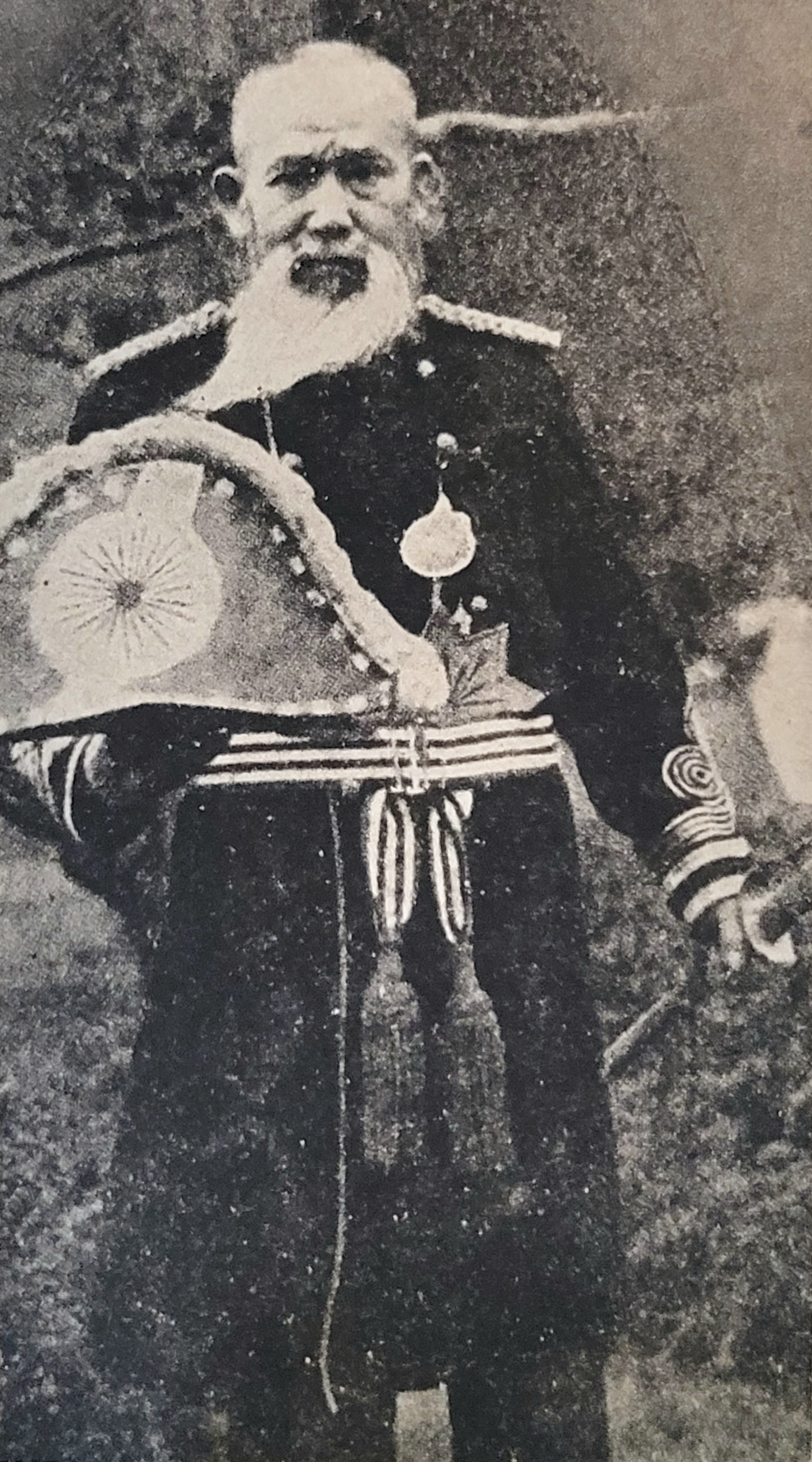
- Ashiwara in his court dress (大礼服姿), which became his signature clothing starting with the end of the Meiji era
- Born: November 3, 1850; Takaoka, Etchū Province, Japan
- Died: February 2, 1937 (aged 86); Tokyo, Empire of Japan
- Known for: Grandiose delusions

Japanese name
- Kanji: 葦原 金次郎
- Kana: あしわら きんじろう
Transcriptions
- Romanization: Ashiwara Kinjirō

Signature
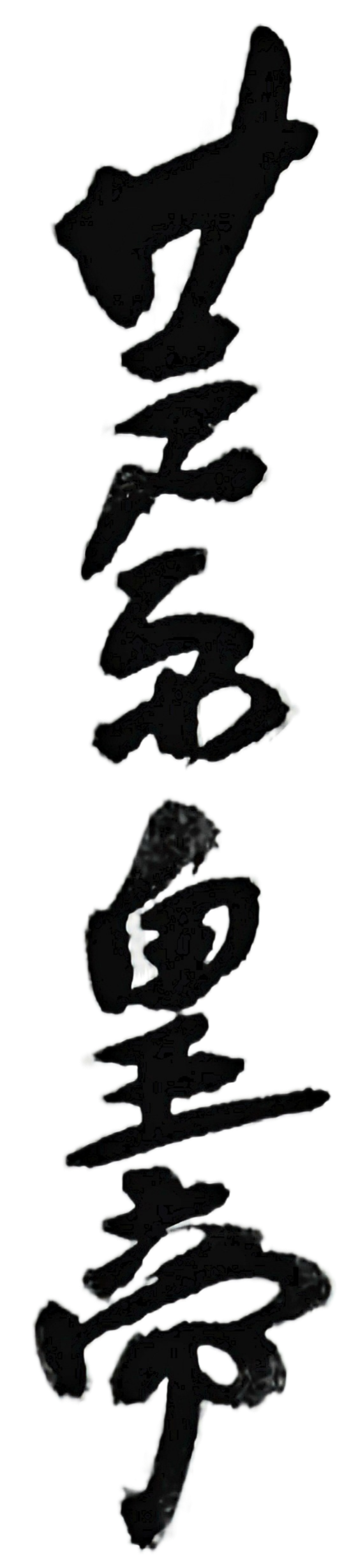

Kinjirō Ashiwara (Japanese: 葦原 金次郎, Hepburn: Ashiwara Kinjirō, IPA: [a̠ɕiɰᵝa̠ɾa̠ kʲĩɴʑiɾoː]; November 3, 1850 (Note: Dictionary of Clinical Psychiatry (臨床精神医学辞典, Rinshō seishin igaku jiten; 1985) states that he was born in 1852.) – February 2, 1937) was a self-proclaimed "emperor" of Japan who rose to a celebrity status with his grandiose delusions and theatrical antics that were covered by the Japanese press for decades, beginning in the Meiji era. He styled himself first as Shogun Ashiwara (葦原将軍, Ashiwara Shōgun), then later as Emperor Ashiwara (葦原皇帝, Ashiwara Kōtei; or 葦原天皇, Ashiwara Tennō) and Sovereign Ashiwara (葦原帝, Ashiwara Mikado).

After disrupting Emperor Meiji's procession and attempting to approach him, Ashiwara was involuntarily hospitalized in the Tokyo Metropolitan Psychiatric Asylum (present-day Tokyo Metropolitan Matsuzawa Hospital) in 1882 and, despite a few escapes and re-detainments, remained there until his death in 1937.

== Early life and marriage ==
Ashiwara was born in Takaoka, Etchū Province (present-day Takaoka, Toyama) as the third son of a samurai of Takaoka clan. As a young adult, Ashiwara worked for a comb wholesaler in Fukaya, Saitama Prefecture. According to a Yomiuri Shimbun report, he worked as a confectioner.

He experienced a nervous breakdown around the time he moved to Tokyo at the age of 20. He was married at the age of 24 but his wife "ran away"; they divorced later. He began calling himself "Shogun Ashiwara" around 1875 as his mental condition seemingly deteriorated.

== Initial newspaper reports ==
The earliest extant mention of Ashiwara in the Japanese media occurred on June 1, 1880, in an article titled "Famous Man Shogun Ashiwara: Huge Scene at the Ministry of the Treasury (名物男葦原将軍/大蔵省で大気焰)" on Tokyo Eiri Shimbun, a minor daily newspaper of the Meiji era. According to the article, he caused a public disturbance with his "usual" angry outbursts at the Ministry of the Treasury and was taken to the police station.

On June 12, Tokyo Jiyu Shimbun reported that Ashiwara had come into a telegraph bureau office in Tokyo and declared that he was "Shogun Ashiwara, Senior Third-Rank Imperial Appointee and First-Class Minister of the Left" (Note: "正三位勅任官勲一等左大臣蘆原将軍". Imperial Appointee (勅任官) or Chokuninkan was a class of officials appointed by a decree of the emperor; it was created in 1869 and abolished in 1949.) and that he needed to send an urgent telegram to Li Hongzhang, a well-known diplomat of the Qing dynasty in China, over "a matter of great concern". The alarmed office staff called the police.

== Hospitalization ==
In July 1881, Ashiwara disrupted a procession of Emperor Meiji, who was on a tour of the Tōhoku region, and attempted to approach him. Ashiwara was arrested and admitted to the Tokyo Metropolitan Psychiatric Asylum (present-day Tokyo Metropolitan Matsuzawa Hospital) in 1882, having been diagnosed with hereditary mania. The psychiatrists who later evaluated him, however, disagreed on the diagnosis of his condition; opinions were largely divided between paranoid schizophrenia and chronic mania. Dictionary of Clinical Psychiatry noted that, although delusional, he did not exhibit a personality breakdown attributable to dementia.

Ashiwara escaped from the hospital three times—in 1885, 1892, and 1904—but was re-detained each time. From May 7 to June 20, 1903, the Yomiuri Shimbun, one of the country's major newspapers, serialized an article titled "Mankind's Greatest Dark World: Psychiatric Hospital (人類の最大暗黒界瘋癲病院)", in which the living conditions and treatments of patients at the hospital (then-named Sugamo Prefectural Hospital) were described in detail. It included an entry on Ashiwara:

Since his hospitalization, [Ashiwara] has become famous as a madman. [...] he thinks of the hospital as his own domain, and walks about arrogantly and brazenly, blabbing big lies out of his mouth about how the emperor of France has come to see him, or how he had a sumo match with the president of the United States. [...] but what I detest is that he scolds other patients and forcibly takes their tableware and utensils away from them.

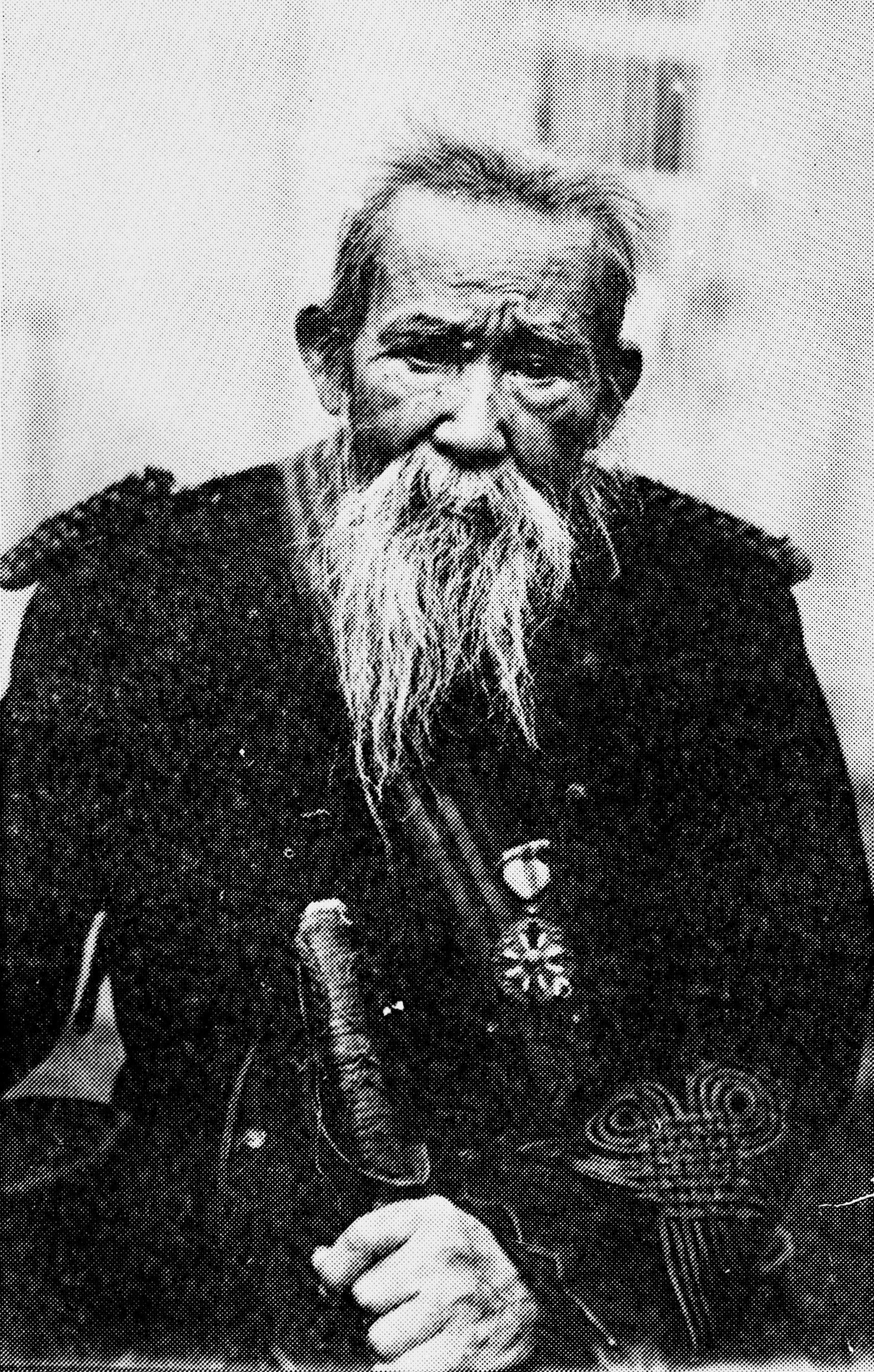
Ashiwara in his later years, photographed in Tokyo Prefecture Matsuzawa Hospital where he remained until his death in 1937

His grandiose delusions allegedly worsened after he learned of Japan's victory in the Russo-Japanese War in 1905. He started to grow a long white beard and wear a court dress which he somehow had obtained from an unknown source. During the Taishō era (1912–1926), he held press conferences at the hospital whenever there was political turbulence. Newspaper reporters would visit Ashiwara when they ran out of news material. Being a celebrity whose comments on controversial topics of the world politics and the current affairs—such as occasions of lèse-majesté or alleged tyranny of the military—were delusional, yet uninhibited and often amusing, he was an easy source of news stories for them. Some of the reporters even asked Count Nogi Maresuke and Prime Minister Itō Hirobumi to have a meeting with Ashiwara, much to their chagrin.

Soon after the Shōwa era began in 1926, Ashiwara started to call himself "emperor" and sold papers with his chokugo (Imperial edict) written on them to visitors. He remained in the hospital until his death in 1937. The vice president of the Matsuzawa Hospital performed an autopsy on Ashiwara's body and stated that he observed no pathological findings in Ashiwara's brain.

== See also ==
- Emperor Norton – Self-proclaimed Emperor of the United States (1818–1880)
- Li Guangchang – Self-proclaimed Emperor of China (fl. 1980–1986)
