= Edward Jump =

French-American artist

Edward Jump (1831?-1883) was a French-American artist popular for his drawings and sketches in the United States during the mid-19th Century.

== Biography ==
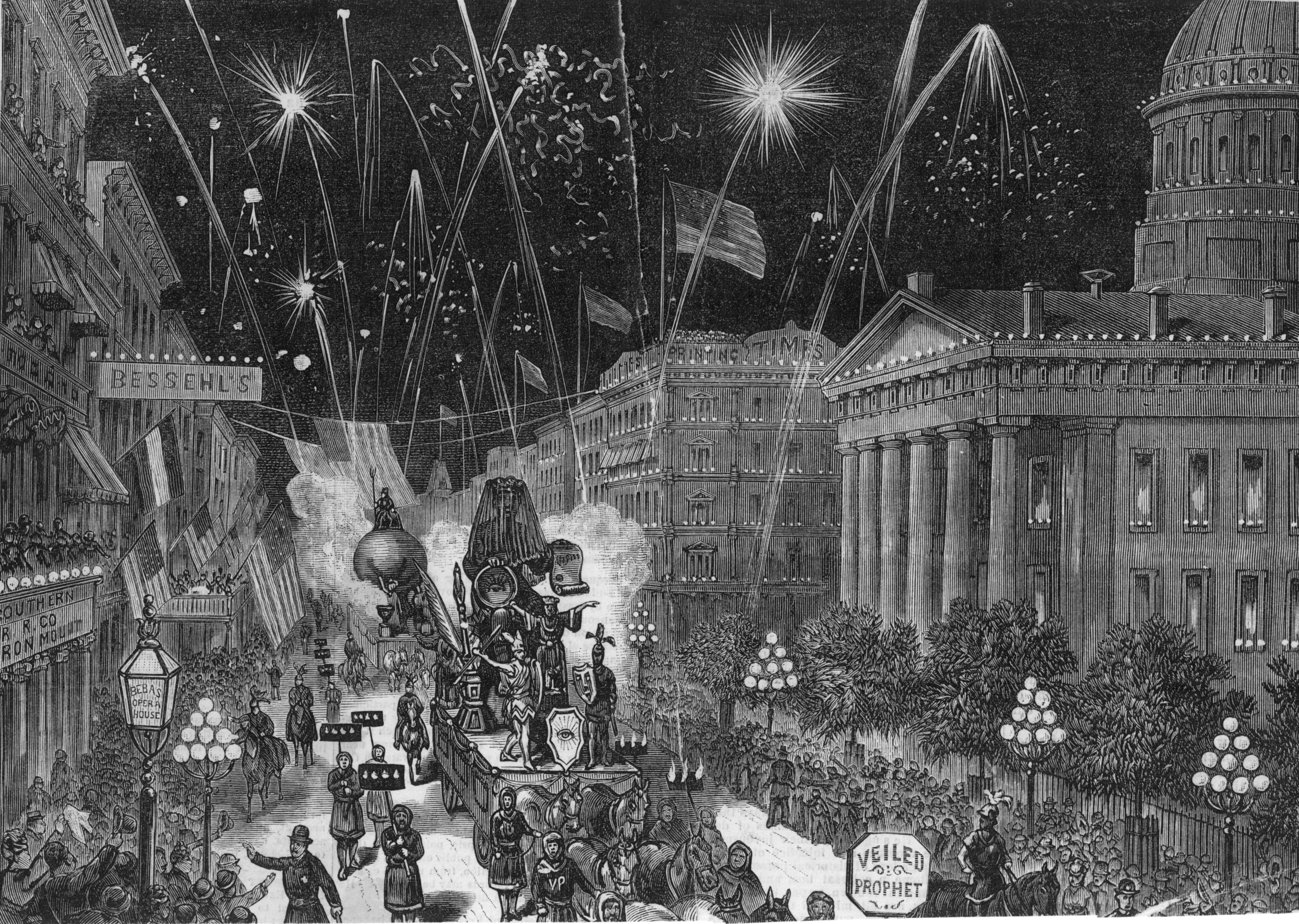
St. Louis's first Veiled Prophet Parade, drawn by Jump, 1878. The Old Courthouse (St. Louis), is at the right.

Jump was born in Paris, France, around 1831. His early life is not well documented, but he emigrated to California in 1852, attracted to the United States by the California Gold Rush. He traveled in the Western United States, returned to Paris for a short time and then back to the U.S.

While living in California, Jump, who was both a talented painter and cartoonist, made a living drawing commercial signs, painting portraits, and producing humorous cartoons of political figures for various publications. He worked in many places around the state, but mostly in San Francisco; there he created labels for whiskey bottles, and caricatures of contemporary figures. The 1860 census listed him as a "portrait painter."

In 1864 he was living in the Montgomery Block, San Francisco.

Jump remained active in San Francisco until October 1865, when an earthquake occurred. After moving to Washington, DC, in 1868, Jump became somewhat renowned for his artistic merits as a portrait painter. It was there that he met and married a French performer from a touring opera company. By the 1870s, Jump and his wife had moved to New York City, where he worked as a comic illustrator. Later in the decade, Jump attempted to start an illustrated newspaper in Montreal. Following the failure of this venture, Jump moved frequently, first to New Orleans, then to Cincinnati and St Louis.

In 1875 and 1878 he lived in St. Louis, Missouri.

In 1878, while working on sketches of the New Orleans Mardi Gras for the Frank Leslie's Weekly, Jump was arrested on a charge of carrying a concealed weapon when a pistol fell from his pocket and discharged. He pleaded guilty and a judge sentenced him to ten minutes in the parish prison.

Jump was living in St. Louis in 1878 and assigned to make sketches for Frank Leslie's Weekly of the first Veiled Prophet Parade and Ball when he was hurt badly by two hoodlums who took a wallet, a ring, and sketches of the ball. Nevertheless, Jump was able to finish his drawing of the parade (above), and it was published in the Weekly.

Finally, in 1880, Jump and his wife settled in Chicago, where he was just able to make a living by producing circus and theatrical posters. He was living in Chicago in 1882.

== Reputation ==
When Jump lived in San Francisco, California, in the 1860s, he was reputed to be the city's "favorite cartoonist." He roomed with Samuel Clemens, who wrote under the name Mark Twain. Michael G. Mattis of the Sacramento Bee wrote that Jump "had an eye for accurate detail, even when his aim was burlesque. One of the pleasures his audiences got from his drawings was that in crowd scenes it was always possible to recognize the faces of scores of notable San Franciscans."

Fellow artist Frank Bellew recalled that Jump once said of his career:

. . . one has to turn one's hand to everything. I draw caricatures for the bar-rooms, and do these big posters for the theaters, and make sketches for private individuals, and so on.

The Chicago Tribune said that Jump:

despite his dissolute habits, was possessed of no mean talent in his particular line. He never attempted much in the way of oil paintings of any very fine work, because he was too restless and nervous and lacked application. As a caricaturist, however, he was a wonderful success. Specimens of his work in this line are to be found in a thousand different places and in a score of large cities . . . .

A dispatch from St. Louis, Missouri, said that Jump:

was known as an eccentric character, but a fellow of some talent, and very apt at cartoons. Free and easy specimens of his work adorn the walls of several leading saloons and sporting headquarters. . . . Through his paintings[,] he was as well known as any man in the city.

== Death ==
On April 21, 1883, Jump committed suicide by shooting himself in the head with a pistol, driven to depression by the state of his marriage, financial issues, and alcoholism. He died the next morning.

An article reporting Jump's death appeared in the Chicago Daily Tribune, on the day of his death. The article described how Jump wrote two final letters, one addressed to his wife, and another to a lodge in St. Louis, where he was a member.

The letter to his wife read as follows:

...My dear wife: I have to go – keep calling here for letters; there will be a good one for you from England. I am too excited to write. God bless you. Your husband, E. Jump.

The other read:

20 April 1883. -- Gentlemen: I belong to the Lodge of Knights of Honor, No. 100 Oak Lodge, St. Louis, Mo. If I am disfigured don't let my poor wife see me. She is nervous, and it might kill her. I want to be buried by brothers. Edward Jump.

Jump's funeral took place two days after his death, and he was buried at Rosehill Cemetery, Chicago. He was survived by his wife and daughter.

== Family ==
The woman with whom he was living in 1860 was named Rose Jump. He married Emily C. Rogers of Ireland on January 21, 1868, in the District of Columbia. She had been a prima donna with Napoleon's Italian opera company in Italy.

They had a daughter, born 1865.

Emily C. Jump was committed to a New York asylum 1in 1885 as a "helpless inebriate."

== Gallery ==
Sketch from Their Excellencies' Reception

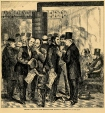
Sketches at the Capital-The Smoking Room, House of Commons

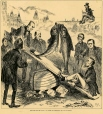
Sketches from the Capital-A Game of See-Saw

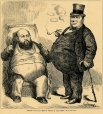
Sketches at the Capital. Men of Weight in Parliament
