= Château de Ham =

Castle in Somme, Hauts-de-France, France

- Hauts-de-France, France
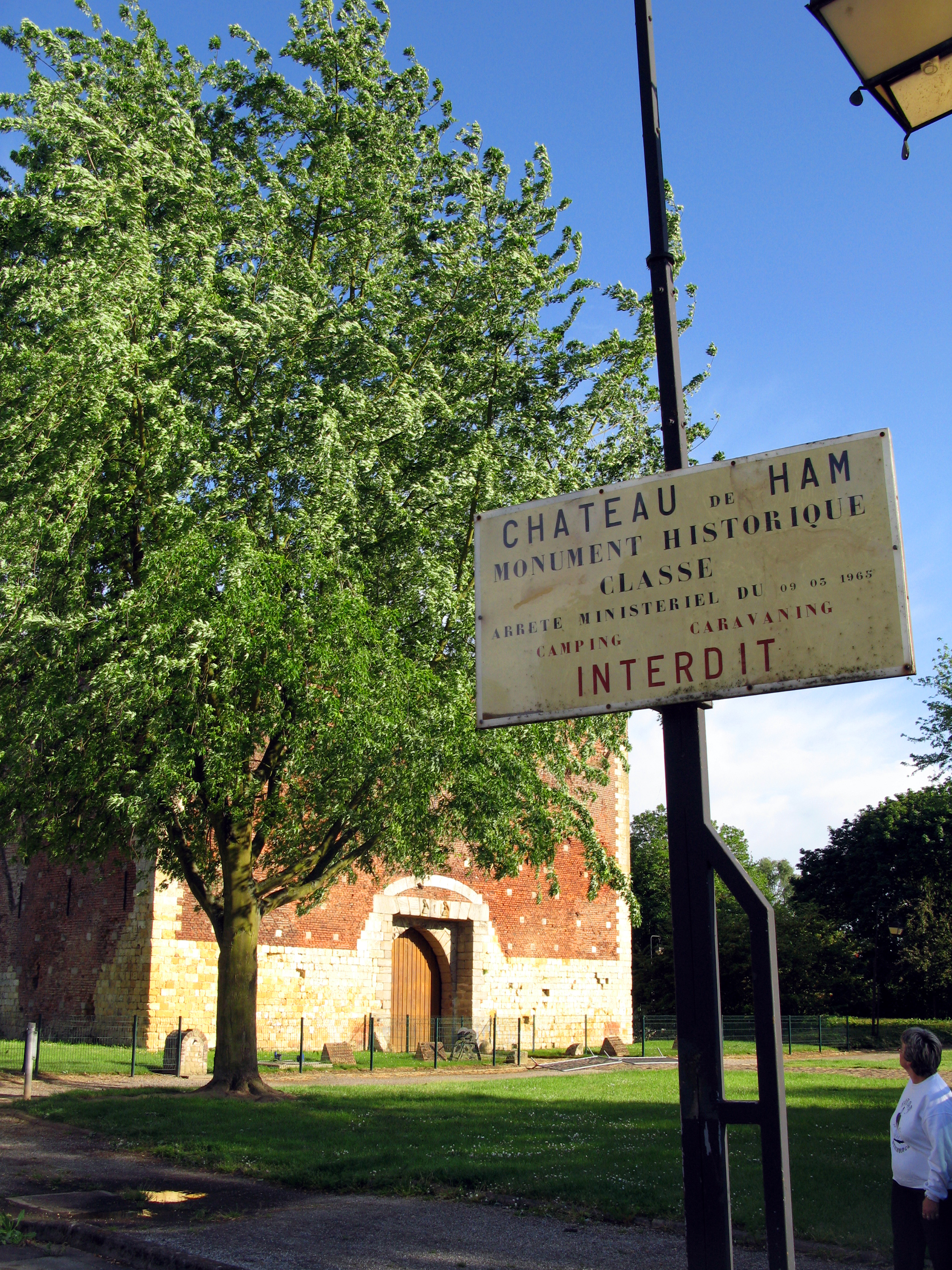

Site information
- Type: Castle

Location
- Château de Ham location in France
- Coordinates: 49.7434°N 3.0731°E

Site history
- Built: unknown (First mentioned in 1052)

The Château de Ham (also called fort or forteresse de Ham) is a castle in the commune of Ham in the Somme département in Hauts-de-France, France.

== History ==
The early castle, whose construction date is unknown, is mentioned in a 1052 charter. During the 13th century, it was restored by Odon IV of Ham who gave the fortress its definitive shape, a polygonal enceinte broken up by large cylindrical towers. Enguerrand de Coucy bought the seigneury in 1380 and his daughter sold it in 1400 to Louis d' Orléans, who integrated it into his network of fortresses which included La Ferté-Milon, Pierrefonds and Fère-en-Tardenois. Louis began the reconstruction, perfected after 1418 by John II of Luxembourg, Count of Ligny, who acquired the seigneury following Louis' assassination. John's nephew, Louis de Luxembourg, Count of Saint-Pol and constable to Louis XI in 1465, constructed a monumental keep in 1441. This massive tower (the tour du connétable - constable's tower) was 33 m (~108 ft) in diameter and 33 m (~108 ft) high and had walls 11 m (~36 ft) thick.

The Château de Ham was besieged several times, notably by Philip II of Spain in 1557.

United with the French crown under the reign of Henri IV, it was transformed at the end of the 17th century by Vauban.

The castle was later turned into a state prison. It 'welcomed' many famous prisoners, the last of whom was Prince Louis-Napoléon Bonaparte (the future Napoléon III) who, after six years, escaped by adopting the identity of a painter, Badinguet. Later, his opponents would often refer to him disparagingly as Badinguet

In 1870, during the Franco-Prussian War, the Second Army of the North encircled the town of Ham and forced the occupying Prussians to sign a surrender.

Like the Château de Coucy, the fort was dynamited on 19 March 1917, by the Germans. All that remains today is the square plan entrance tower and parts of its network of enceintes. These picturesque ruins dominate the peaceful course of the Canal de la Somme.

The castle has been listed since 1965 as a monument historique by the French Ministry of Culture.

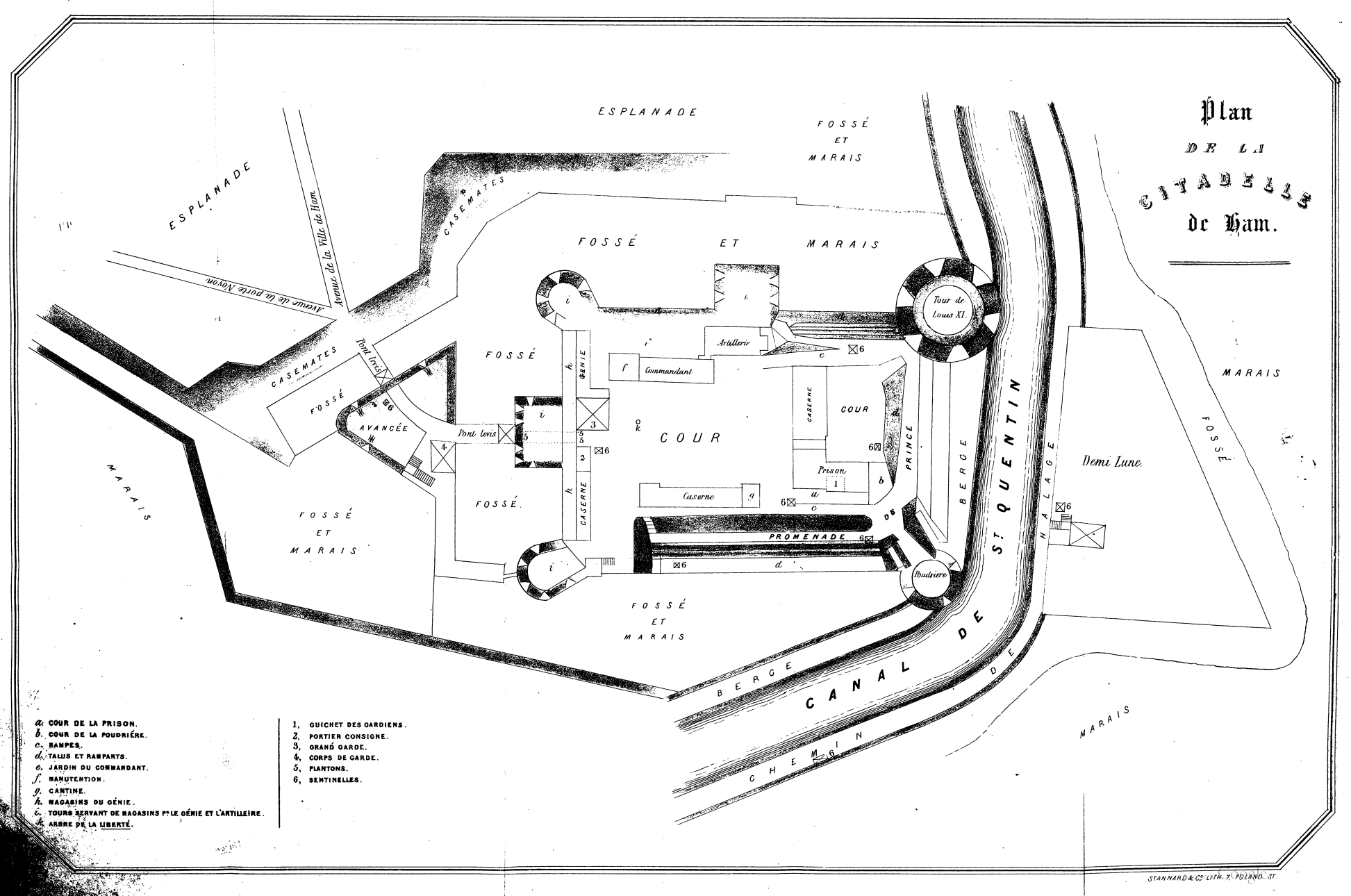
Plan of the Citadelle de Ham

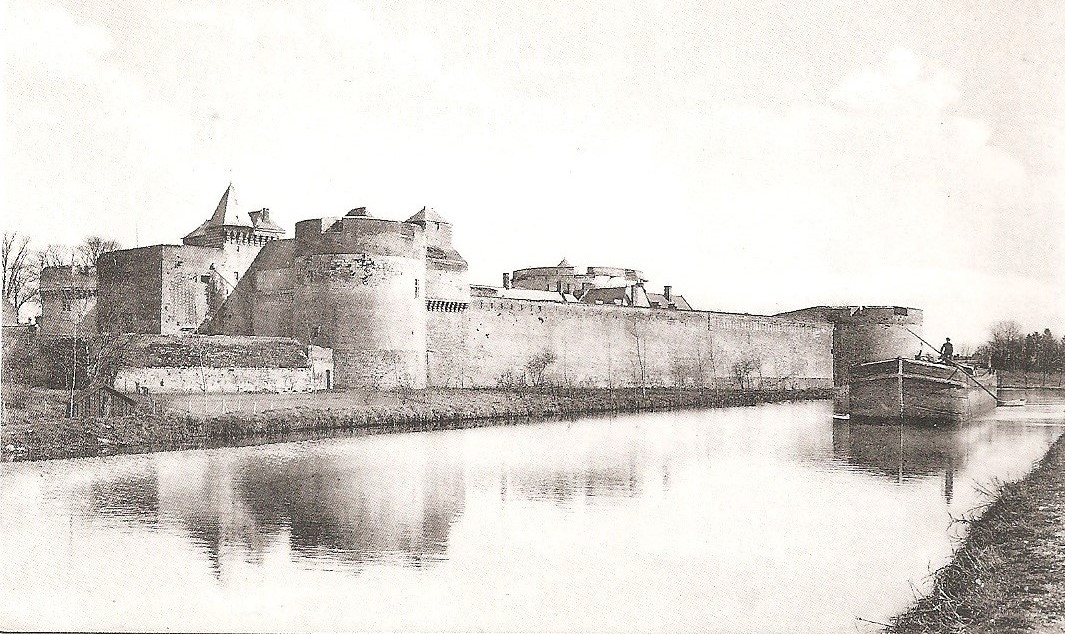
An old Postcard

== Notable prisoners held at Ham ==
- Jacques Cassard, French pirate
- Mirabeau
- Marshal Moncey
- Martial de Guernon-Ranville and Jean de Chantelauze, ministers of Charles X (1831–1836)
- Louis-Napoléon Bonaparte, future Napoléon III
- Louis I de Bourbon, prince de Condé

== See also ==
- List of castles in France
- House of Ham in French Wikipedia
