= Banknotes of the Japanese yen =

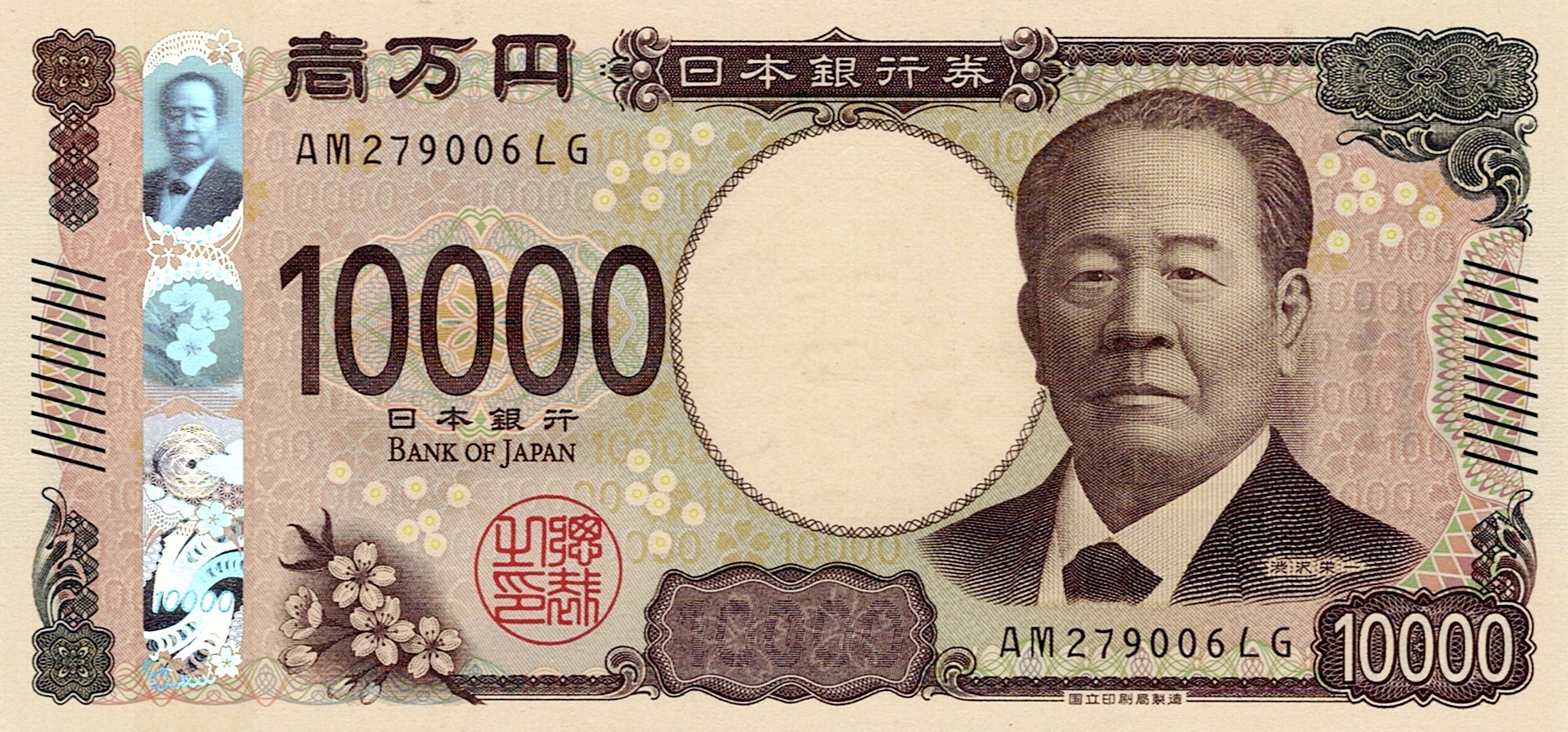
A series F 10,000 yen note, featuring the portrait of Shibusawa Eiichi

Banknotes of the Japanese yen, known in Japan as Bank of Japan notes (Japanese: 日本銀行券, Hepburn: Nihon Ginkō-ken/Nippon Ginkō-ken), are the banknotes of Japan, denominated in Japanese yen (¥). These are all released by a centralized bank which was established in 1882, known as the Bank of Japan. The first notes to be printed were released between 1885 and 1887 in denominations of 1 to 100 yen. Throughout their history, the denominations have ranged from 0.05 yen (aka 5 sen) to 10,000 yen. Banknotes under 1 yen were abolished in 1953, and those under 500 yen were discontinued by 1984. Higher end notes of 1000 yen and more made their appearance in the 1950s. These continue to be issued to the present in ¥1000, ¥2000, ¥5000, and ¥10,000 denominations. The formerly used notes of 1 to 500 yen from 1946 to the 1980s, while discontinued, continue to be valid. These are, however, worth more than their face value on the collector's market.

At present, Japanese banknotes are printed with portraits of people from the Meiji period and later. This is because it is desirable to use an accurate photograph as the original for a portrait, rather than a painting, in order to prevent counterfeiting.

== Meiji era ==
=== 1885–1887 ===
Daikokuten (1885–87)
Image		Value	Dimensions	Description (Note: Every note except for "5 yen" features a silver obligation in both English and Kanji on both sides.)		Date of		
Obverse	Reverse	Value	Dimensions	Obverse	Reverse	Issue	Issue suspension	Expiration
		¥1	78 × 135 mm	Daikokuten	Face value	September 8, 1885	October 1, 1958	Valid
		¥5	87 × 152 mm	Silver obligation and face value	Daikokuten	January 4, 1886	—N/a	March 31, 1939
		¥10	93 × 156 mm	Daikokuten	Face value	May 9, 1887	—N/a	March 31, 1945
		¥100	116 × 186 mm	Daikokuten	Face value	September 8, 1887	—N/a	March 31, 1945

=== 1888–1891 ===
Remodeled convertible banknotes (1888–91)
Image		Value	Dimensions	Description		Date of		
Obverse	Reverse	Value	Dimensions	Obverse	Reverse	Issue	Issue suspension	Expiration
—N/a	—N/a	¥1	85 X 145 mm	Takenouchi no Sukune	Silver obligation (English (Note: Every note features a silver obligation in both English and Kanji on both sides.))	May 1, 1889	October 1, 1958	Valid
		¥5	95 X 159 mm	Sugawara no Michizane	Silver obligation (English)	December 3, 1888	—N/a	March 31, 1939
		¥10	100 X 169 mm	Wake no Kiyomaro	Silver obligation (English)	September 12, 1890	—N/a	March 31, 1925
		¥100	130 X 210 mm	Fujiwara no Kamatari	Silver obligation (English)	November 15, 1891	—N/a	March 31, 1945

=== 1899–1900 ===
Convertible Banknote A (1899–1900)
Image		Value	Dimensions	Description (Note: Every note features a gold obligation in both English and Kanji on both sides.)		Date of		
Obverse	Reverse	Value	Dimensions	Obverse	Reverse	Issue	Issue suspension	Expiration
		¥5	85 X 146 mm	Takenouchi no Sukune and Ube Shrine	Gold obligation (English)	April 1, 1899	—N/a	March 31, 1939
		¥10	96 X 159 mm	Wake no Kiyomaro and Goō Shrine	Wild Boar design with gold obligation (English)	October 1, 1899	—N/a	March 31, 1939
		¥100	130 X 210 mm	Fujiwara no Kamatari and Tanzan Shrine	Gold obligation (English)	1900	1913	March 31, 1939

=== 1910 ===
Convertible Banknote B (1910)
Image		Value	Dimensions	Description		Date of		
Obverse	Reverse	Value	Dimensions	Obverse	Reverse	Issue	Issue suspension	Expiration
		¥5	78 X 136 mm	Sugawara no Michizane with gold obligation (Kanji)	Kitano Tenmangū shrine with gold obligation (English)	September 1, 1910	—N/a	March 31, 1939

== Taishō era ==
=== 1915–1917 ===
Taishō convertible banknotes (1915–17)
Image		Value	Dimensions	Description (Note: Every Taishō convertible banknote features a silver and gold obligation in both English and Kanji on both sides.)		Date of		
Obverse	Reverse	Value	Dimensions	Obverse	Reverse	Issue	Issue suspension	Expiration
		¥1	85 X 145 mm	Takenouchi no Sukune	Silver obligation (English)	August 15, 1916	October 1, 1958	Valid
	—N/a	¥5	73 X 130 mm	Takenouchi no Sukune and Ube shrine	Gold obligation (English)	December 15, 1916	February, 1927	March 31, 1939
		¥10	89 X 139 mm	Wake no Kiyomaro and Goō Shrine	Gold obligation (English)	May 1, 1915	—N/a	March 31, 1939
		¥20	86 X 149 mm	Sugawara no Michizane	Kitano Tenmangu shrine with gold obligation (English)	November 20, 1917	—N/a	March 31, 1939

== Shōwa era ==
=== 1943–1945 ===
First Issue (1943–45) (Note: The First issue series (い号券), is a collective term for notes issued after the Bank of Japan was re-organized in 1942.)
Image		Value	Dimensions	Description		Date of		
Obverse	Reverse	Value	Dimensions	Obverse	Reverse	Issue	Issue suspension	Expiration
		¥0.1	51 × 106 mm	Peace Tower	Ornamental	November 1, 1944	December 31, 1953	December 31, 1953
		¥1	81 mm x 142 mm	Takenouchi no Sukune	Ube Shrine	December 15, 1943	October 1, 1958	Valid
		¥5	76 mm x 132 mm	Sugawara no Michizane	Ornamental	December 25, 1943	March 9, 1946	March 9, 1946
		¥10	18 mm x 142 mm	Wake no Kiyomaro	Goō Shrine	1945	March 9, 1946	March 9, 1946
		¥100	93 mm x 162 mm	Prince Shotoku	Hōryū-ji	1945	March 9, 1946	March 9, 1946

=== 1946–1948 ===
Series A (1946–48)
Image		Value	Dimensions	Description		Date of		
Obverse	Reverse	Value	Dimensions	Obverse	Reverse	Issue	Issue suspension	Expiration
		¥0.05	94 × 48 mm	Prunus mume blossoms	Geometric patterns	May 25, 1948	December 31, 1953	June 30, 1954
		¥0.1	100 × 52 mm	Pigeons	The Diet building	September 5, 1947	December 31, 1953	June 30, 1954
		¥1	124 × 68 mm	Ninomiya Sontoku	Geometric patterns	March 19, 1946	October 1, 1958	Valid
		¥5	132 × 68 mm	Geometric patterns	Geometric patterns	March 5, 1946	April 1, 1955	Valid
		¥10	140 × 76 mm	The Diet building	Geometric patterns	February 25, 1946	April 1, 1955	Valid
		¥100	162 × 93 mm	Prince Shōtoku, "Yumedono" (A hall associated with Prince Shōtoku in Hōryū-ji Temple)	Hōryū-ji Temple	February 25, 1946	July 5, 1956	Valid
For table standards, see the banknote specification table.

=== 1950–1953 ===
Series B (1950–53)
Image		Value	Dimensions	Main Color	Description		Date of	
Obverse	Reverse	Value	Dimensions	Main Color	Obverse	Reverse	Issue	Issue suspension
		¥50	144 × 68 mm	Orange	Takahashi Korekiyo	Bank of Japan (HQ)	December 1, 1951	October 1, 1958
		¥100	148 × 76 mm	Brown-orange	Itagaki Taisuke	The Diet building	December 1, 1953	August 1, 1974
		¥500	156 × 76 mm	Dark blue	Iwakura Tomomi	Mount Fuji	April 2, 1951	January 4, 1971
		¥1000	164 × 76 mm	Grey	Prince Shōtoku	"Yumedono"	January 7, 1950	January 4, 1965
For table standards, see the banknote specification table.

Series B introduced a new high value banknote ¥1000.

=== 1957–1969 ===
Series C (1957–69)
Image		Value	Dimensions	Main Color	Description		Date of	
Obverse	Reverse	Value	Dimensions	Main Color	Obverse	Reverse	Issue	Issue suspension
		¥500	159 × 72 mm	Blue	Iwakura Tomomi	Mount Fuji	November 1, 1969	April 1, 1994
		¥1000	164 × 76 mm	Yellow-green	Itō Hirobumi	Bank of Japan (HQ)	November 1, 1963	January 4, 1986
		¥5000	169 × 80 mm	Green-brown	Prince Shōtoku	Bank of Japan (HQ)	October 1, 1957	January 4, 1986
		¥10,000	174 × 84 mm	Brown-green	Prince Shōtoku	A pillar painting of Hōō in Byōdō-in Temple	December 1, 1958	January 4, 1986
For table standards, see the banknote specification table.

The series C introduced two new high value banknotes ¥5000 and ¥10,000.

=== 1984 ===
The 1984 series started the printing process from 1982 to 1984.

Series D (1984)
Image		Value	Dimensions	Main Color	Description		Date of	
Obverse	Reverse	Value	Dimensions	Main Color	Obverse	Reverse	Issue	Issue suspension
		¥1000	150 × 76 mm	Blue	Natsume Sōseki	Pair of cranes	November 1, 1984	April 2, 2007
		¥5000	155 × 76 mm	Purple	Nitobe Inazō	Mount Fuji, Lake Motosu	November 1, 1984	April 2, 2007
		¥10,000	160 × 76 mm	Brown	Fukuzawa Yukichi	Pair of pheasants	November 1, 1984	April 2, 2007
For table standards, see the banknote specification table.

Due to the discovery of a large number of counterfeit Series D banknotes at the end of 2004, the issuance of new Series D banknotes except ¥2000 was virtually suspended on January 17, 2005, and officially suspended on April 2, 2007. According to a news release from the National Police Agency, they seized 11,717 counterfeit Series D banknotes (excluding the ¥2000 denomination) in 2005. However, they seized only 486 counterfeit current issue banknotes, namely Series E ¥1000, ¥5000, ¥10,000, and Series D ¥2000.

== Heisei era ==
=== 2000 ===
Series D (2000)
Image		Value	Dimensions	Main Color	Description		Date of issue
Obverse	Reverse	Value	Dimensions	Main Color	Obverse	Reverse	Date of issue
		¥2000	154 × 76 mm	Green	Shurei-mon	Scene from the Tale of Genji and portrait of Murasaki Shikibu	July 19, 2000
For table standards, see the banknote specification table.

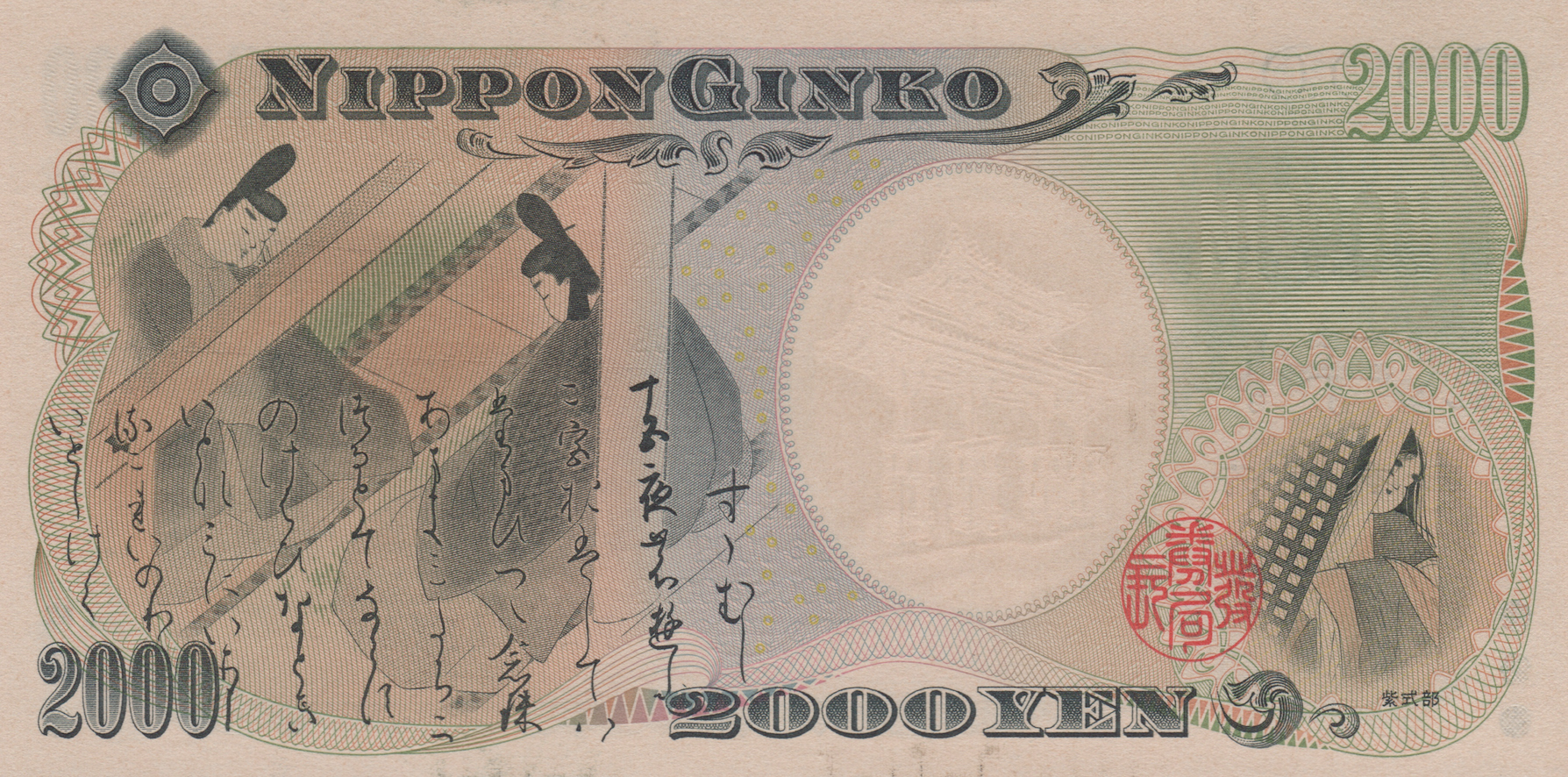
2000 yen note with The Tale of Genji and Murasaki Shikibu on the right corner

This is the current issue. The 2000 yen note was first issued on July 19, 2000, to commemorate the 26th G8 summit in Okinawa and the 2000 millennium year as well. Pictured on the front of the note is Shureimon, a famous gate in Naha, Okinawa near the site of the summit. The other side features a scene from The Tale of Genji and the author Murasaki Shikibu on the lower right corner. The motif of the scene was taken from the 12th century illuminated handscrolls of the novel kept at the Tokugawa Art Museum in Nagoya. The image of Murasaki Shikibu is taken from the Gotoh edition of the Murasaki Shikibu Diary Emaki held at the Gotoh Museum.

Many Japanese consider the 2000 yen note a novelty as it is the only Japanese denomination whose first digit is 2. To promote the circulation of the notes, some companies had started paying wages in them. The series D is the first to display the EURion constellation.

=== 2004 ===
Series E banknotes were introduced in 2004 in ¥1000, ¥5000, and ¥10,000 denominations. The EURion constellation pattern is present in the designs.

The 2004 series started the printing process from 2002 to 2004.

Series E (2004)
Image		Value	Dimensions	Main Color	Description		Date of issue	Issue suspended
Obverse	Reverse	Value	Dimensions	Main Color	Obverse	Reverse	Date of issue	Issue suspended
		¥1000	150 × 76 mm	Blue	Noguchi Hideyo	Mount Fuji, Lake Motosu and cherry blossoms	November 1, 2004	2026 - 2027 (expected)
		¥5000	156 × 76 mm	Purple	Higuchi Ichiyō	Kakitsubata-zu (Painting of irises, a work by Ogata Kōrin)	November 1, 2004	2026 - 2027 (expected)
		¥10,000	160 × 76 mm	Brown	Fukuzawa Yukichi	Statue of hōō (phoenix) at Byōdō-in	November 1, 2004	2026 - 2027 (expected)
For table standards, see the banknote specification table.

The suspension of issuance of new Series E banknotes will be confirmed later.

== Reiwa era ==
=== 2024 ===
On April 9, 2019, Finance Minister Tarō Asō announced new designs for the ¥1000, ¥5000, and ¥10,000 notes, for use beginning on July 3, 2024. The ¥1000 bill features Kitasato Shibasaburō and The Great Wave off Kanagawa, the ¥5000 bill features Tsuda Umeko and wisteria flowers, and the ¥10,000 bill features Shibusawa Eiichi and Tokyo Station. This is the first series of banknotes that feature English text, with the words "Bank of Japan" in the front.

The 2024 series started the printing process from 2021 to 2024.

Series F (2024)
Image		Value	Dimensions	Main Color	Description		Date of issue
Obverse	Reverse	Value	Dimensions	Main Color	Obverse	Reverse	Date of issue
		¥1000	150 × 76 mm	Blue	Kitasato Shibasaburō	The Great Wave off Kanagawa (from Thirty-six Views of Mount Fuji series by Hokusai)	July 3, 2024
		¥5000	156 × 76 mm	Purple	Tsuda Umeko	Wisteria flowers	July 3, 2024
		¥10,000	160 × 76 mm	Brown	Shibusawa Eiichi	Tokyo Station (Marunouchi side)	July 3, 2024
For table standards, see the banknote specification table.

This is the current issue. The EURion constellation pattern can be observed on the series F.
