= 100 yen note =

Japanese yen note

- Country: Japan
- Value: 100 Japanese yen
- Security features: Watermarks
- Years of printing: September 8, 1885 – August 1, 1974

Obverse
- Design: Various

Reverse
- Design: Various

The 100 yen note (百円紙幣) was a denomination of Japanese yen issued from 1885 to 1974 in paper form. Eight different types were issued over the period of almost a century before they were replaced by the 100 yen coin. Only two of the issued notes continue to retain their legal tender status, both of which were issued after World War II. Like other old Japanese banknotes they are worth more on the collector's market than at face value.

== Issues ==
One hundred yen notes were first issued in 1885, and are nicknamed "Daikoku notes" based on the obverse design. Only 27 of these notes are known to exist today due to the small amount that was issued, and a flaw with how the notes were made. "Daikoku notes" were eventually withdrawn from circulation on March 31, 1939. The second issue came on November 15, 1891, as a fix to a problem with the first issue notes. The "Daikoku notes" had been made with konjac powder to increase the strength of the paper, but as a result the notes were eaten by mice and insects. These notes feature Fujiwara no Kamatari on the obverse, while the reverse is of a similar design as the preceding. For one reason or another the second issue was also made in a small amount resulting in few being known today. As with the first series, the second series was withdrawn from circulation in 1939.

The third issue debuted on December 25, 1900, and are nicknamed "purple back" notes as the reverse side has a purple hue. As with the first two issues, these notes were withdrawn from circulation in 1939. The fourth issue started on January 1, 1930, and have a design similar to the "purple backs" with the obverse featuring Prince Shōtoku, and Hōryū-ji on the reverse. These notes were withdrawn from circulation on March 2, 1946. Fifth issue notes were made starting in 1944, and ending in 1946 with a similar design to the preceding issue. Serial numbers for this issue are numbered up to 900,000 with replacement notes made after this amount. The final pre-yen conversion notes were issued from 1945 to 1946, and are the sixth ones to be issued. The one-year waiting period was not put into place before the suspension and later withdrawal of the sen. Eventually, a law was passed on March 2, 1946, that demonetized any bill that had been issued up to that date. Prior notice had already been given on February 17 with people having the option to exchange old bills for the newly made "A series".

With the conversion of the yen the final two issues dubbed "series A", and "series B" notes were made. The initial idea was to suppress inflation which invalidated all of the old 100 bank notes that were in circulation at the time. The switch happened quickly by means of forced deposits which also caused more than one variety of the "A series" notes being made. As with the preceding series, notes numbered after 900,000 are replacement notes. "Series A" notes were first issued on March 1, 1946, and were withdrawn from circulation on June 5, 1956. The final series of 100 yen notes are called "series B" notes, which were made to deter counterfeiting which had effected the "A" notes. These new notes were first issued on December 1, 1953, causing the "A" notes to quickly be redeemed. While the first silver 100 yen coins were minted in 1957, the note form continued to circulate alongside the coins. The beginning of the end for the 100 yen note came on August 26, 1966, when the Japanese cabinet voted to abolish the note. On August 1, 1974, one hundred yen notes were withdrawn from circulation, and both "series A", and "series B" notes were allowed to retain their legal tender status.

== Gallery ==
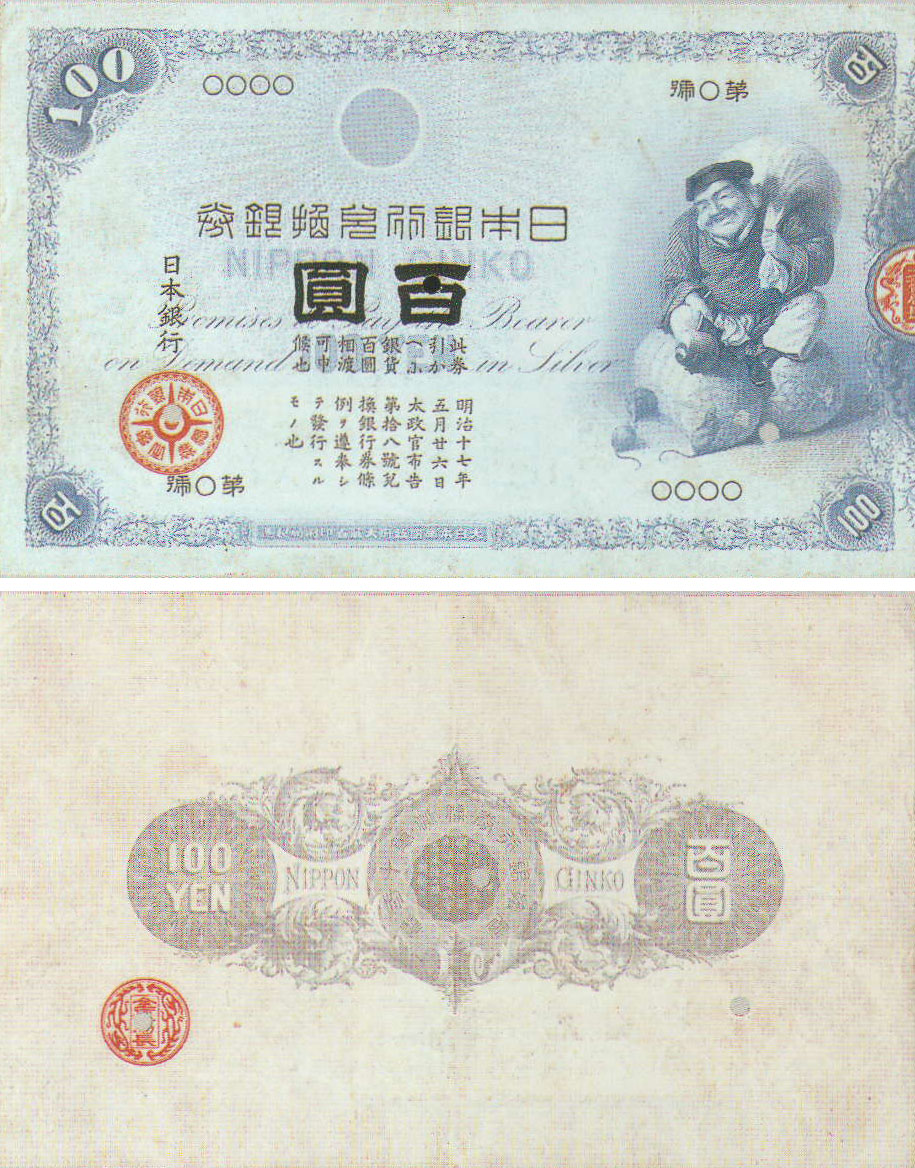
An example of a "Daikoku note", first issued in 1885

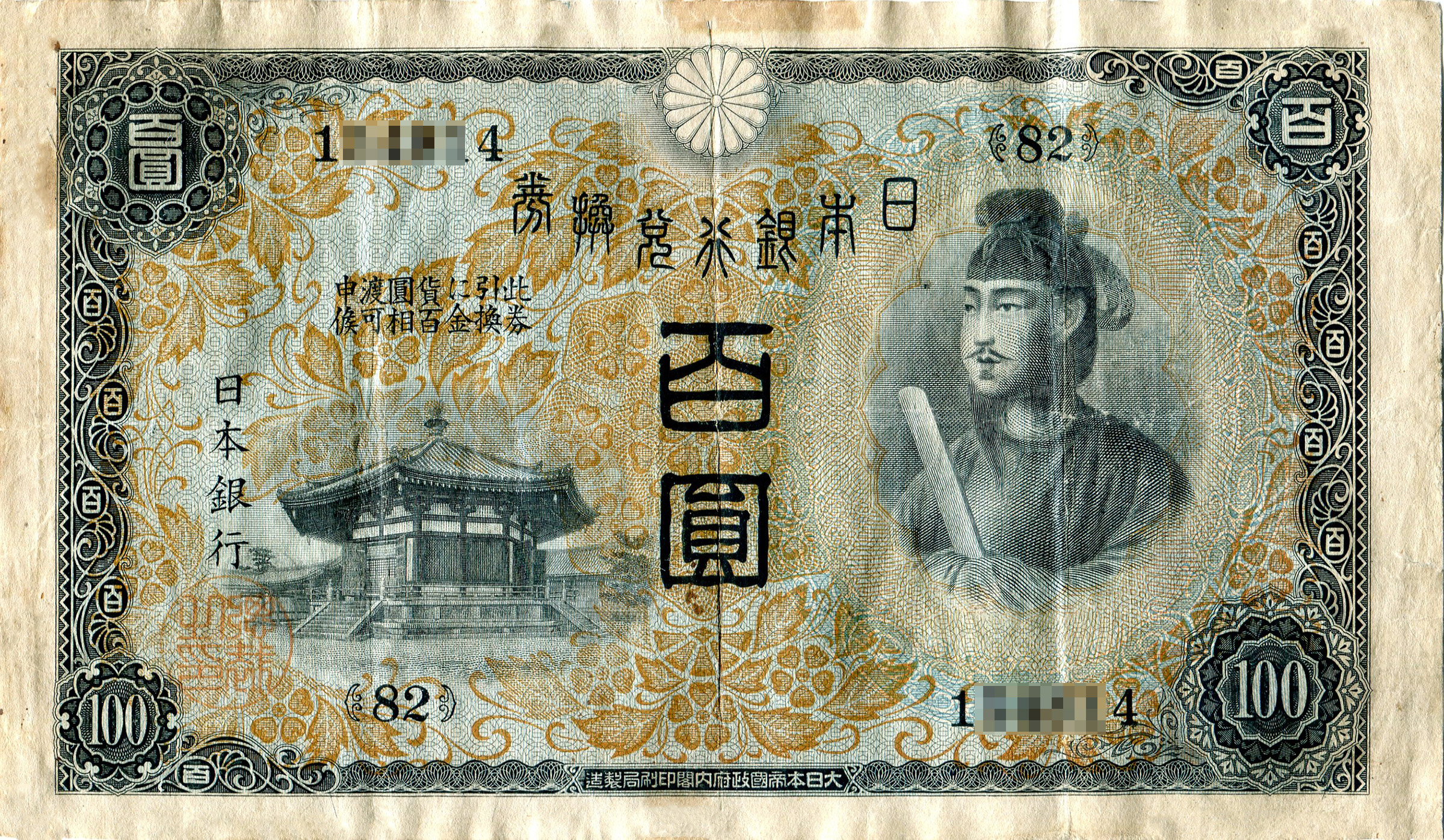
4th issue note featuring Prince Shōtoku on the obverse.
Issued: 1930 to 1946.

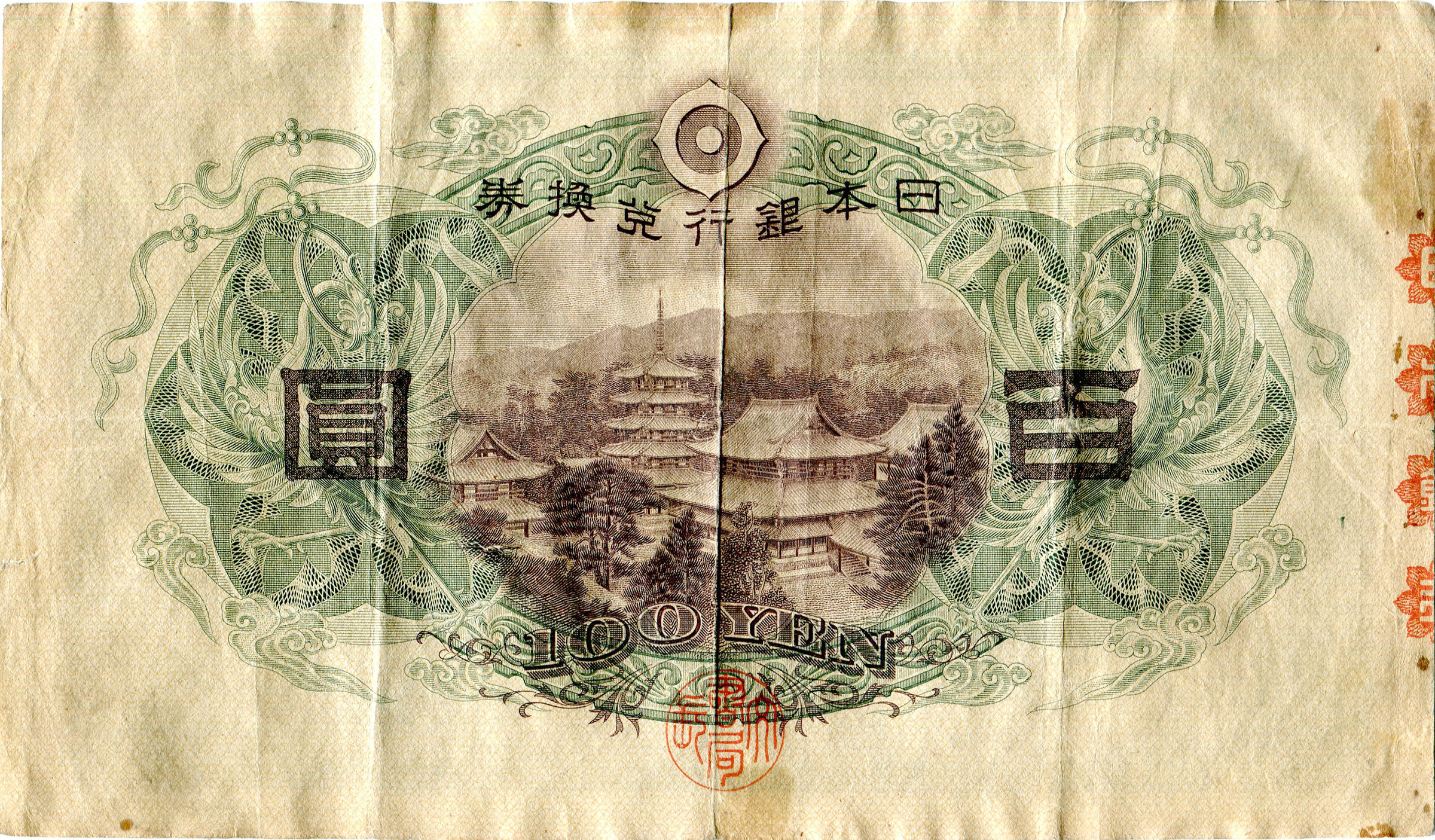
Reverse of a 4th issue note

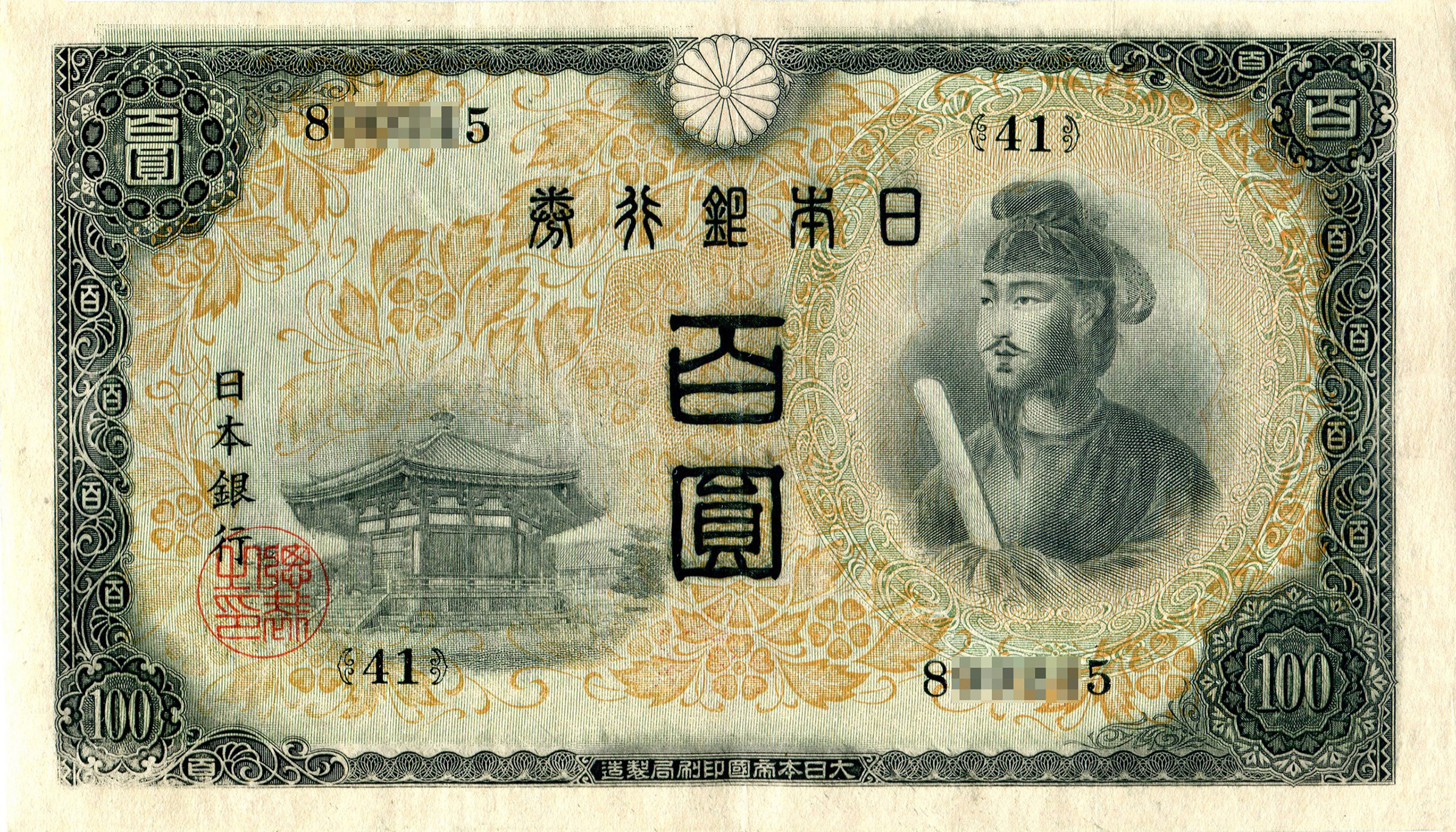
Obverse of a fifth issue note.
Issued: 1944 to 1946.

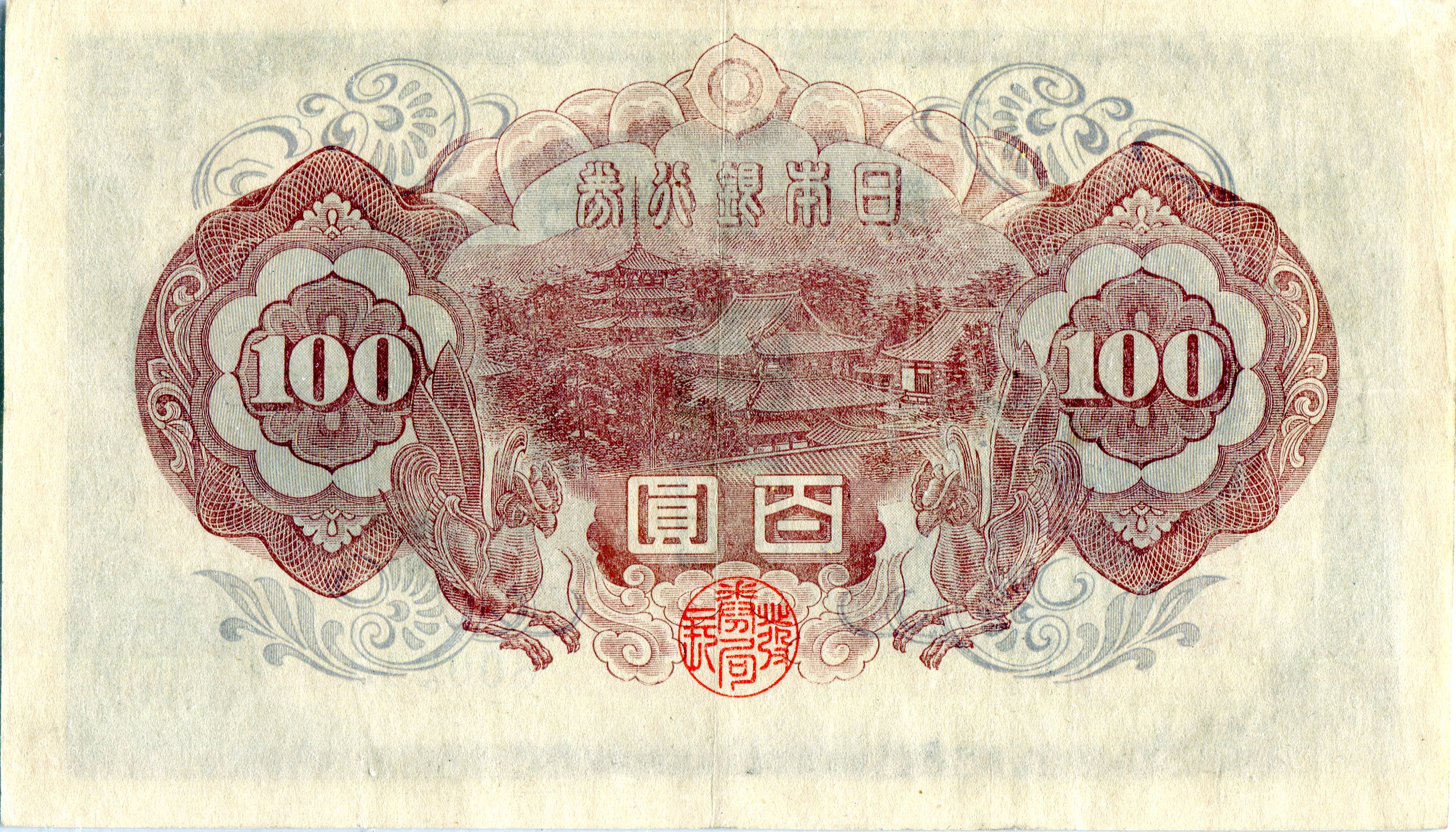
Reverse of a 5th issue note

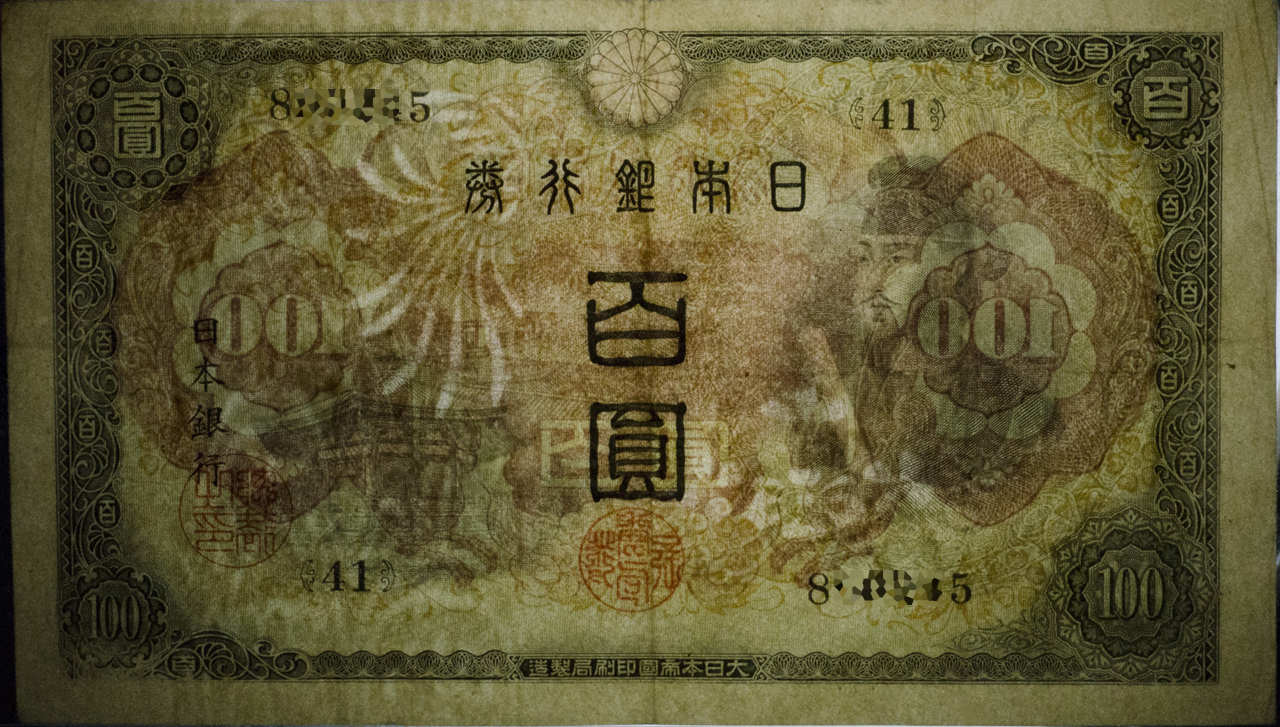
Watermark used for fifth issue notes

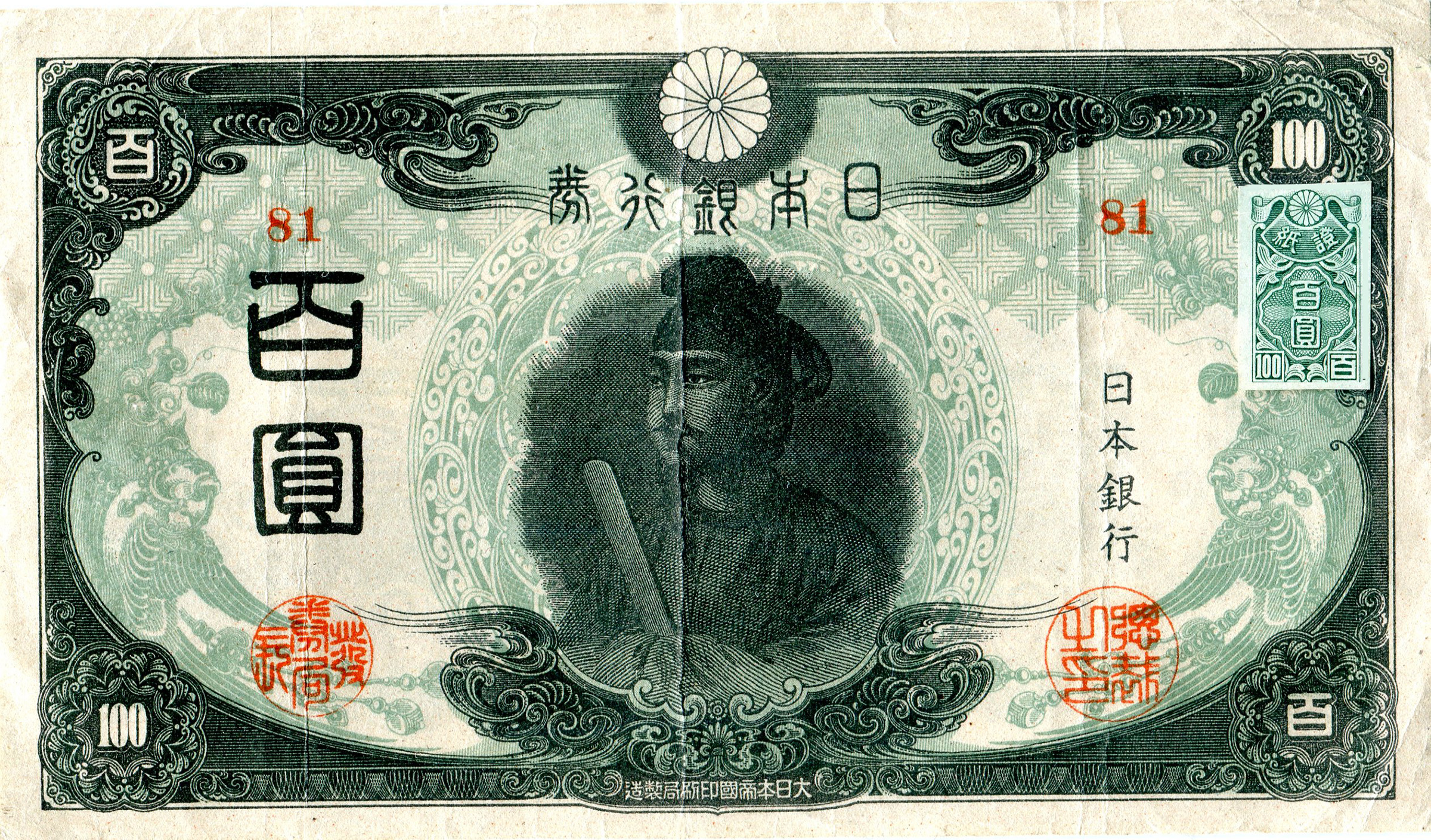
Obverse of a sixth issue note.
Issued: 1945 to 1946.

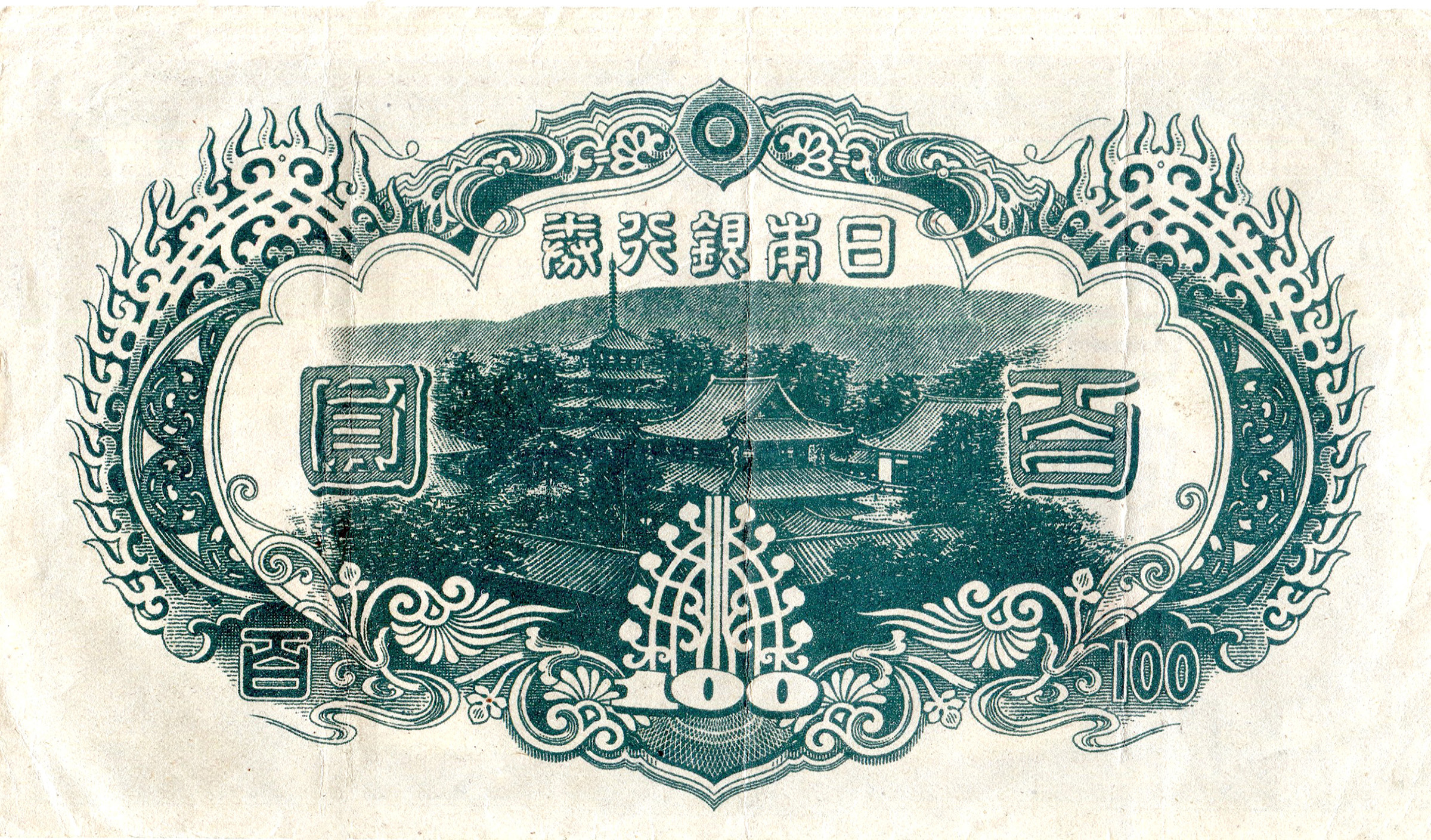
Reverse of a 6th issue note

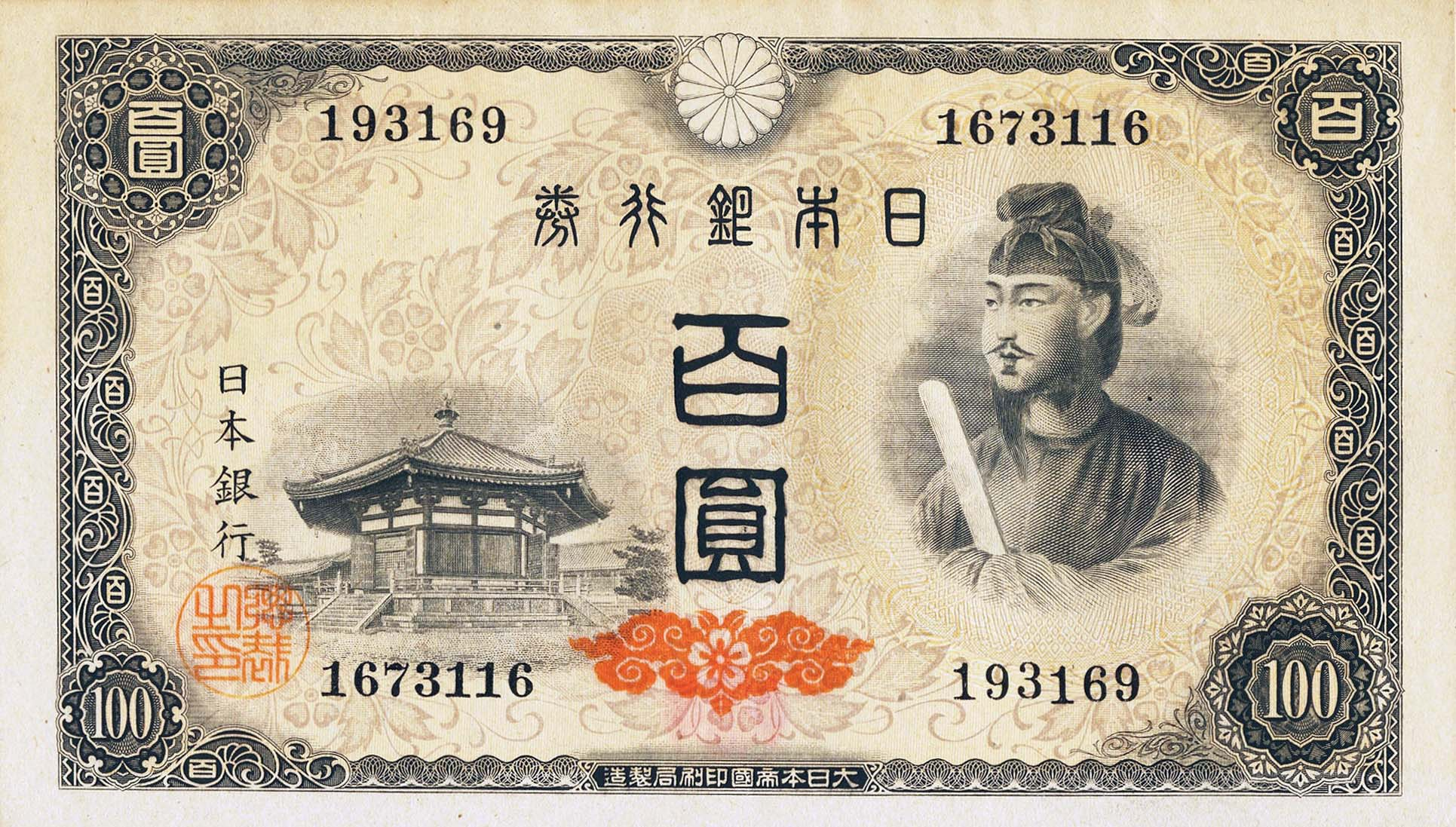
"Series A" note obverse.
Issued: 1946 to 1956.

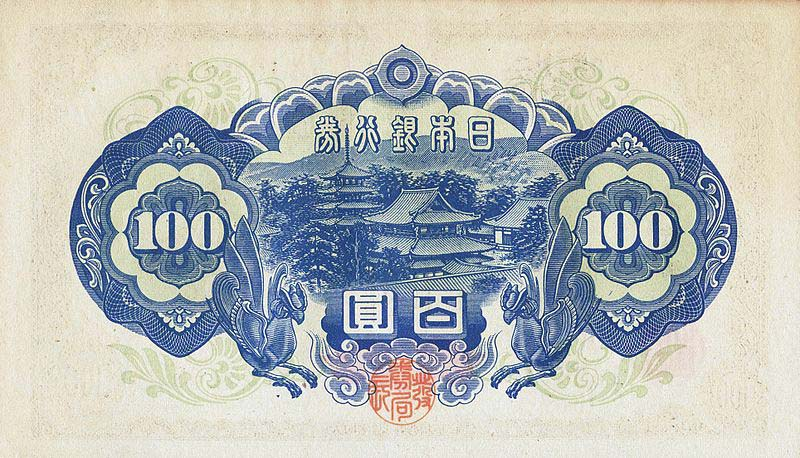
"Series A" note reverse

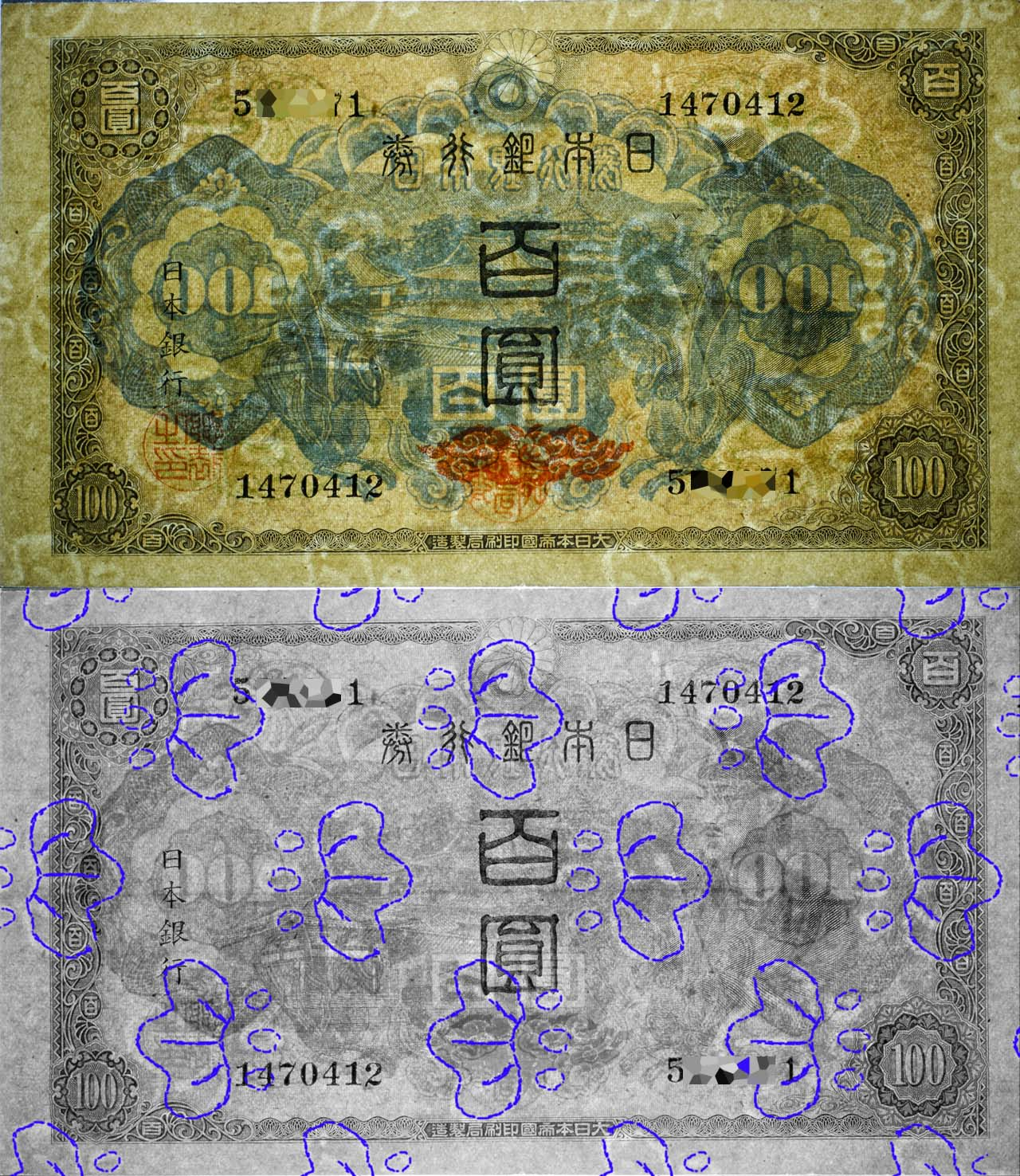
Watermarks used on "Series A" notes

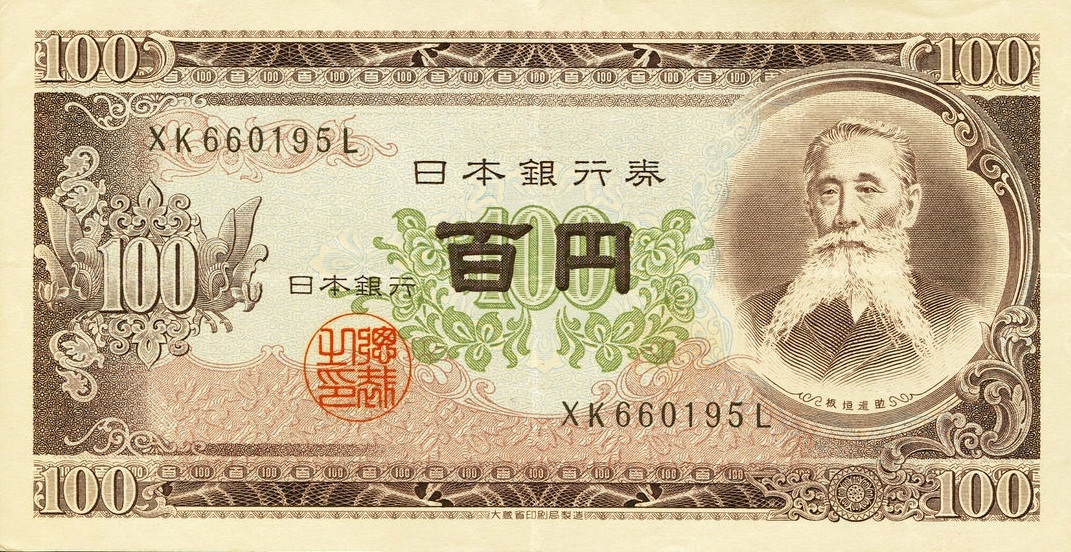
"Series B" note obverse.
Issued: 1953 to 1974.

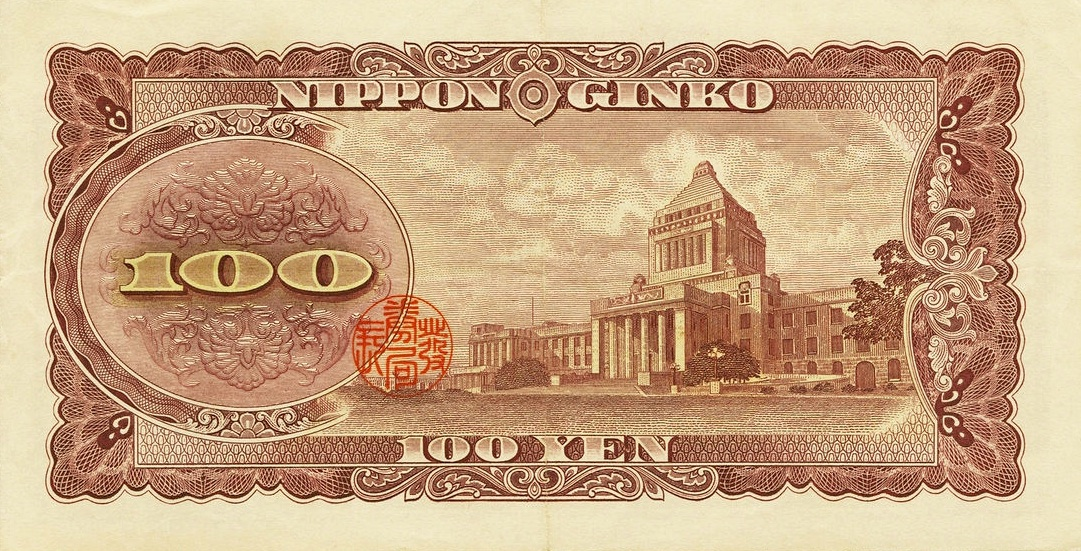
"Series B" note reverse

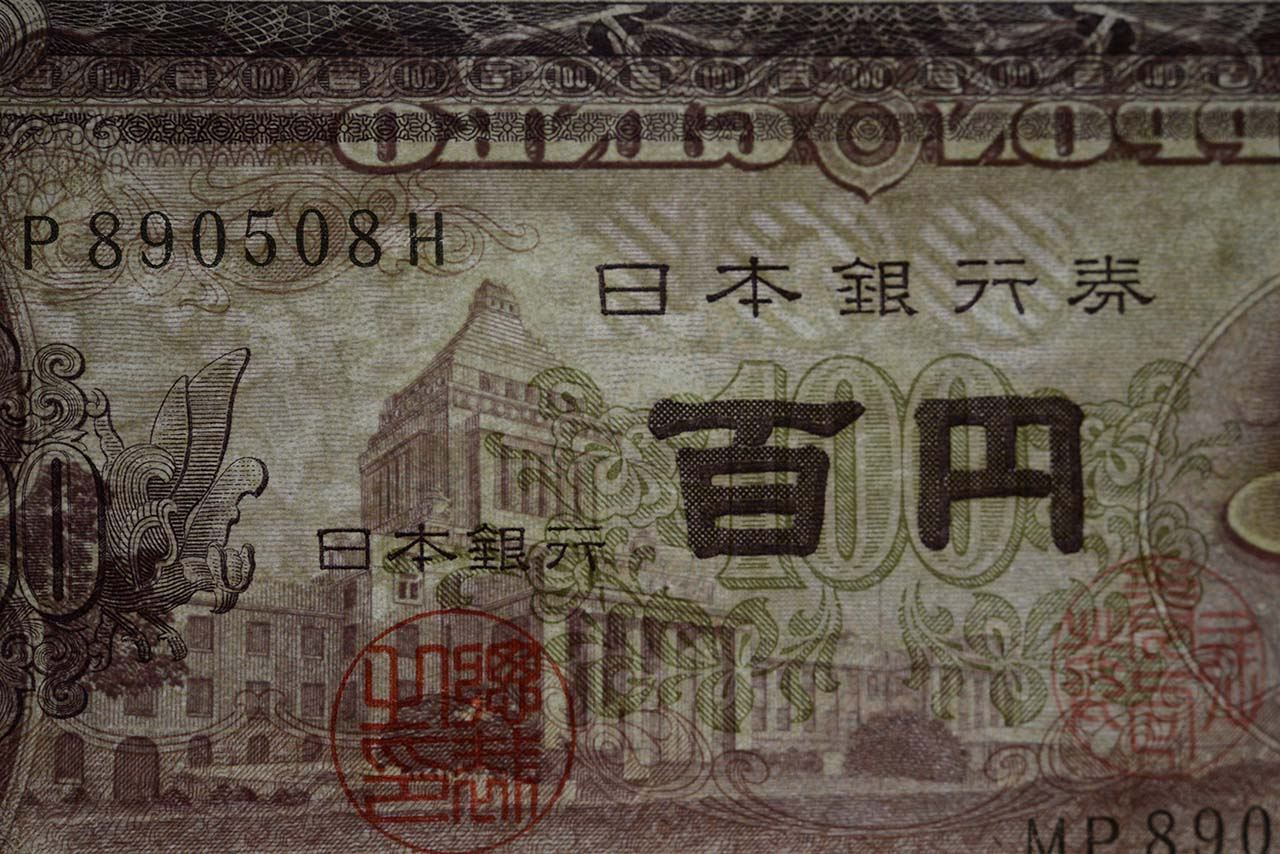
Watermarks used on "Series B" notes

== See also ==
- Banknotes of the Japanese yen
- Japanese military currency
- 100-yen shop
