= 1000 yen note =

Japanese banknote

¥1,000
- Country: Japan
- Value: 1,000 Yen
- Width: 150 mm
- Height: 76 mm
- Security features: Fluorescent ink, intaglio printing, latent imaging, luminescent ink, microprinting, pearl ink, tactile marks, watermark, watermark-bar pattern, EURion constellation
- Years of printing: 1950, 1963 (black serial numbers), 1976 (blue serial numbers), 1984 (black serial numbers), 1990 (blue serial numbers), 1993 (brown serial numbers), 2000 (green serial numbers), 2004 (black serial numbers), 2011 (brown serial numbers), 2019 (blue serial numbers), 2024

Obverse
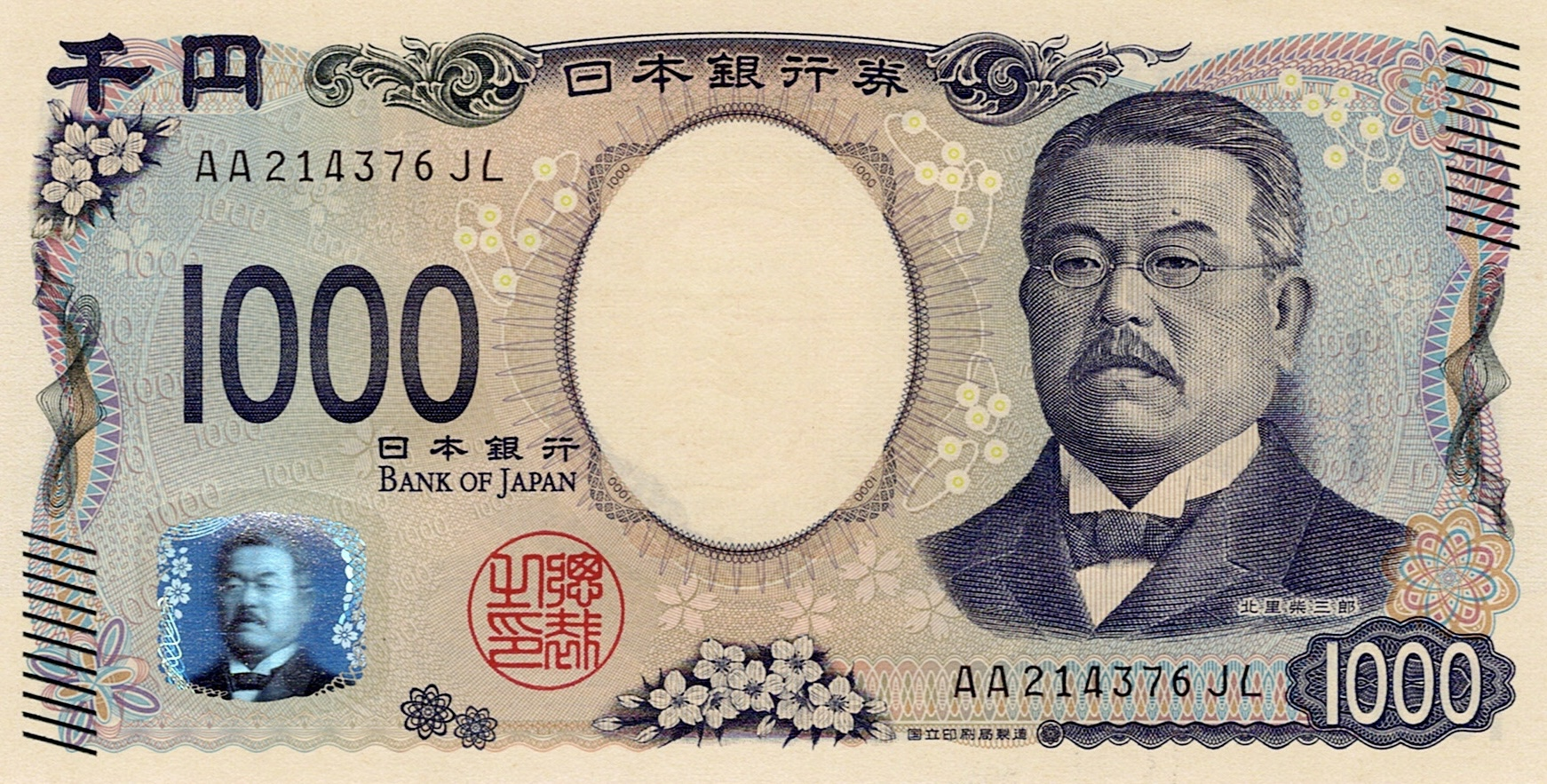
- Design: Portrait of Kitasato Shibasaburō

Reverse
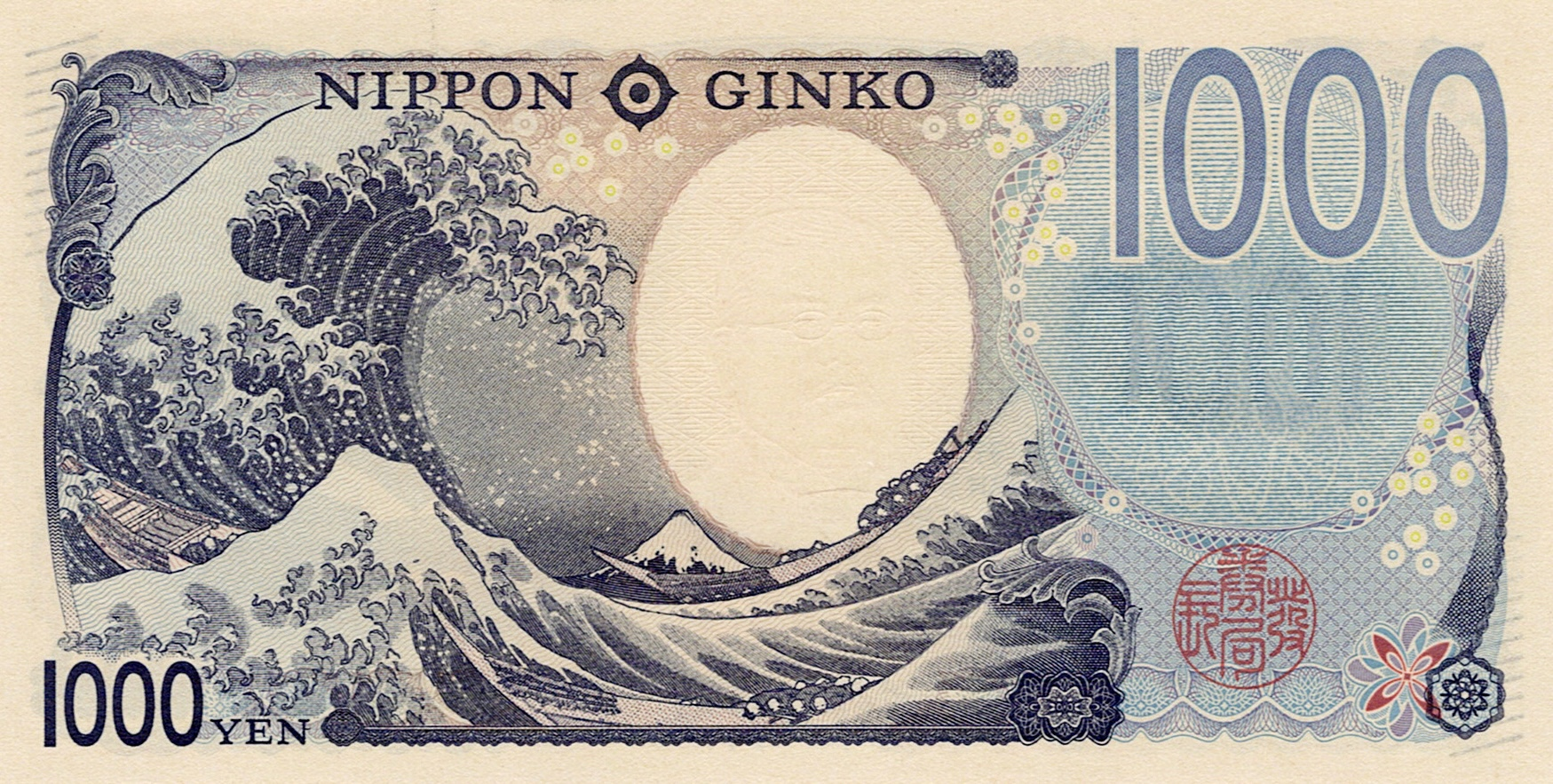
- Design: The Great Wave off Kanagawa

The ¥1,000 note is currently the lowest value yen banknote and has been used since 1945, excluding a brief period between 1946 and 1950 during the Allied occupation of Japan.

The sixth series (series F) notes are currently in circulation and are the smallest of the three common bank notes. Extensive anti-counterfeiting measures are present in the newest banknotes. While the older notes are no longer issued, they continue to be legal tender.

== Former notes ==
=== Series 甲 ===
The first ¥1,000 note was released on 17 August 1945. At the time successive series of bank notes were labelled as series 甲, 乙, 丙, 丁 or as series い, ろ as opposed to series A, B, C, D, E. It measured 172 × 100 mm and featured images of the legendary prince Yamato Takeru and the Shinto shrine Takebe taisha. It was removed from circulation in 1954.

=== Series A ===
A series A bank note was planned in 1946 but never released, along with other planned bank notes.

=== Series B ===
The series B note measured 164 x 76 mm and entered circulation on 1 July 1950. The obverse displayed an image of the semi-legendary regent and politician under Empress Suiko, Prince Shōtoku. The reverse side contained an image of the "Yumedono" (literally Hall of Dreams) in the grounds of Hōryū-ji, a Buddhist temple located in Nara Prefecture. Only one version of the bank note existed, and it was removed from circulation on 4 January 1965.

=== Series C ===
Like its predecessor, the series C note measured 164 x 76 mm. It entered circulation on 1 November 1963. The obverse side contained a portrait of Itō Hirobumi, who, under Emperor Meiji, was the first Prime Minister of Japan, assuming office in 1885. The reverse side displayed an image of the Bank of Japan. The series C note was released with the bank number in two different colours: black (from 1963) and blue (from 1976). It was removed from circulation on 4 January 1986.

=== Series D ===
The series D note, like the series E note and series F, measured 150 x 76 mm. It entered circulation on 1 November 1984. The obverse side contained a portrait of the Meiji period novelist Natsume Sōseki, whose famous works include I Am a Cat and Kokoro. The reverse side featured two red-crowned cranes. The series D note was released with the bank number in four different colours: black (from 1984), blue (from 1990), brown (from 1993) and green (from 2000). It was removed from circulation on 2 April 2007.

=== Series E ===
The front side shows a portrait of Hideyo Noguchi, who in 1911 discovered the agent of syphilis as the cause of progressive paralytic disease. The reverse depicts Mount Fuji and cherry blossoms, adapted from a photograph by Koyo Okada. It was first issued on 1 November 2004. Extensive anti-counterfeiting measures are present in the newest banknotes. They include intaglio printing, holograms, microprinting, fluorescent ink, latent images, watermarks, and angle-sensitive ink. The series E notes will continue to remain in circulation alongside the newly-issued series F notes from 2024.

=== Series F ===
The sixth series (series F) notes are currently in circulation, and are the smallest of the three common bank notes, measuring 150 x 76 mm. The ¥1,000 bill features Kitasato Shibasaburō and The Great Wave off Kanagawa. This is also the first series of bank note that features English. It was first issued on 3 July 2024.

== Gallery ==
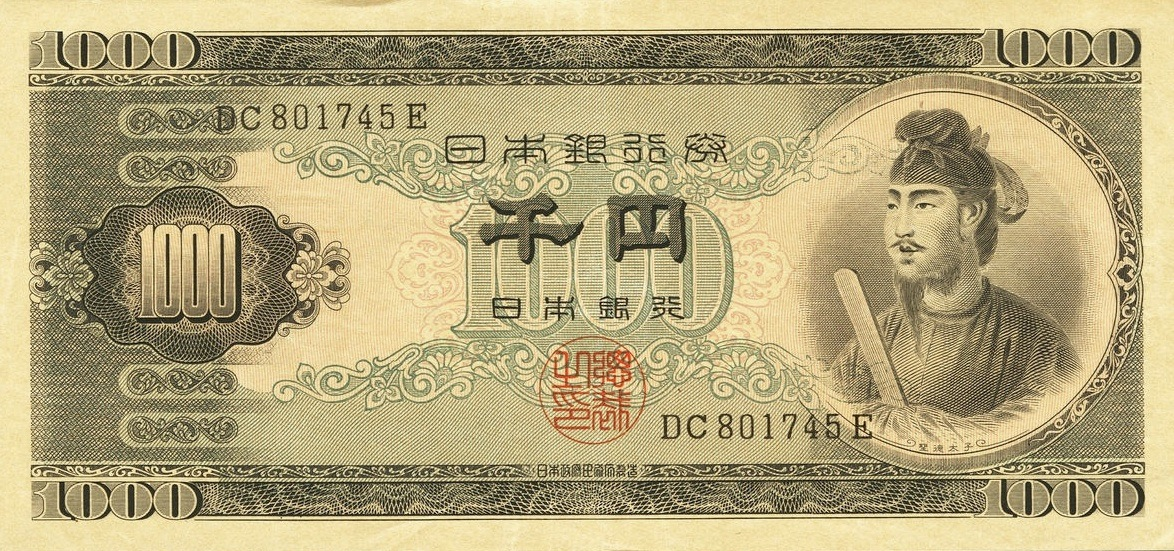
Series B ¥1,000 note (1950)

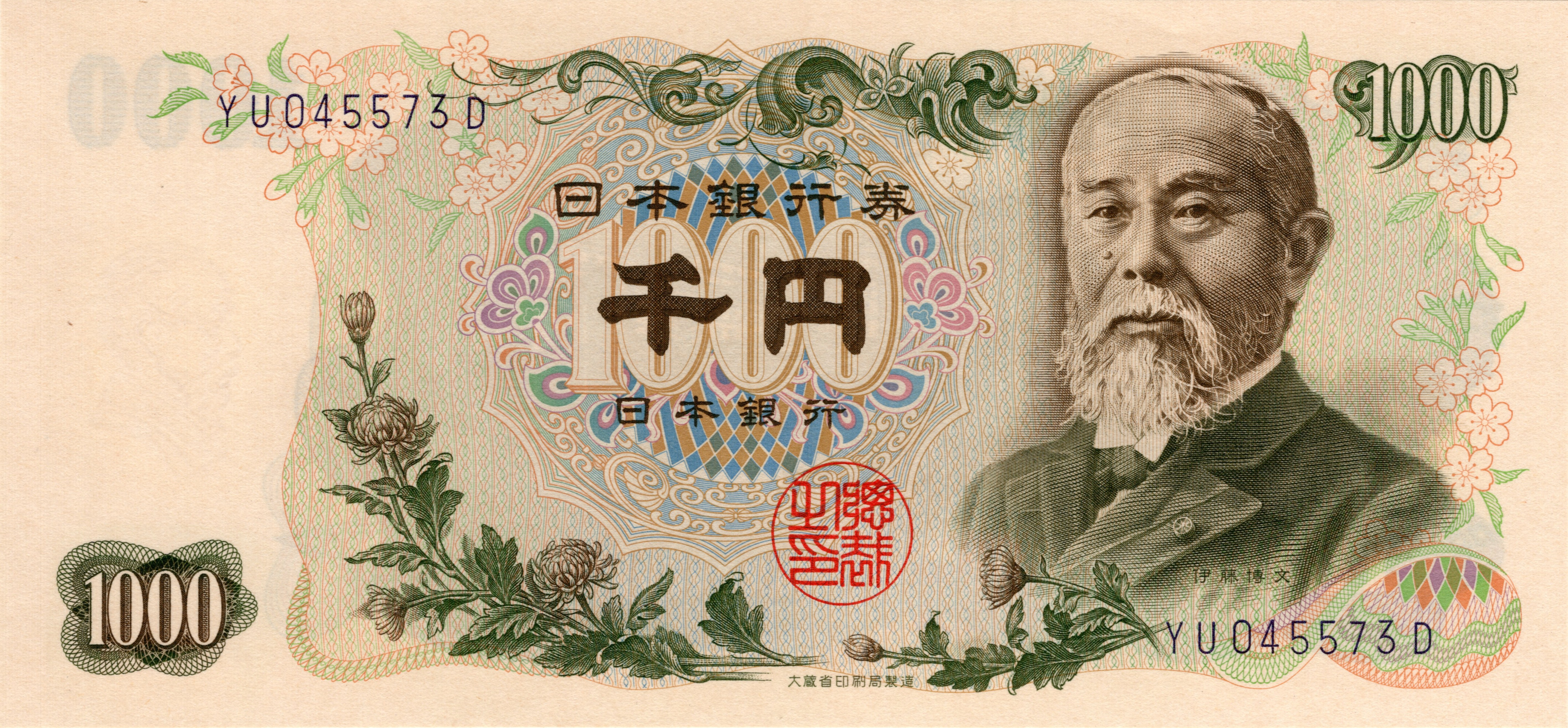
Series C ¥1,000 note (1963)

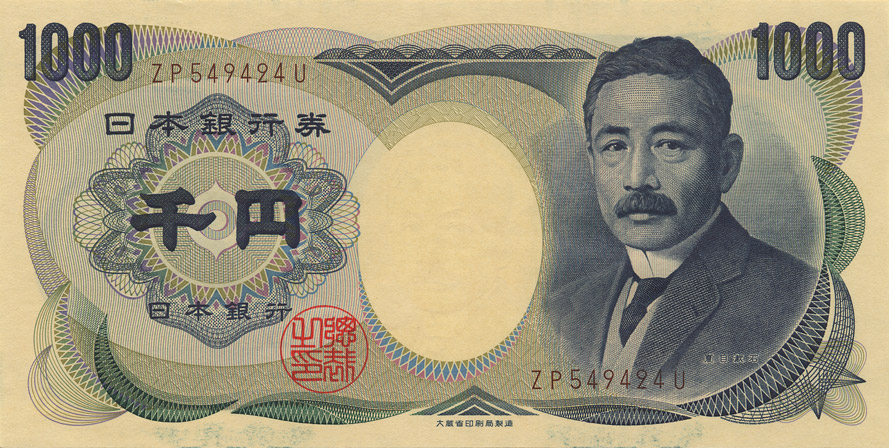
Series D ¥1,000 note (1984)

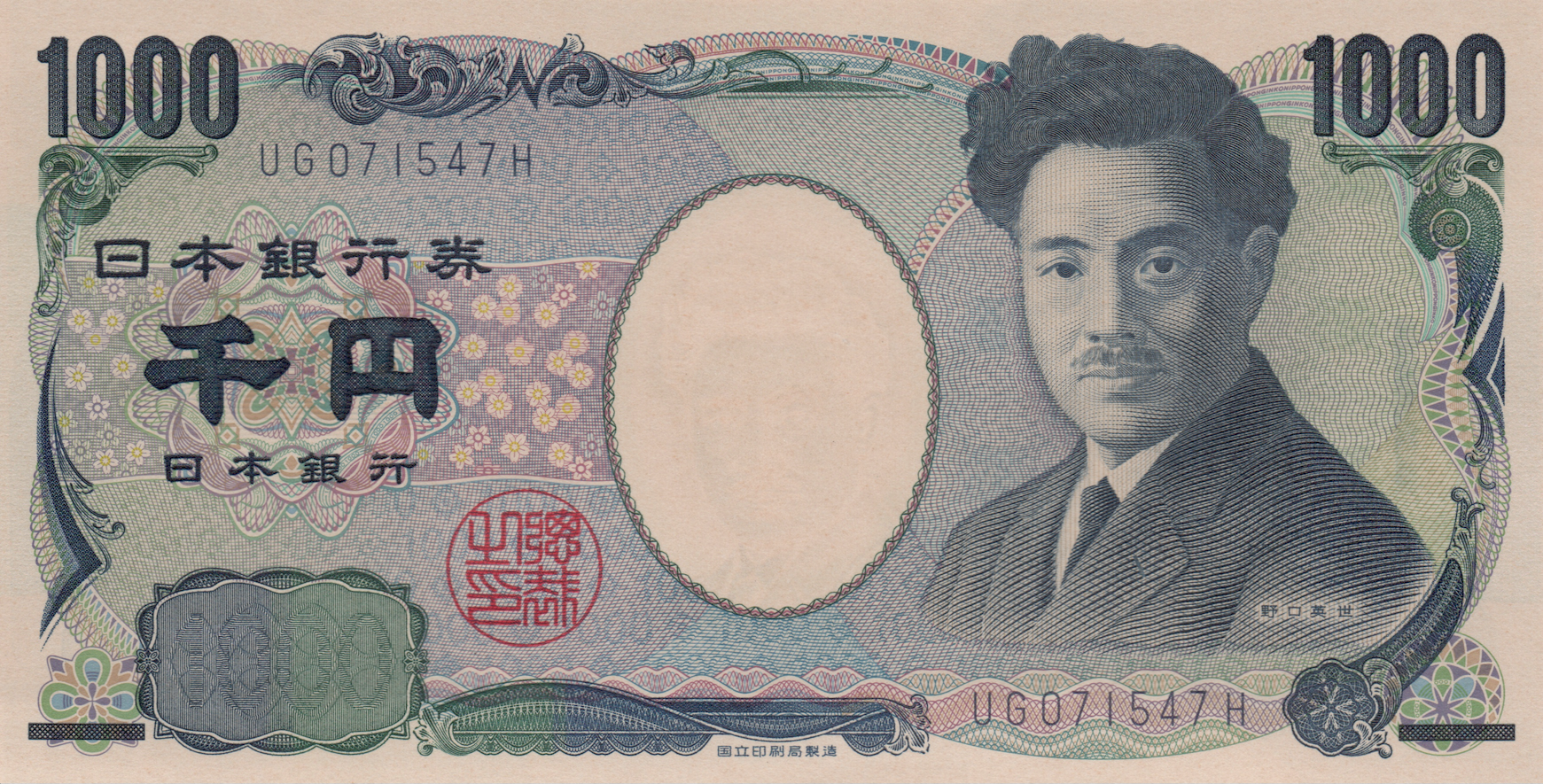
Series E ¥1,000 note (2004)

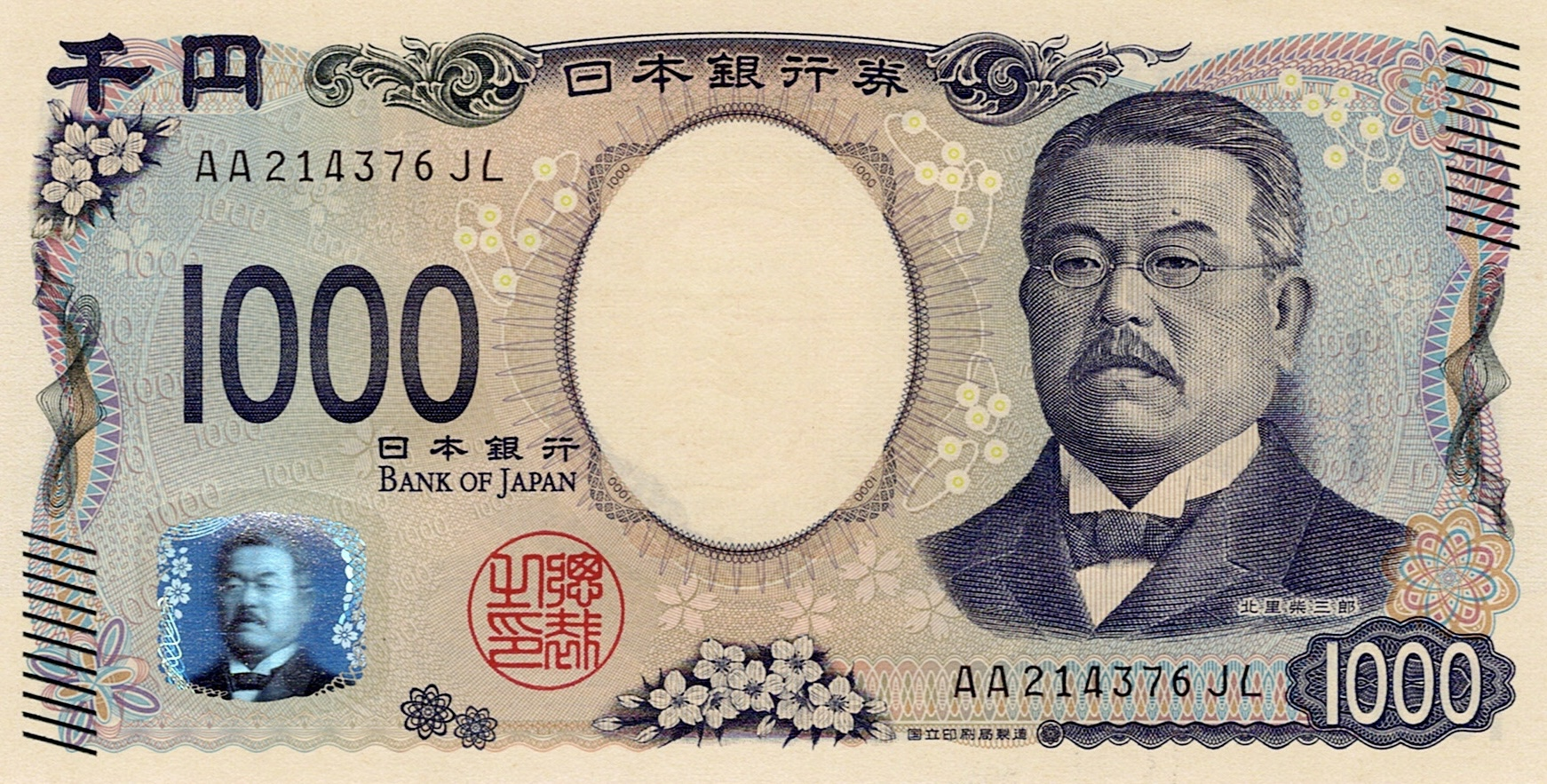
Series F ¥1,000 note (2024)

== See also ==
- Banknotes of the Japanese yen
