= 5000 yen note =

Japanese paper currency

¥5,000
- Country: Japan
- Value: 5,000 Yen
- Width: 156 mm
- Height: 76 mm
- Security features: Hologram, Intaglio printing, Latent image, Luminescent ink, Microprinting, Pearl ink, Tactile marks, Watermark, Watermark-Bar pattern, EURion constellation
- Years of printing: 1957, 1984 (Black serial numbers), 1993 (Brown serial numbers), 2004 (Black serial numbers), 2014 (Brown serial numbers), 2024

Obverse
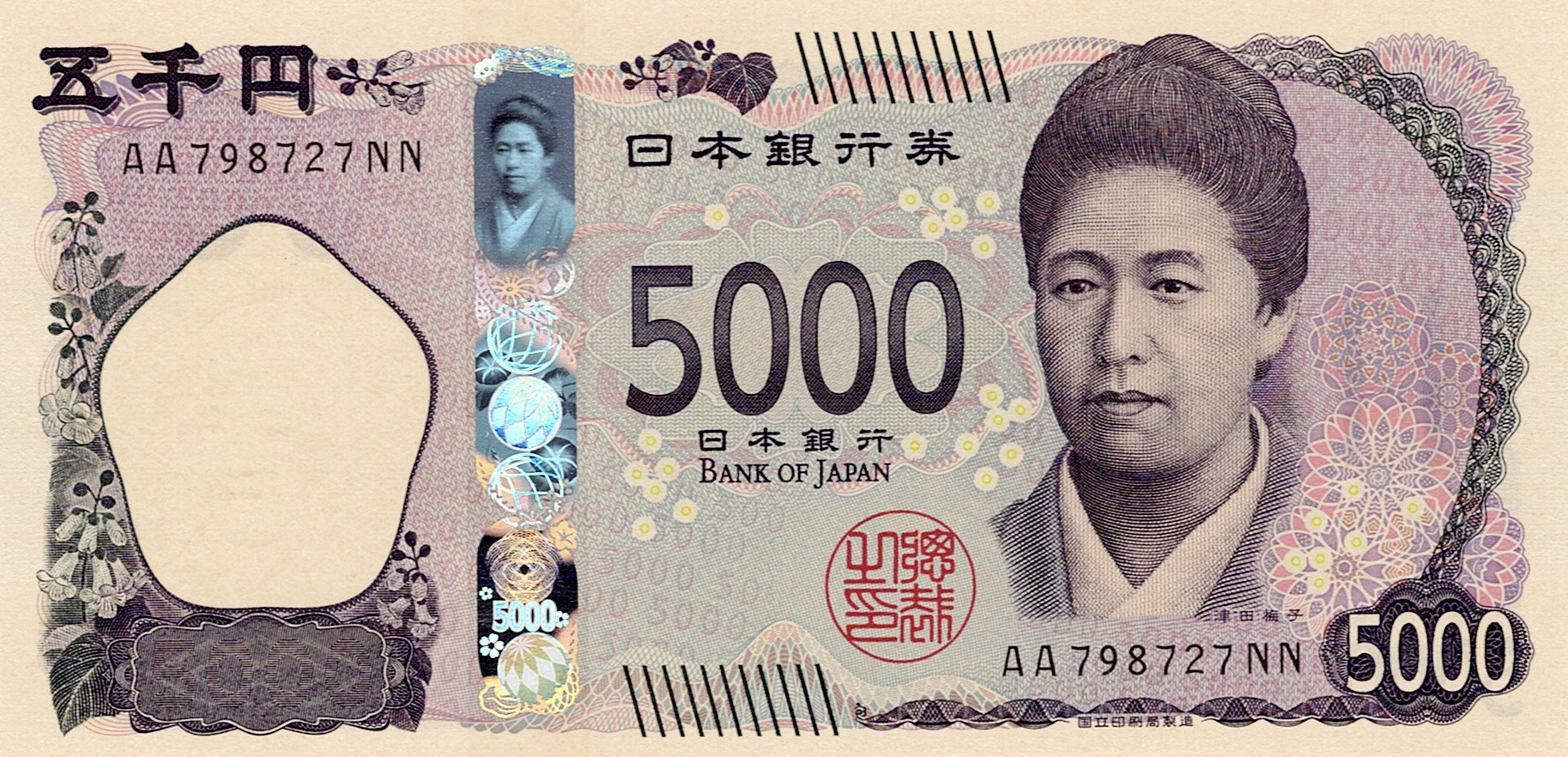
- Design: Portrait of Tsuda Umeko

Reverse
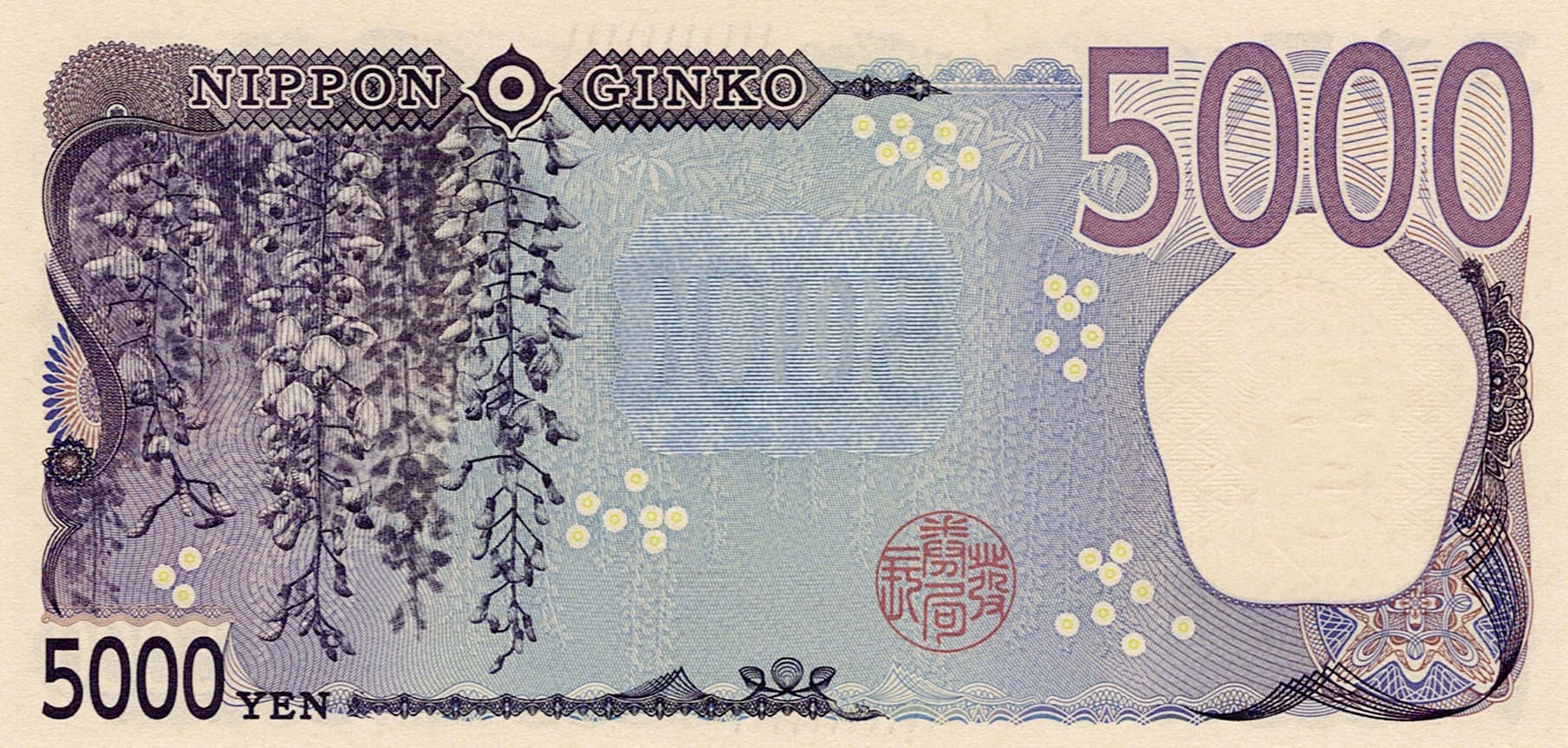
- Design: Wisteria flowers

The ¥5,000 note (五千円紙幣 gosen-en shihei) is a banknote denomination of the Japanese yen. It was first introduced in Japan in 1957 to the third series of banknote releases (Series C). The latest release is Series F (2024).

== Series ==
=== Series C ===
The green-brown note was introduced on 1 October 1957. It featured Prince Shōtoku and the headquarters of the Bank of Japan.

=== Series D ===
The purple note was introduced on 1 November 1984. It featured Nitobe Inazō, Mount Fuji, and Lake Motosu.

=== Series E ===
The series was released on 1 November 2004. The front side includes a portrait of Ichiyo Higuchi, a Meiji era writer and poet. The reverse side depicts Japanese irises (kakitsubata) from the Irises screen by Korin Ogata.

Extensive anti-counterfeiting measures are present in the banknote. They include intaglio printing, holograms, microprinting, fluorescent ink, latent images, watermarks, and angle-sensitive ink.

=== Series F ===
The series was released on July 3, 2024. The ¥5,000 bill featured Tsuda Umeko and wisteria flowers.

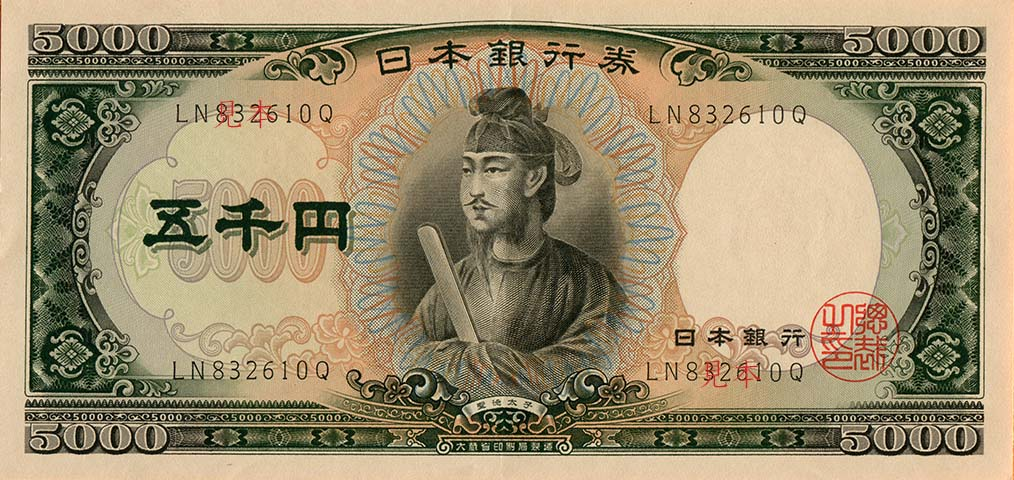
Series C ¥5,000 note (1957)

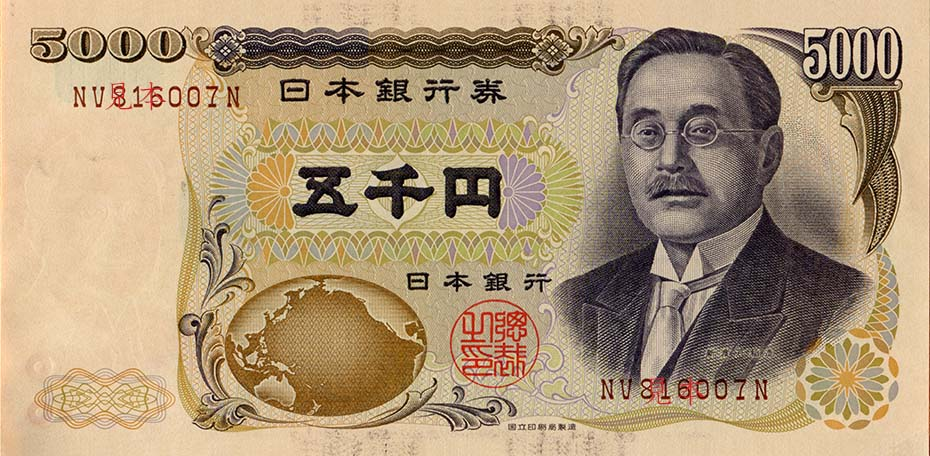
Series D ¥5,000 note (1984)

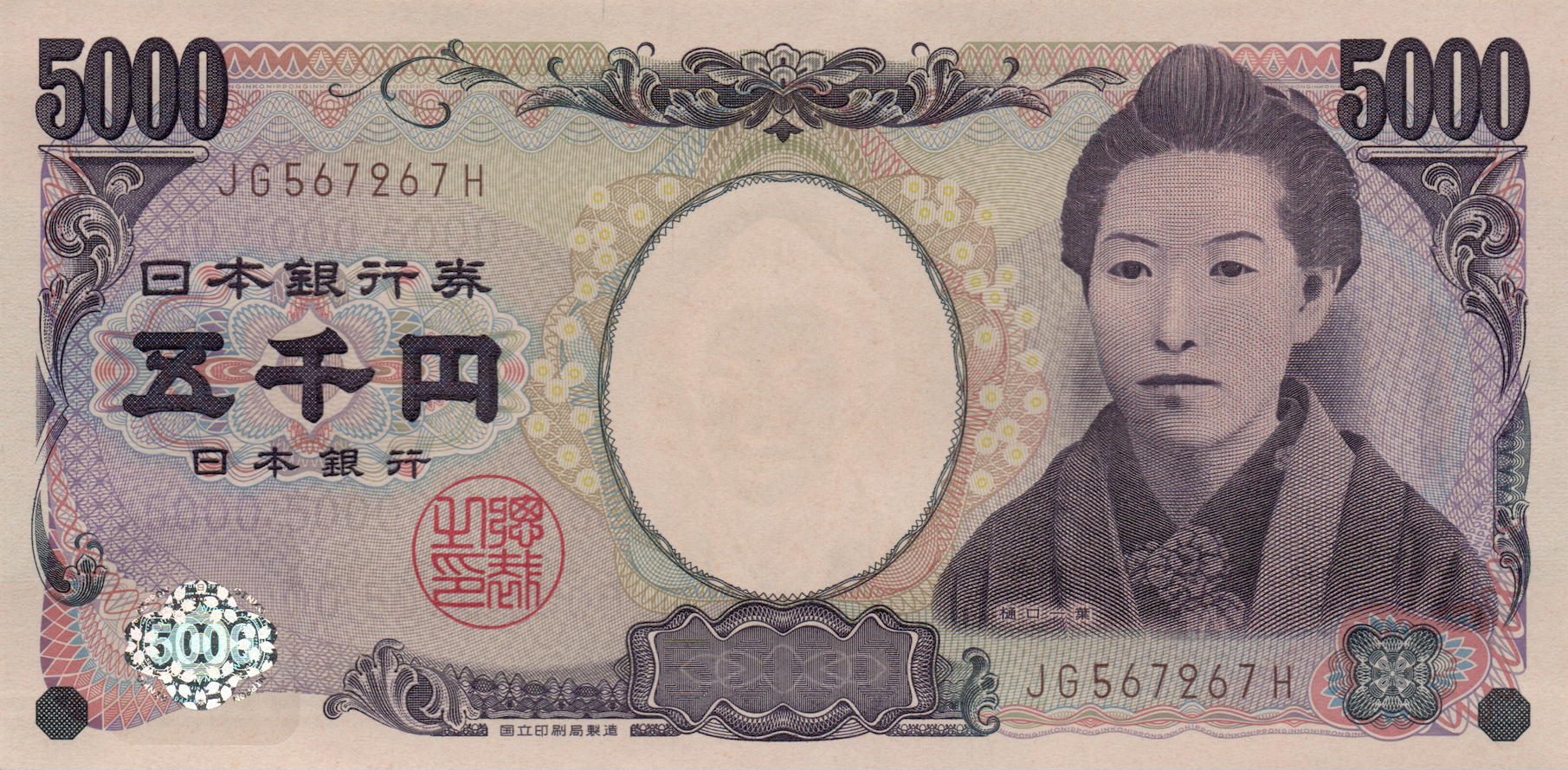
Series E ¥5,000 note (2004)

== See also ==
- Banknotes of the Japanese yen
