= Ube Shrine =

Shinto shrine in Tottori, Japan

Ube Jinja 宇倍神社
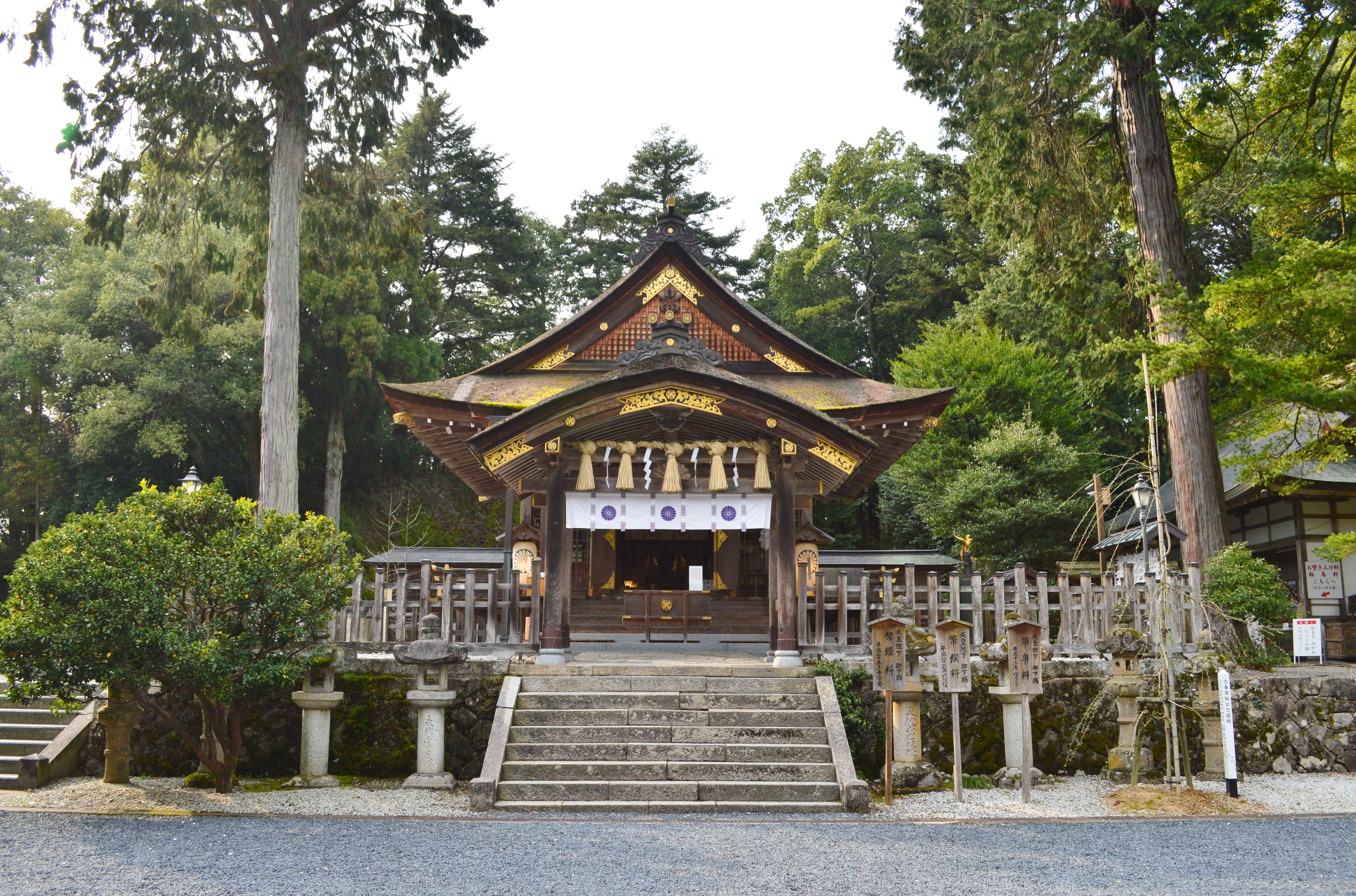
- Haiden of Ube Jinja

- Location within Tottori Prefecture Location within Japan

Religion
- Affiliation: Shinto
- Deity: Takenouchi no Sukune
- Festival: April 21

Location
- Location: 651 Ichinomiya, Kokufu-cho, Tottori-shi, Tottori-ken
- Interactive map of Ube Jinja 宇倍神社
- Coordinates: 35°28′51″N 134°16′0.8″E

Architecture
- Established: unknown

Website
- Official website

Ube Jinja (宇倍神社) is a Shinto shrine in the Kokufu-cho neighborhood of the city of Tottori in Tottori Prefecture, Japan. It is the ichinomiya of former Inaba Province. The main festival of the shrine is held annually on April 21.

== Enshrined kami ==
The kami enshrined at Ube Jinja is:

- Takenouchi no Sukune (武内宿禰), the legendary Japanese hero-statesman of the 1st century, who is also regarded as a deity of longevity.

== History ==
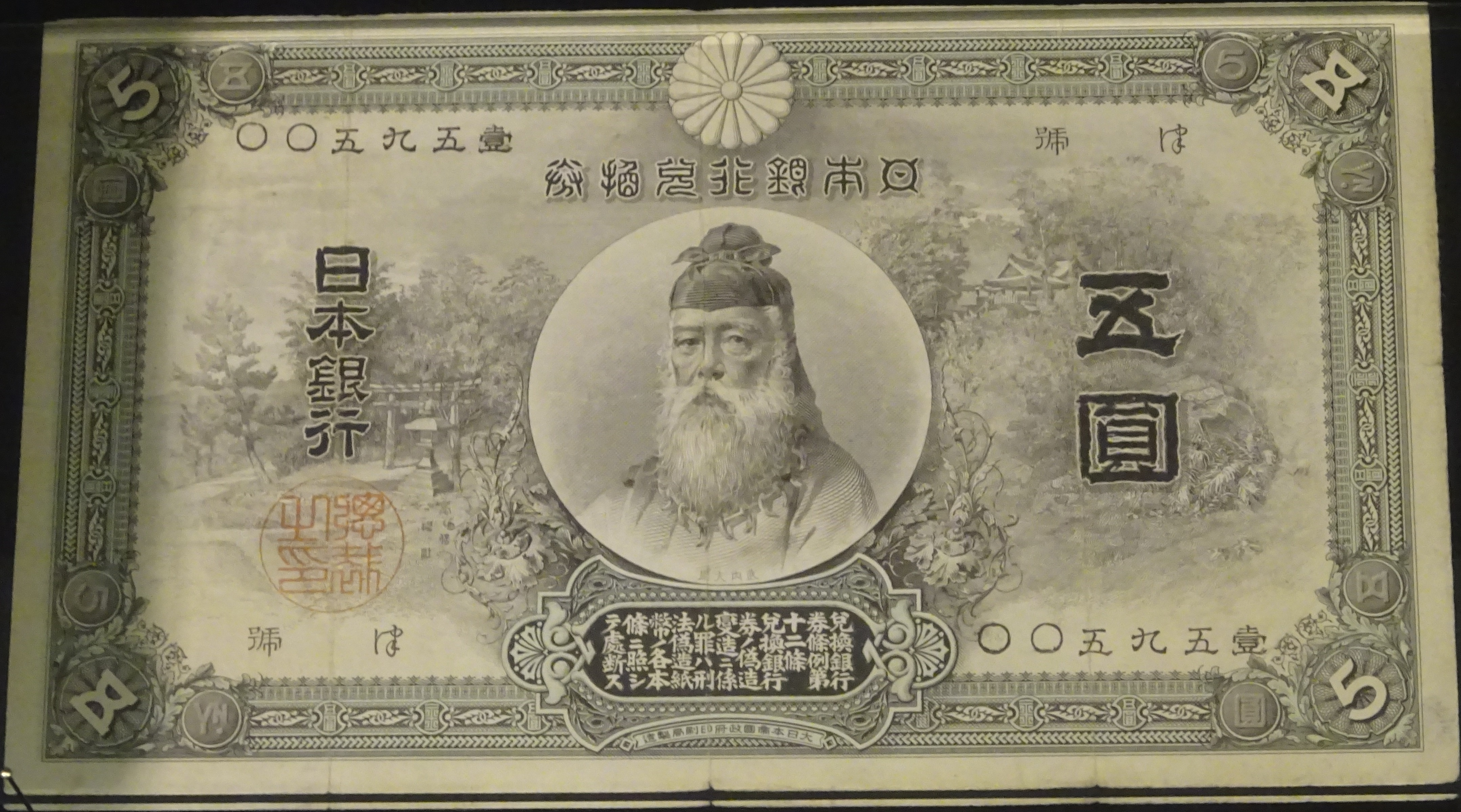
5-Yen banknote with Takenouchi no Sukune and Ube Jinja

The origins of Ube Jinja are unknown. Although there is no documentary evidence, it is believed that it began as the family shrine for the Ifubuki clan of the Kofun period, who were the kuni no miyatsuko of Inaba, and who possessed sacred Japanese swords given to them by Emperor Seimu. According to the Heian period Engishiki, during the reign of the legendary Emperor Nintoku, Takenouchi no Sukune, who was over 360 years old at the time, went missing in Kamekinzan on the hillside of Mt. Ube in Inaba. There are two monoliths behind the shrine, which are part of a kofun said to be Takenouchi no Sukune's burial mound. The shrine is located near the site of the kokufu (provincial capital) of Inaba, and numerous archaeological sites are in the vicinity.

The shrine has been rebuilt repeatedly. During the Muromachi period, the shrine gradually lost its estates and declined. In 1581, when Toyotomi Hideyoshi attacked Tottori Castle, the shrine was reduced to ashes. It was reconstructed in 1633 with the assistance of Ikeda Mitsunaka, the daimyō of Tottori Domain under the Tokugawa shogunate. During the Meiji era of State Shinto, the shrine was rated as a national shrine, 2nd rank The current shrine dates to 1898. The haiden of Ube Jinja is depicted on the 5-yen bank note in circulation from 1899 to 1934.

The position of kannushi at the shrine has been a hereditary position of the Ifubuki clan since ancient times. The composer Akira Ifukube is the grandson of a 65th-generation kannushi.

The shrine is located a 20-minute walk from Tottori Station on the JR West San'in Main Line.

== Gallery ==
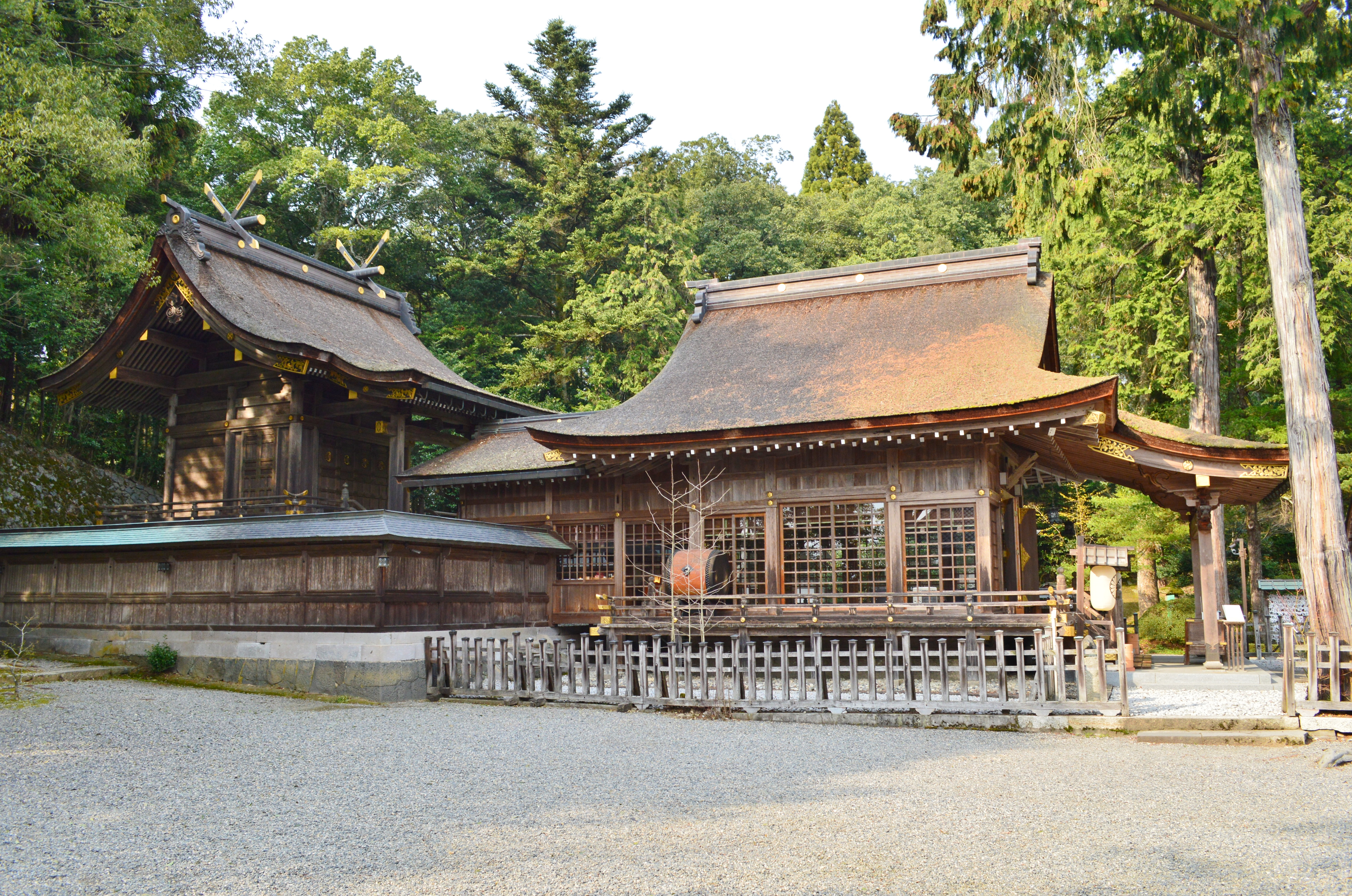
Precincts

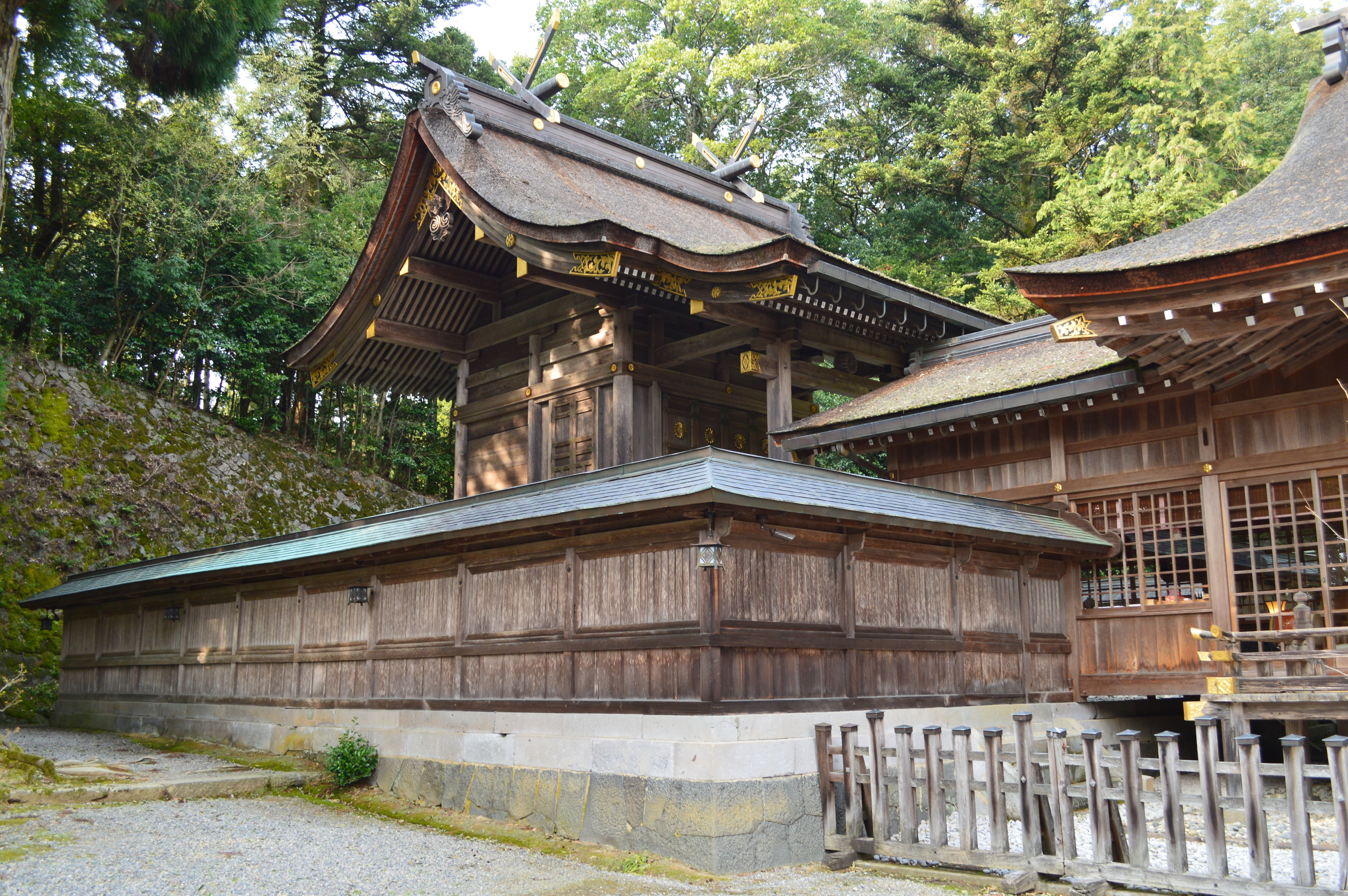
Honden

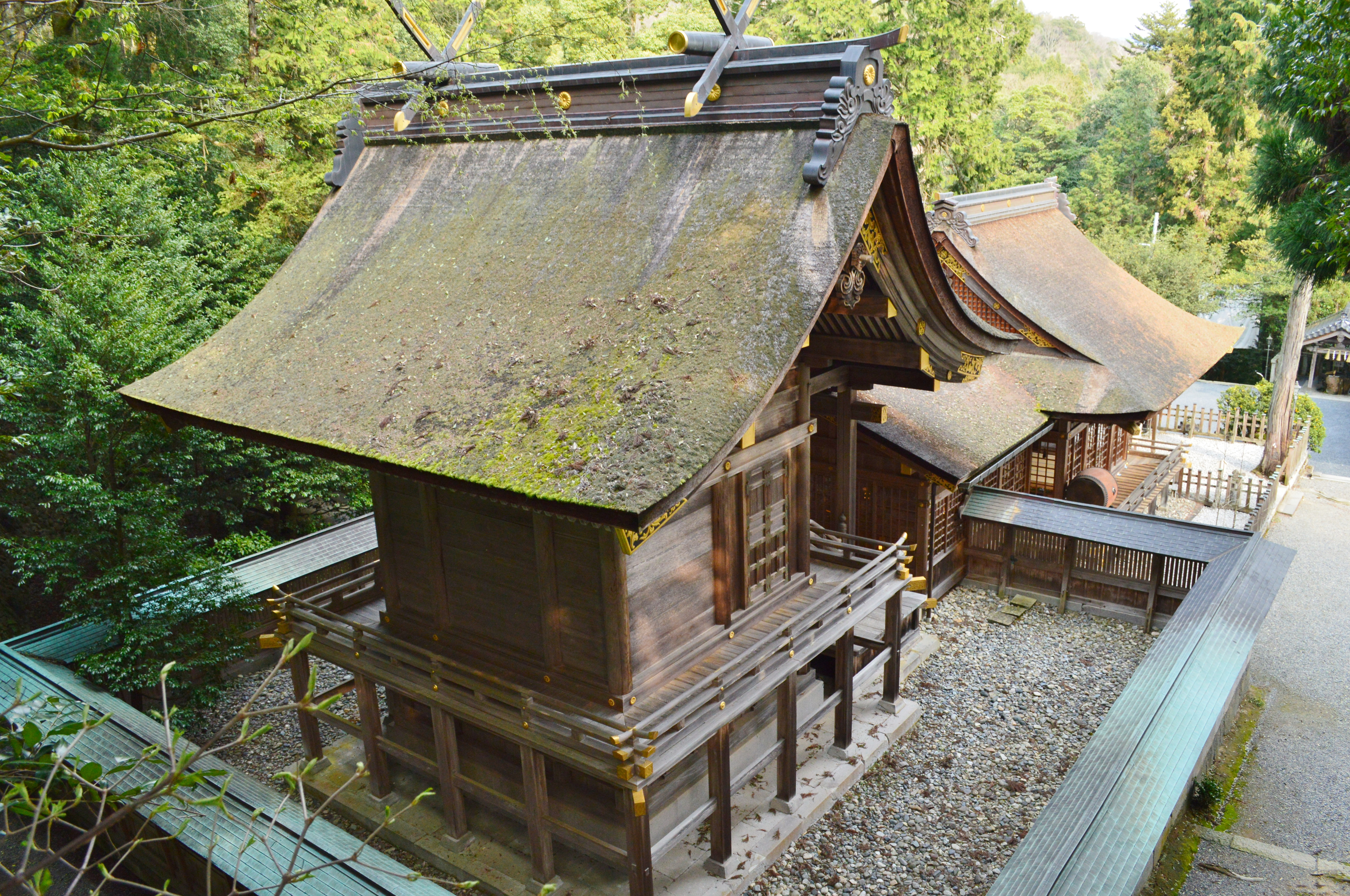
Honden (back side）

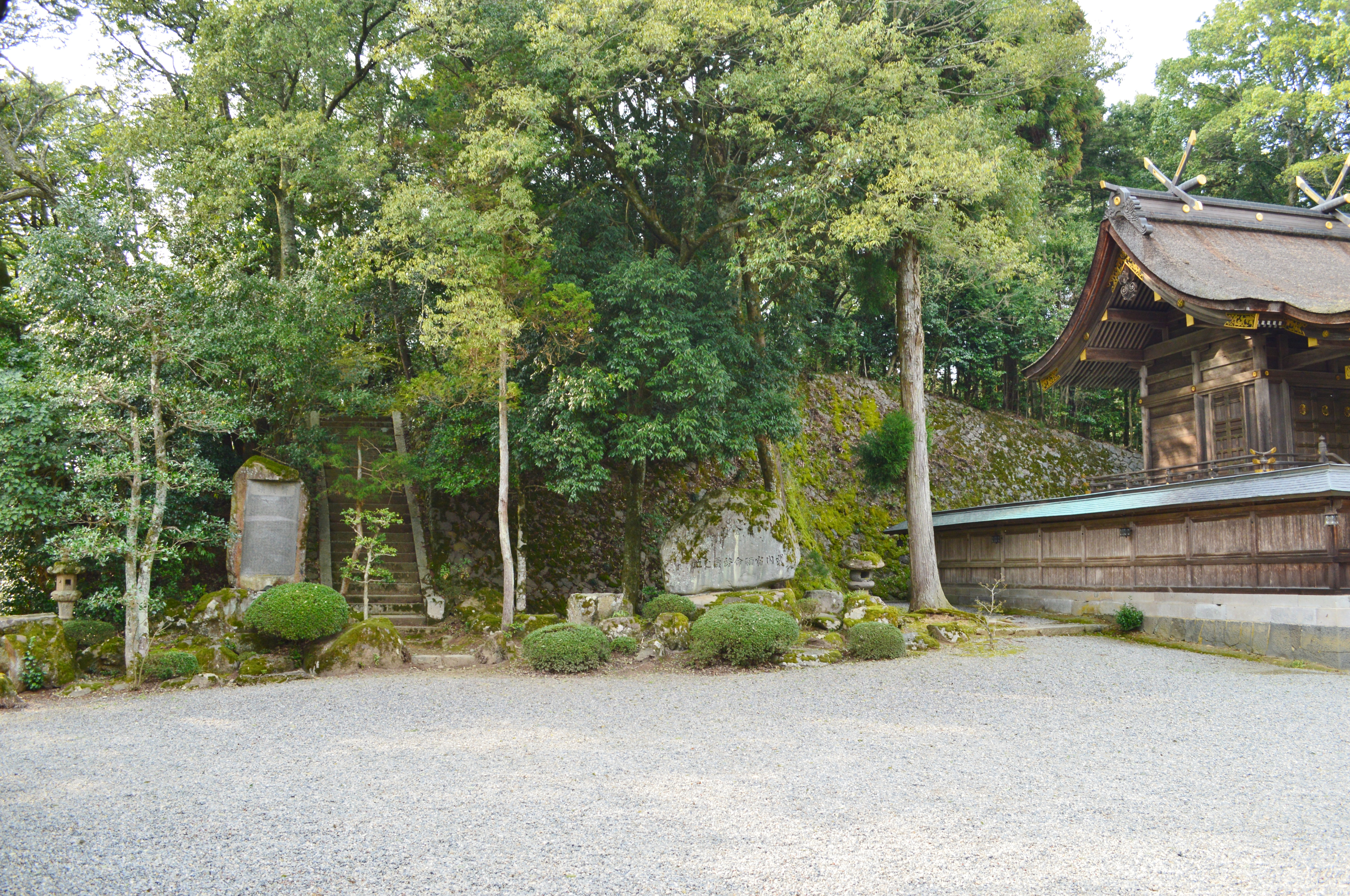
Kamegane no oka

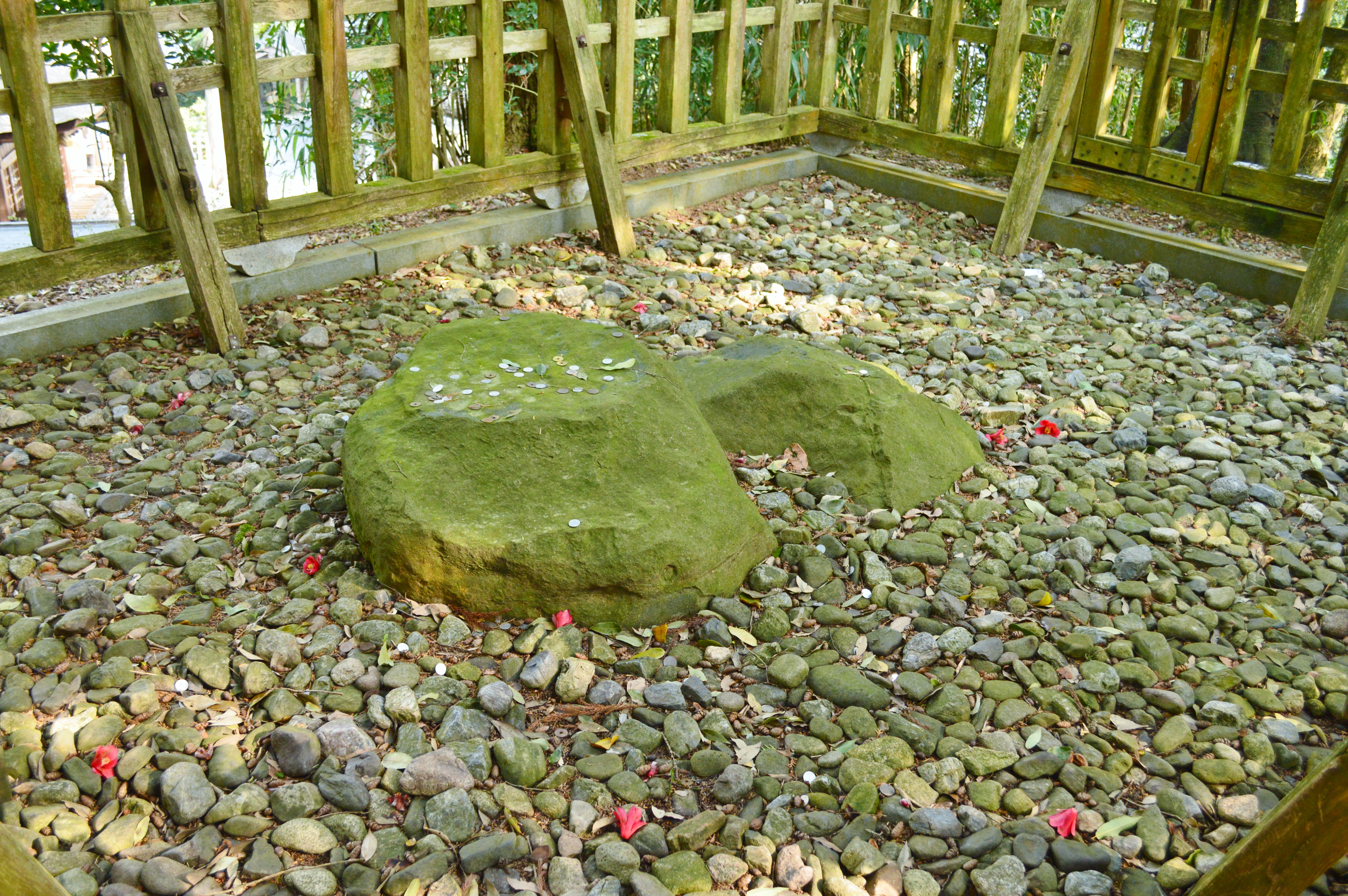
Kofun alleged to be grave of Takenouchi no Sukune

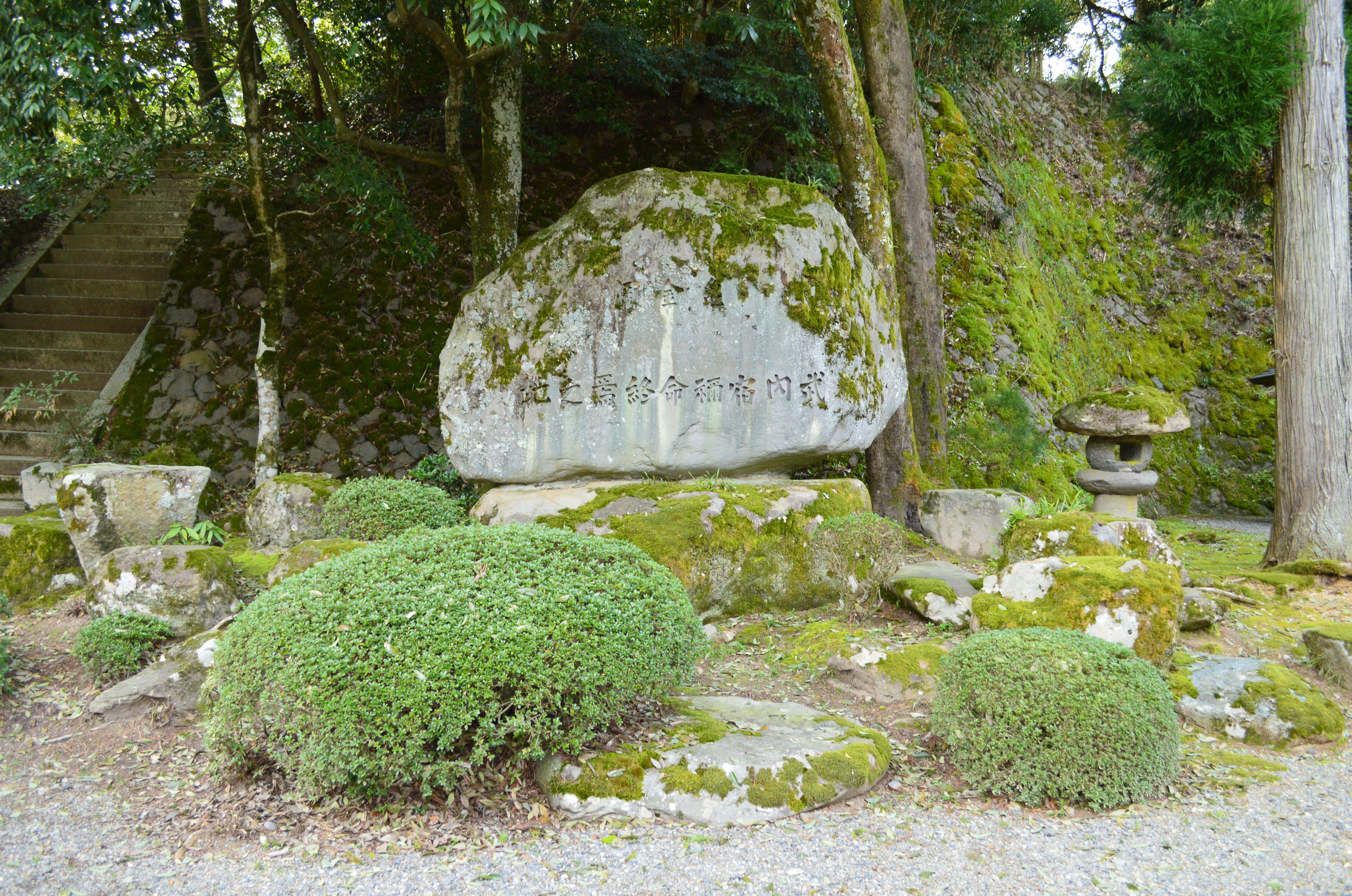
Centotaph to Takenouchi no Sukune

== See also ==
- List of Shinto shrines
- Ichinomiya
