= Japanese military currency =

Japanese military currency may refer to:

- Japanese military currency (1894–1918), issued during the Meiji and Taishō period
- Japanese military currency (1937–1945), issued during World War II
- Japanese invasion money, issued during World War II by the Japanese Military Authority
