= Kōyō Okada =

Japanese photographer

Kōyō Okada (岡田紅陽, Okada Kōyō; 1895–1972) was a Japanese photographer.
