= Goō Shrine =

Shinto Shrine in Kyoto city, Japan

- 護王神社 (Goō Jinja)
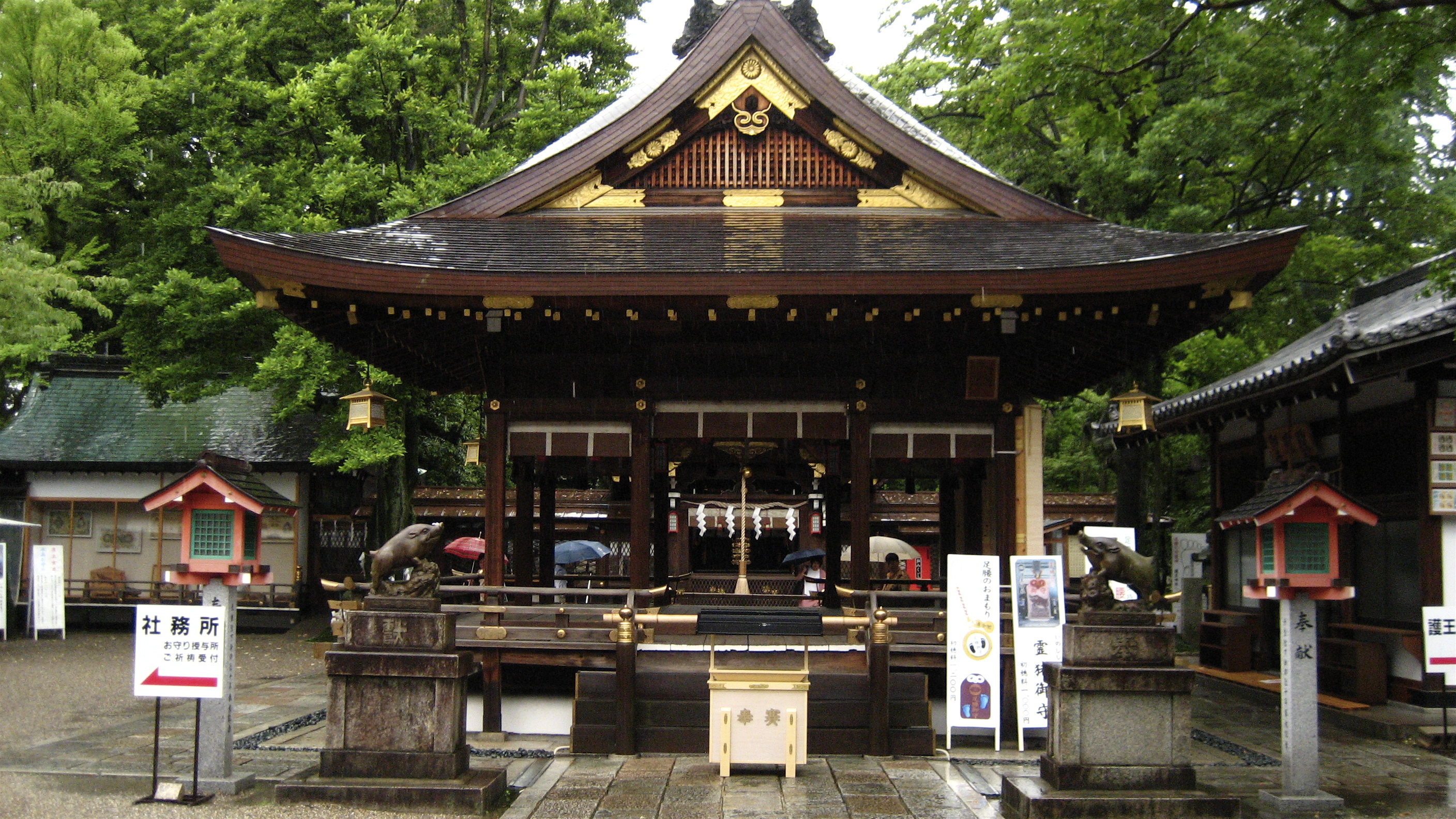

- Location within Japan

Religion
- Affiliation: Shinto
- Deity: Wake no Kiyomaro, Wake no Hiromushi

Location
- Location: 385 Okakuenchō, Shimochōjamachi Sagaru, Kamigyō-ku, Kyoto City, Kyoto Prefecture, JAPAN, 602-8011
- Interactive map of Goō Shrine
- Coordinates: 35°01′19″N 135°45′54″E

Website
- http://www.gooujinja.or.jp

Goō Shrine (護王神社 ごおうじんじゃ Goō Jinja) is a Shinto shrine located in the Kamigyō-ku district of Kyoto, Japan.

== History ==
The shrine began as a site to enshrine Wake no Kiyomaro, for its important contribution to the construction of the Heian-kyō. Originally it was located inside the grounds of the Takaosan Jingoji temple, but in 1886 by order of the Meiji Emperor, it was relocated to its current location on the west side of the Kyoto Imperial Palace.

== Present Day ==
Nowadays the Goō Shrine is a popular site frequented by people who come to pray for the recovery from lower-body injuries. This is due to a shrine legend that tells how during the travel on his way to exile to Usa, Wake no Kiyomaru was attacked and suffered a leg injury, but was saved by 300 wild boars that saved him and protected him until the end of his journey.

For this reason, the Shrine is also known as the ''Wild Boar Shrine" and has statues of boars instead of the traditional komainu statues seen at Shinto Shrines.

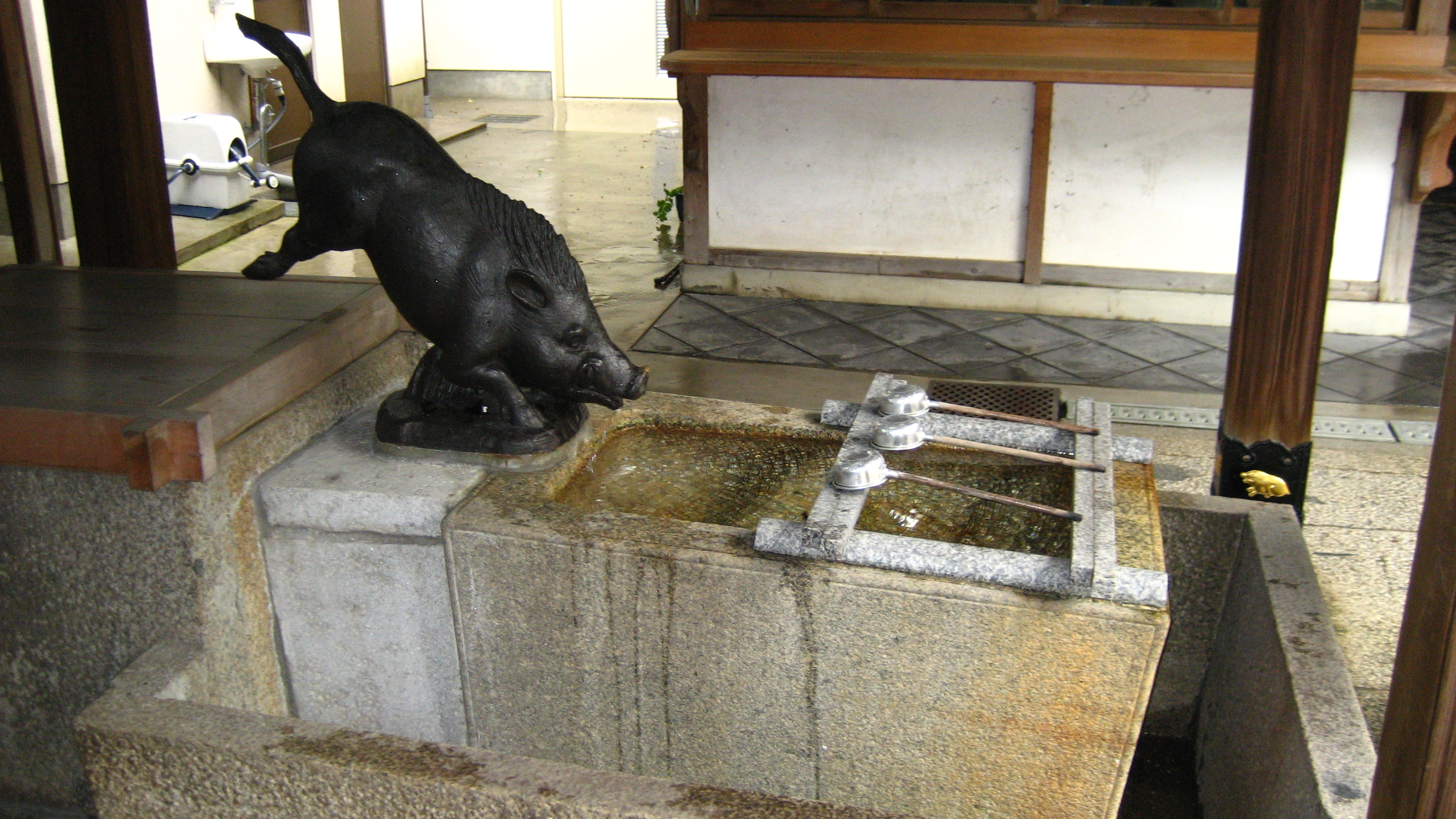
Wild boar statue at the Shrine.

The shrine is also known as a place to pray for the well-being of children and child rearing, as Wake no Kiyomaru's sister, Wake no Hiromushi, is said to have taken care of 83 children who lost their families due to war. Wake no Hiromushi is also enshrined at the site as a child-rearing deity.

== Around the Shrine ==
- Kyoto Imperial Palace
- Sugawarain Tenmangū Shrine
