= Economic relations of Japan =

In its economic relations, Japan is both a major trading nation and one of the largest international investors in the world. In many respects, international trade is the lifeblood of Japan's economy. Imports and exports totaling the equivalent of nearly US$1.309.2 Trillion in 2017, which meant that Japan was the world's fourth largest trading nation after China, the United States and Germany. Trade was once the primary form of Japan's international economic relationships, but in the 1980s its rapidly rising foreign investments added a new and increasingly important dimension, broadening the horizons of Japanese businesses and giving Japan new world prominence.

== Postwar development ==
Japan's international economic relations in the first three decades after World War II were shaped largely by two factors: a relative lack of domestic raw materials and a determination to catch up with the industrial nations of the West. Its exports have consisted exclusively of manufactured goods, and raw materials have represented a large share of its imports. The country's sense of dependency and vulnerability has also been strong because of its lack of raw materials. Japan's determination to catch up with the West encouraged policies to move away from simple labor-intensive exports toward more sophisticated export products (from textiles in the 1950s to automobiles and consumer electronics in the 1980s) and to pursue protectionist policies to limit foreign competition for domestic industries.

After the end of World War II, Japan's economy was in a shambles, with production in 1945 at 10% of prewar levels. Its international economic relations were almost completely disrupted. Initially, imports were limited to essential food and raw materials, mostly financed by economic assistance from the United States. Because of extreme domestic shortages, exports did not begin to recover until the Korean War (1950–53), when special procurement by United States armed forces created boom conditions in indigenous industries. By 1954 economic recovery and rehabilitation were essentially complete. For much of the 1950s, however, Japan had difficulty exporting as much as it imported, leading to chronic trade and current account deficits. Keeping these deficits under control, so that Japan would not be forced to devalue its currency under the Bretton Woods system of fixed exchange rates that prevailed at the time, was a primary concern of government officials. Stiff quotas and tariffs on imports were part of the policy response. By 1960 Japan accounted for 3.6 percent of all exports of noncommunist countries.

=== 1960s ===
During the 1960s, the U.S. dollar value of exports grew at an average annual rate of 16.9 percent, more than 75 percent faster than the average rate of all noncommunist countries. By 1970 exports had risen to nearly 6.9 percent of all noncommunist-world exports. The rapid productivity growth in manufacturing industries made Japanese products more competitive in world markets at the fixed exchange rate for the yen during the decade, and the chronic deficits that the nation faced in the 1950s had disappeared by the middle of the 1970s. International pressure to dismantle quota and tariff barriers mounted, and Japan began moving in this direction. The pressure also allowed the United States to grow even further economically.

=== 1970s ===
The 1970s began with the end of the fixed exchange rate for the yen (a change brought about mainly by rapidly rising Japanese trade and current account surpluses) and with a strong rise in the value of the yen under the new system of floating rates. The sense of dependence on imported raw materials grew strong, when crude petroleum and other material prices rose during the 1973 oil crisis and supply was uncertain. Japan faced sharply higher bills for imports of energy and other raw materials. The new exchange rates and the rise in raw material prices meant that the surpluses of the decade's beginning were lost, and large trade deficits followed in the wake of the second oil price shock in 1979. Expanding the country's exports remained a priority in the face of these raw material supply shocks, and during the decade exports continued to expand at a high annual average rate of 21 percent.

=== 1980s ===
During the 1980s, however, raw material prices fell and the feeling of vulnerability lessened. The 1980s also brought rapidly rising trade surpluses, so that Japan could export far more than was needed to balance its imports. In response to these surpluses, the value of the yen rose against that of other currencies in the last half of the decade, but the surpluses proved surprisingly resilient to this change. With these developments, some of the resistance to manufactured imports, long considered luxuries in the relative absence of raw materials, began to dissipate. Japan had caught up. Now an advanced industrial nation, it faced new changes in its economy, on both domestic and international fronts, including demands to supply more foreign aid and to open its markets for imports. It had become a leader in the international economic system through its success in certain export markets, its leading technologies, and its growth as a major investor around the world. These were epochal changes for Japan, after a century in which the main national motivation was to catch up with the West. These dramatic changes also fed domestic developments that were lessening the society's insularity and parochialism. The large surpluses, combined with foreign perceptions that Japan's import markets were still relatively closed, exacerbated tension between Japan and a number of its principal trading partners, especially the United States. A rapid increase in imports of manufactured goods after 1987 eased some of these tensions, but as the decade ended, friction still continued.

The processes through which Japan is becoming a key member of the international economic community continued into the 1990s. Productivity continued to grow at a healthy pace, the country's international leadership in a number of industries remained unquestioned, and investments abroad continued to expand. Pressures were likely to lead to further openness to imports, increased aid to foreign countries, and involvement in the running of major international institutions, such as the International Monetary Fund (IMF). As Japan achieved a more prominent international position during the 1980s, it also generated considerable tension with its trade partners, especially with the United States, although these have dissipated more recently as the growth of Japan's economy has slowed. The largest blow to these trade tensions was Japan's prolonged economic crisis in the 1990s known as the Lost Decade.

== Foreign investment ==
Through most of the postwar period foreign investment was not a significant part of Japan's external economic relations. Both domestic and foreign investments were carefully controlled by government regulations, which kept the investment flows small. These controls applied to direct investment in the creation of subsidiaries under the control of a parent company, portfolio investment, and lending. Controls were motivated by the desire to prevent foreigners (mainly Americans) from gaining ownership of the economy when Japan was in a weak position after World War II, and by concerns over the balance of payments deficits. Beginning in the late 1960s, these controls were gradually loosened, and the process of deregulation accelerated and continued throughout the 1980s. The result was a dramatic increase in capital movements, with the biggest change occurring in outflows—investments by Japanese in other countries. By the end of the 1980s, Japan had become a major international investor. Because the country was a newcomer to the world of overseas investment, this development led to new forms of tension with other countries, including criticism of highly visible Japanese acquisitions in the United States and elsewhere.

== Relations by region ==
=== Asia ===
The developing nations of Asia grew very rapidly as suppliers to and buyers from Japan. In 1990 these sources (including South Korea, Taiwan, Hong Kong, Singapore, Indonesia, and other countries in Southeast Asia) accounted for 28.8 percent of Japan's exports, a share well below the 34 percent value of 1960 but one that had been roughly constant since 1970. In 1990 developing Asian countries provided 23 percent of Japan's imports, a share that had risen slowly from 16 percent in 1970.

As a whole, Japan had run a surplus with noncommunist Asia, and this surplus rose quickly in the 1980s. From a minor deficit in 1980 of US$841 million (mostly caused by a peak in the value of oil imports from Indonesia), Japan showed a surplus of nearly US$3 billion with these countries in 1985 and of over US$228 billion in 1990. The shift was caused by the fall in the prices of oil and other raw materials that Japan imported from the region and by the rapid growth in Japanese exports as the region's economic growth continued at a high rate.

Indonesia and Malaysia both continued to show a trade surplus because of their heavy raw material exports to Japan. However, falling oil prices caused trade in both directions between Japan and Indonesia to decline in the 1980s. Trade similarly declined with the Philippines, owing to the political turmoil and economic contraction there in the 1980s.

In 1990, South Korea, Taiwan, Hong Kong, and Singapore constituted the newly industrialized economies (NIEs) in Asia, and all four exhibited high economic growth during the 1970s and 1980s. Like Japan, they lacked many raw materials and mainly exported manufactured goods. Their deficits with Japan increased from 1980 to 1988, when the deficits of all four were sizeable. Over the 1970s and 1980s, they evolved a pattern of importing components from Japan and exporting assembled products to the United States.

Japan's direct investment in Asia also expanded with the total cumulative value reaching over US$32 billion by 1988. Indonesia, at US$9.8 billion in 1988, was the largest single location for these investments. As rapid as the growth of investment was, however, it did not keep pace with Japan's global investment, so Asia 's share in total cumulative investment slipped, from 26.5 percent in 1975 to 17.3 percent in 1988.

China is now Japan's largest export market, surpassing the U.S. despite a drop in overall trade, according to recent figures from the Japan External Trade Organization. Japan's exports to China fell 25.3% during the first half of 2009 to $46.5 billion, but due to a steeper drop in shipments to the U.S., China became Japan's largest trade destination for the first time. China is also Japan's largest source of imports.

=== Middle East ===
The importance of the Middle East expanded dramatically in the 1970s with the jumps in crude oil prices. The 1973 oil crisis put a break to the high rates of economic growth Japan enjoyed in the 1960s, and Japan was deeply concerned with maintaining good relations with these oil-producing nations to avoid a debilitating cut in oil supplies. During the 1980s, however, oil prices fell and Japan's concerns over the security of its oil supply diminished greatly. Still, measures were taken to reduce Japanese dependency on oil as energy source. After the end of the Cold War, Japan tried to win Russia as another source of oil, but so far Japanese–Russian relations remain tense because of territorial disputes. Other oil sources include Indonesia and Venezuela.

The Middle East represented only 7.5 percent of total Japanese imports in 1960 and 12.4 percent in 1970, with the small rise resulting from the rapid increase in the volume of oil consumed by the growing Japanese economy. By 1980, however, this share had climbed to a peak of 31.7 percent because of the two rounds of price hikes in the 1970s. Falling oil prices after 1980 brought this share back down to 10.5 percent by 1988—actually a lower percentage than in 1970, before the price hikes had started. The major oil suppliers to Japan in 1988 were Saudi Arabia and the United Arab Emirates. Iran, Iraq, and Kuwait were also significant, but smaller, sources. These three countries became less important oil suppliers after 1980 because of the Iran–Iraq War (1980–1988), Iraq's invasion of Kuwait in 1990, UN sanctions and the 2003 US invasion of Iraq.

As imports from the Middle East surged in the 1970s, so did Japan's exports to the region. Paralleling the pattern for imports, however, this share fell in the 1980s. Amounting to 1.8 percent in 1960, exports to this region rose to 11.1 percent of total Japanese exports in 1980 but then declined to 3.6 percent by 1988.

Part of Japan's strategy to ensure oil supplies is to encourage investment in oil-supplying countries. However, such investment have never kept pace with Japan's investments in other regions. The country's expanding need for oil helped push direct investment in the Middle East to 9.3 percent of total direct investments abroad by Japanese companies in 1970, but this share had fallen to 6.2 percent by 1980 and to only 1.8 percent by 1988. The Iran–Iraq War (1980–88) was a major factor in the declining interest of Japanese investors, exemplified by the fate of a large US$3 billion petrochemical complex in Iran, which was almost complete when the Islamic revolution took place in Iran in 1979. Completion was delayed first by political concerns (when United States embassy personnel were held hostage) and then by repeated Iraqi bombing raids. The project was finally canceled in 1989, with losses for both Japanese companies and the Japanese government, which had provided insurance for the project.

In the 1990s and beyond, Japan’s engagement with the Middle East extended beyond oil, as the nation increasingly turned to Liquefied Natural Gas (LNG) as a cleaner and more efficient energy source. Japan became a key market for LNG exports from countries like Qatar, the UAE, and Oman. The first LNG purchase agreement between Japan and Qatar was signed in 1992, and the inaugural shipment arrived in 1997, marking the beginning of a strategic partnership in the energy sector. By 2021, Qatar had become one of Japan’s largest LNG suppliers. This relationship reflects Japan’s broader strategy to diversify its energy mix and secure stable supplies while fostering interdependence through technology transfer and investment in the region. Furthermore, Japanese companies have played significant roles as stakeholders in LNG projects, solidifying economic and technological ties with Middle Eastern countries and contributing to regional development. Beyond this, in the 1990s, urbanization in several Gulf states, especially Dubai, led to a number of profitable contracts for Japanese construction companies.

=== Western Europe ===
Japan's trade with Western Europe grew steadily but had been relatively small well into the 1980s considering the size of this market. In 1980 Western Europe supplied only 7.4 percent of Japan's imports and took 16.6 percent of its exports. However, the relationship began to change very rapidly after 1985. West European exports to Japan increased two and one-half times in just the three years from 1985 to 1988 and rose as a share of all Japanese imports to 16 percent. (Much of this increase came from growing Japanese interest in West European consumer items, including luxury automobiles.) Likewise, Japan's exports to Western Europe rose rapidly after 1985, more than doubling by 1988 and accounting for 21 percent of all Japan's exports. By 1990 Western Europe's share of Japan's imports had risen to 18 percent and the share of Japan's exports that it received had risen to 22 percent.

In 1990 the major European buyers of Japanese exports were West Germany (US$17.7 billion) and Britain (US$10.7 billion). The largest European suppliers to Japan were West Germany (US$11.5 billion), France (US$7.6 billion), and Britain (US$5.2 billion). Traditionally, West European countries had trade deficits with Japan, and this continued to be the case in 1988, despite the surge in Japan's imports from them after 1985. From 1980 to 1988, the deficit of the West European countries as a whole expanded from US$11 billion to US$25 billion, with much of the increase coming after 1985. That diminished somewhat to US$20.7 billion in 1990, before rising sharply to US$34 billion in 1992.

Trade relations with Western Europe were strained during the 1980s. Policies varied among the individual countries, but many imposed restrictions on Japanese imports. Late in the decade, as discussions proceeded on the trade and investment policies that were expected to prevail with European economic integration in 1992, many Japanese officials and business people became concerned that protectionism directed against Japan would increase. Domestic content requirements (specifying the share of local products and value added in a product) and requirements on the location of research and development facilities and manufacturing investments appeared likely.

Fear of a protectionist Western Europe accelerated Japanese direct investment in the second half of the 1980s. Total accumulated Japanese direct investments in the region grew from US$4.5 billion in 1980 to over US$30 billion in 1988, from 12.2 percent to more than 16 percent of such Japanese investments. Rather than being discouraged by protectionist signals from Europe, Japanese businesses appeared to be determined to play a significant role in what promises to be a large, vigorous, and integrated market. Investment offered the surest means of circumventing protectionism, and Japanese business appeared to be willing to comply with whatever domestic content or other performance requirements the European Union might impose.

=== Latin America ===
In the 1970s, Japan briefly showed enthusiasm over Brazilian prospects. A vast territory richly endowed with raw materials and with a sizable Japanese-Brazilian minority in the population, Brazil appeared to Japanese business to offer great opportunities for trade and investment. However, none of those expectations have been realized, and Japanese financial institutions became caught up in the international debt problems of Brazil and other Latin American countries.

In 1990 Japan received US$9.8 billion of imports from Latin America as a whole and exported US$10.2 billion to the region, for a surplus of US$429 million. Although the absolute value of both exports and imports had grown over time, Latin America had declined in importance as a Japanese trading partner. The share of Japan's total imports coming from this region dropped from 7.3 percent in 1970 to 4.1 percent in 1980, remaining at 4.2 percent in 1990. Japan's exports to Latin America also declined, from 6.9 percent in 1980 to 3.6 percent in 1990.

Despite this relative decline in trade, Japan's direct investment in the region continued to grow quickly, reaching US$31.6 billion in 1988, or 16.9 percent of Japan's total foreign direct investment. This share was only slightly below that of 1975 (18.1 percent) and was almost equal to the share in Asian countries. However, over US$11 billion of this investment was in Panama—mainly for Panamanian-flag shipping, which does not represent true investment in the country. The Bahamas also attracted US$1.9 billion in investment, mainly from Japanese financial institutions but also in arrangements to secure favorable tax treatment rather than real investments. Brazil absorbed US$5 billion in Japanese direct investment, Mexico absorbed US$1.6 billion, and other Latin American countries absorbed amounts below US$1 billion in the late 1980s.

Latin American countries lie at the heart of the Third World debt problems that plagued international financial relations in the 1980s. Japanese financial institutions became involved as lenders to these nations, although they were far less exposed than United States banks. Because of this financial involvement, the Japanese government was actively involved in international discussions of how to resolve the crisis. In 1987 Minister of Finance Miyazawa Kiichi put forth a proposal on resolving the debt issue. Although that initiative did not go through, the Brady Plan that emerged in 1989 contained some elements of the Miyazawa Plan. The Japanese government supported the Brady Plan by pledging US$10 billion in cofinancing with the World Bank and the IMF.

Japan has signed a Free Trade Agreement with Mexico.

== International Trade and Development Institutions ==
Japan is a member of the United Nations (UN), the International Monetary Fund (IMF), the Organisation for Economic Co-operation and Development (OECD), and the General Agreement on Tariffs and Trade (GATT). It also participates in the international organizations focusing on economic development, including the World Bank and the Asian Development Bank.

As a member of the IMF and World Bank, for example, Japan played a role in the effort during the 1980s to address the international debt crisis brought on by the inability of certain developing countries to service their foreign debts as raw material prices fell and their economies stagnated. As a member of the IMF, Japan also cooperates with other countries in moderating the short-run volatility of the yen and participates in discussions on strengthening the international monetary system.

Japan's membership in the OECD has constrained its foreign economic policy to some extent. When Japan joined the OECD in 1966, it was obliged to agree to OECD principles on capital liberalization, an obligation that led Japan to begin the process of liberalizing its many tight controls on investment flows into and out of Japan. Japan is also a participant in the OECD's "gentlemen's agreement" on guidelines for government-supported export credits, which places a floor on interest rates and other terms for loans to developing countries from government-sponsored export-import banks.

GATT has provided the basic structure through which Japan has negotiated detailed international agreements on import and export policies. Although Japan had been a member of GATT since 1955, it retained reservations to some GATT articles, permitting it to keep in place stiff quota restrictions until the early 1960s. Japan took its GATT obligations seriously, however, and a number of American disputes with Japan over its import barriers were successfully resolved by obtaining GATT rulings, with which Japan complied. Japan also negotiated bilaterally with countries on economic matters of mutual interest.

The international organization with the strongest Japanese presence has been the Asian Development Bank, the multilateral lending agency established in 1966 that made soft loans to developing Asian countries. Japan and the United States have had the largest voting rights in the Asian Development Bank, and Japan has traditionally filled the presidency.

As Japan became a greater international financial power in the 1980s, its role in financing these trade and development institutions grew. Previously, the government had been a quiet participant in these organizations, but as its financial role increased, pressure to expand voting rights and play a more active policy role mounted.

By the early 1990s, Japan's influence and voting rights in the World Bank and IMF and other multilateral development banks increased. Japan's financial and policy positions become more prominent. Tokyo had assumed a leading role at the Asian Development Bank for a number of years. At the World Bank, Japan's voting share represented about 9.4 percent, compared with 16.3 percent for the United States. Japan also made several "special" contributions to particular World Bank programs that raised its financial status but did not alter its voting position. Japan planned to participate in the East European Development Bank, making a contribution of 8.5 percent, the same as the United States and major West European donors. Japan also displayed a growing prominence in IMF deliberations, helping ease the massive debt burdens of developing countries, and generally supported efforts in the early 1990s at the GATT Uruguay Round of trade negotiations to liberalize world trade and investment.

== List of the largest trading partners of Japan ==
These figures do not include services or foreign direct investment, but only trade in goods. The fifteen largest Japanese trading partners with their total trade (sum of imports and exports) in billions of US Dollars for calendar year 2017 are as follows:

Rank	Country/District	Exports	Imports	Total Trade	Trade Balance
-	World	697.2	670.9	1,368.1	
1	China	132.651	164.256	296.907	-31.605
-	ASEAN	105.719	102.773	208.492	2.946
2	United States	134.595	72.038	206.633	62.557
-	European Union	77.108	77.984	155.092	-0.876
3	South Korea	53.206	28.060	81.266	25.146
4	Taiwan	40.588	25.360	65.948	15.228
5	Australia	15.993	38.865	54.858	-22.872
6	Thailand	29.395	22.706	52.101	6.689
7	Germany	18.923	23.406	42.329	-4.483
8	Hong Kong	35.399	1.713	37.112	33.686
9	Vietnam	15.038	18.511	33.549	-3.473
10	Indonesia	13.378	19.854	33.232	-6.476
11	Malaysia	12.745	19.235	31.98	-6.49
12	Singapore	22.611	8.517	31.128	14.094
13	United Arab Emirates	7.202	20.722	27.924	-13.52
—	CIS	7.279	15.763	23.042	-8.484
14	Philippines	11.114	9.762	20.876	1.352
15	United Kingdom	13.710	7.061	20.771	6.649

Japan is also the dominant export partner of the following:

Exports
Region	Percentage
Brunei	36.5%
French Polynesia	22.2%
Philippines	20.8%
Qatar	20.0%

== See also ==
- Ministry of International Trade and Industry
- JETRO
- Foreign aid institutions of Japan

== Bibliography ==
- Choate, Pat, "Agents of Influence", New York: Simon & Schuster, 1991.
