= Japanese yen =

Currency of Japan

日本円 (Japanese)
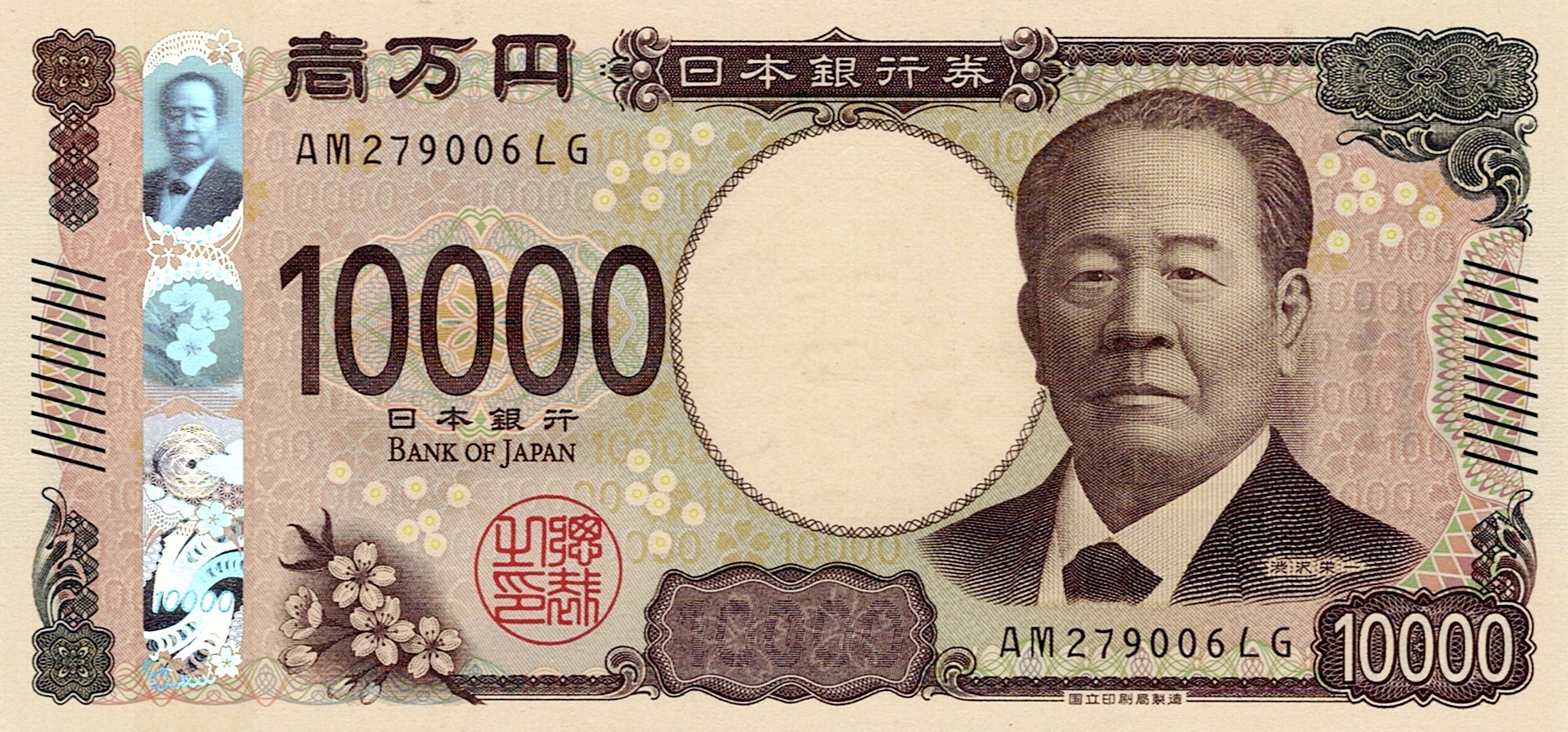
Series F ¥10,000 banknote
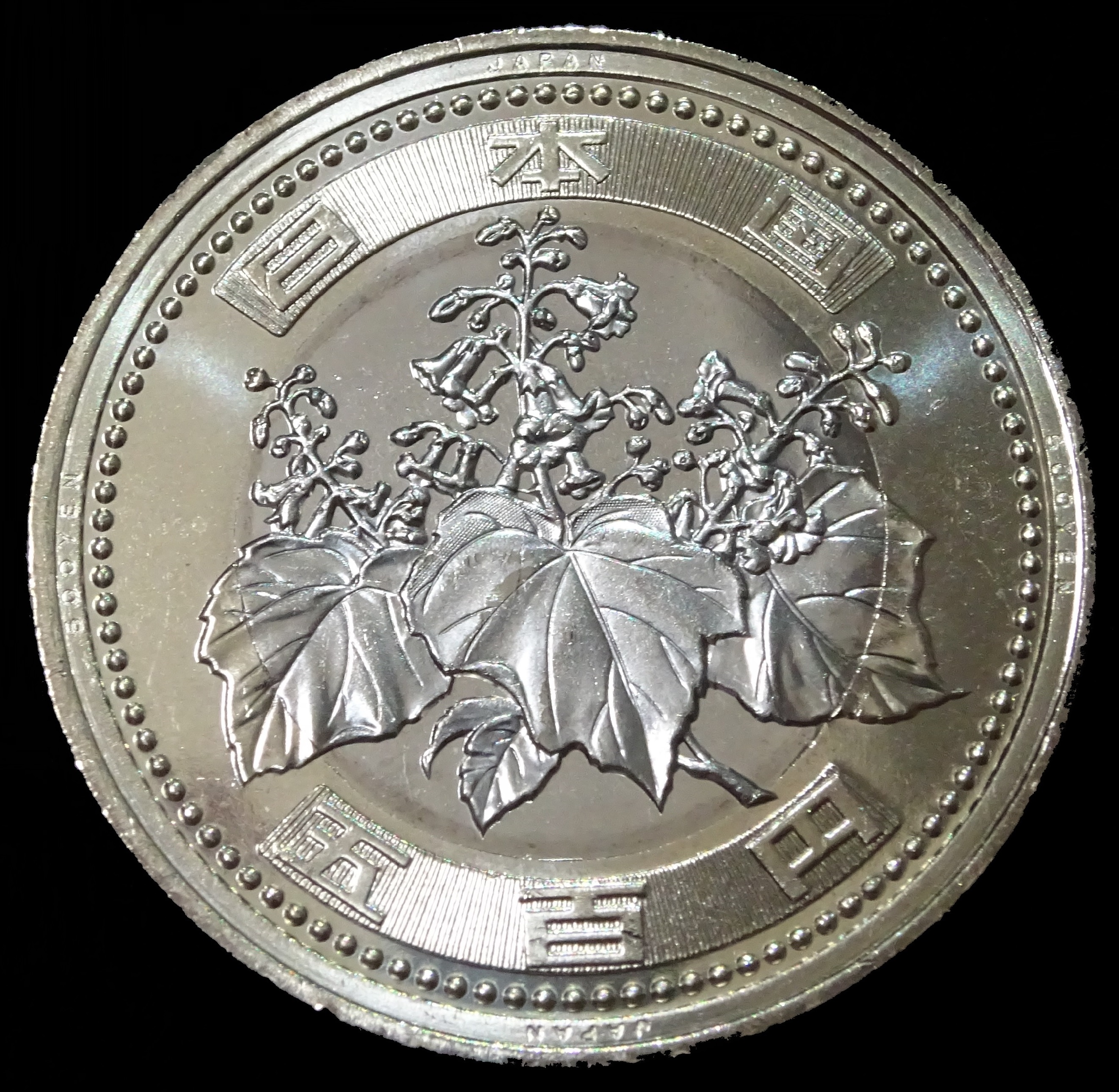
Bi-metallic ¥500 coin (obverse)

ISO 4217
- Code: JPY (numeric: 392)

Units of account
- Base unit: yen (円)
- Plural: The language(s) of this currency do(es) not have a morphological plural distinction.
- Symbol: ¥

Denominations
- Banknotes
- Freq. used: ¥1,000, ¥5,000, ¥10,000
- Rarely used: ¥2,000
- Coins: ¥1, ¥5, ¥10, ¥50, ¥100, ¥500

Demographics
- User(s): Japan

Issuance
- Central bank: Bank of Japan
- Website: boj.or.jp
- Printer: National Printing Bureau
- Website: npb.go.jp
- Mint: Japan Mint
- Website: mint.go.jp

Valuation
- Inflation: 2.3% (October 2026)
- Source: Statistics Bureau of Japan

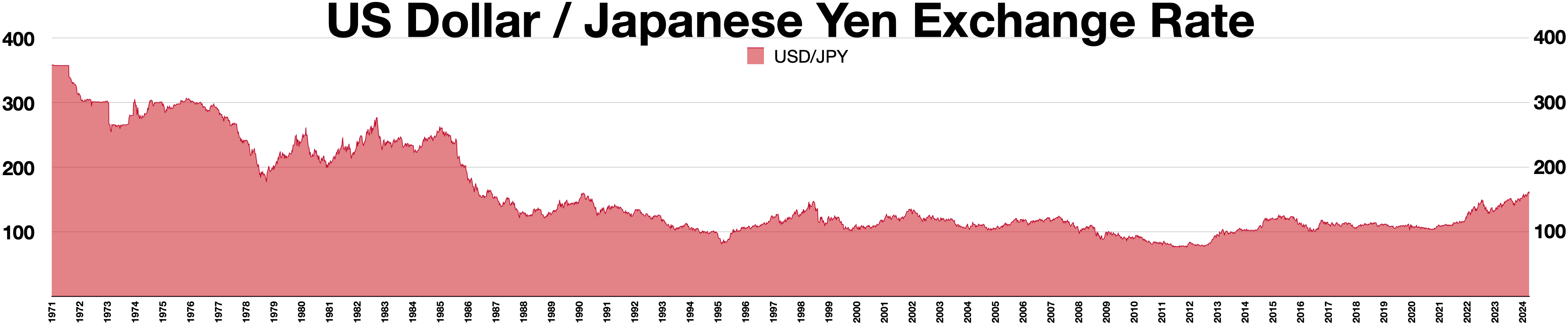
USD/JPY exchange rate 1971–2024

The yen (Japanese: 円; symbol: ¥; code: JPY) is the official currency of Japan. It is the third-most traded currency in the foreign exchange market, after the United States dollar (USD) and the euro. It is also widely used as a third reserve currency after the USD and the euro.

The New Currency Act of 1871 introduced Japan's modern currency system, with the yen defined as 1.5 g (0.048 troy ounces) of gold, or 24.26 g (0.780 troy ounces) of silver, and divided decimally into 100 sen or 1,000 rin. The yen replaced the previous Tokugawa coinage as well as the various hansatsu paper currencies issued by feudal han (fiefs). The Bank of Japan was founded in 1882 and given a monopoly on controlling the money supply.

Following World War II, the yen lost much of its pre-war value as Japan faced a debt crisis and hyperinflation. Under the Bretton Woods system, the yen was pegged to the USD alongside other major currencies. After this system was abandoned in 1971 with the Nixon shock, the short-lived Smithsonian Agreement temporarily reinstated a fixed exchange rate. However, since the end of that system in February 1973, the yen has been a floating currency.

The Ministry of Finance and the Bank of Japan have sometimes intervened in the currency market in recent years, to try to slow down exchange rate movements. There were intermittent interventions from 1998 to 2003 and from 2010 to 2011 to curb excessive and speculative appreciation of the yen, and again in 2022 and 2024 to slow down speculative selling of the currency. The first two interventions were coordinated with respective countries, and the IMF has repeatedly stated that Japan is "committed to a flexible exchange rate".

== Pronunciation and etymology ==
The name yen derives from the Japanese word 圓 (en; [eɴ]; lit. 'round'), which borrows its phonetic reading from Chinese yuan, similar to North Korean won and South Korean won. Originally, the Chinese had traded silver in mass called sycees, and when Spanish and Mexican silver coins arrived from the Philippines, the Chinese called them "silver rounds" (Chinese: 銀圓; pinyin: yínyuán) for their circular shapes. The coins and the name also appeared in Japan. While the Chinese eventually replaced 圆; 圓 with 元, (Note: 元; yuán is not a simplified form of 圆; 圓; yuán, but a completely different character. One of the reasons for replacements is said to be that the previous character had too many strokes. Both characters have the same pronunciation in Mandarin, but not in Japanese. In 1695, certain Japanese coins were issued whose surface has the character gen (元), but this is an abbreviation of the era name Genroku (元禄).) the Japanese continued to use the same word, which was given the shinjitai form 円 in reforms at the end of World War II.

The spelling and pronunciation "yen" is standard in English, because when Japan was first encountered by Europeans around the 16th century, Japanese /e/ (え) and /we/ (ゑ) were both pronounced [je]. Accordingly, Portuguese missionaries spelled them as "ye". (Note: It is known that in ancient Japanese there were distinct syllables /e/ /we/ /je/. From middle of the 10th century, /e/ (え) had merged with /je/, and both were pronounced [je], while a kana for /je/ had disappeared. Around the 13th century, /we/ (ゑ) and /e/ ceased to be distinguished (in pronunciation, but not in writing system) and both came to be pronounced [je].) By the middle of the 18th century, /e/ and /we/ came to be pronounced [e] as in modern Japanese, although some regions retain the [je] pronunciation. Walter Henry Medhurst, who had neither been to Japan nor met any Japanese people, having consulted mainly a Japanese-Dutch dictionary, spelled some "e"s as "ye" in his An English and Japanese, and Japanese and English Vocabulary (1830). In the early Meiji era, the U.S. physician and translator James Curtis Hepburn, following Medhurst, spelled all "e"s as "ye" in his A Japanese and English dictionary (1867); in Japanese, e and i are slightly palatalized, somewhat as in Russian. That was the first full-scale Japanese-English/English-Japanese dictionary, which had a strong influence on Westerners in Japan and probably prompted the spelling "yen", which appeared in the 2nd edition (1872). Hepburn revised most "ye"s to "e" in the 3rd edition (1886) to mirror the contemporary pronunciation, except "yen".

== History ==
=== Early history (1868–1876) ===
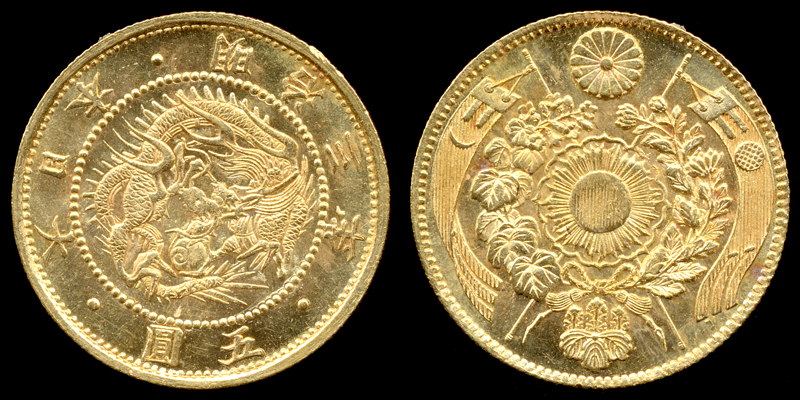
5 yen coin from 1870 (year 3)

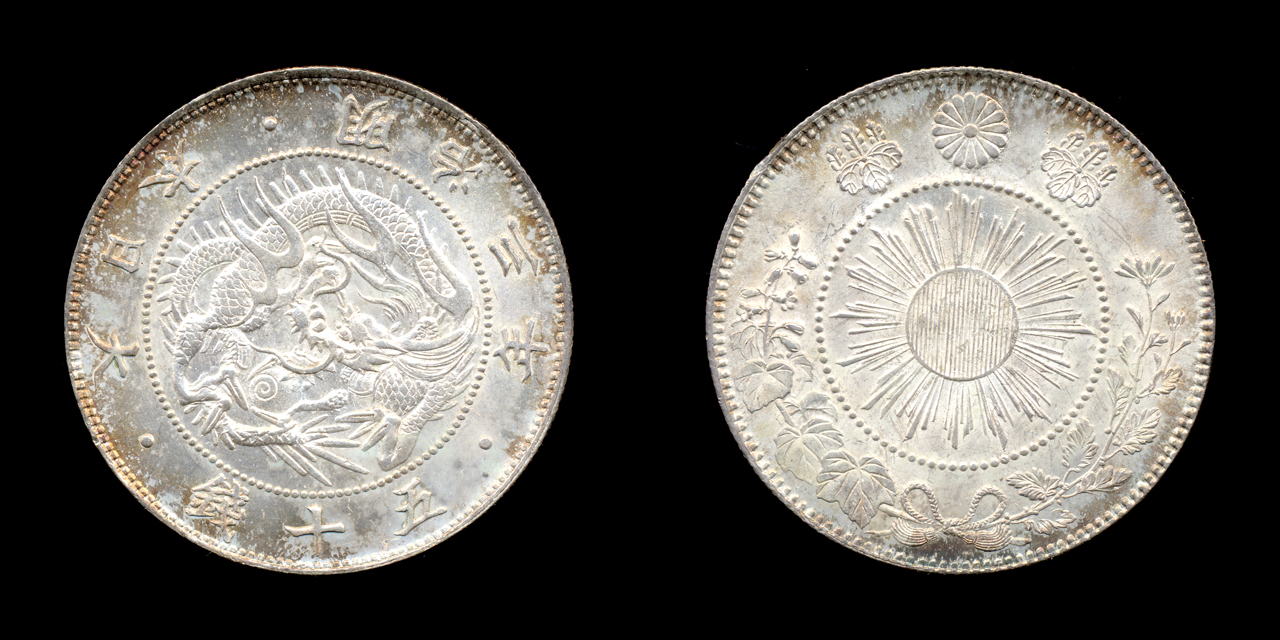
50 sen coin from 1870 (year 3)

Although the Edo Shogunate collapsed with the Meiji Restoration and a new government was born, there was no immediate change to the monetary system. During this unstable period, the confusion caused by this form of exchange caused economic turmoil. The gold (counting money) system of eastern Japan and the silver (weighing money) system of the western Japan were not unified, and the difference in the gold-silver ratio caused a large amount of gold to flow overseas at the end of the Tokugawa shogunate. Emperor Meiji responded to this by appointing Ōkuma Shigenobu as head of Japan's monetary reform program. He worked with Inoue Kaoru, Itō Hirobumi, and Shibusawa Eiichi to run the Ministry of Finance, seeking to introduce a modern monetary system into Japan. Ōkuma eventually proposed that coins, which were previously square, be made into circular discs, and that the names of the traditional currencies, ryō (両), bu (分) and shu (朱), be unified into yen (円), which was accepted by the government. Other rejected proposals included physical weight units of "Fun" and "Momme" which never made it past the pattern stage.

The first gold yen coins consisted of 2, 5, and 20 yen coins which were struck throughout 1870. Five yen coins were first struck in gold for the Japanese government in 1870 at the San Francisco Mint. During this time a new mint was being established at Osaka, but this did not receive the gold bullion needed for coinage until the following year. Gold bullion was delivered from private Japanese citizens, foreigners, and the Japanese government. Initially the government opted for silver, which would become the standard unit of value, leaving gold coinage as a subsidiary. While gold coinage could not be produced domestically in 1870, the mint at Osaka could produce silver coins, and these included denominations of 5, 10, 20, and 50 sen. None of these coins dated "1870" circulated until the Meiji government officially adopted the "yen" as Japan's modern unit of currency on 27 June 1871. This Act formally stipulated the adoption of the decimal accounting system of yen (1, 圓), sen (1/100, 錢), and rin (1/1000, 厘). The new currency was gradually introduced beginning from July of that year.

Japanese yen-denominated paper currency was also conceived with the coins in 1870, as Meiji Tsuho notes by Italian engraver Edoardo Chiossone. These were released as fiat currency in denominations of 1, 2, 5, 10, 50, and 100 yen along with subsidiary notes of 10, 20, and 50 sen in 1872. Almost concurrently, the government established a series of national banks modeled after the system in the United States, which issued national bank notes.

=== Satsuma Rebellion and aftermath (1877–1887) ===
Massive inflation from the Satsuma Rebellion in 1877 caused a glut of non-redeemable fiat currency notes. The issuance of national fiat banknotes was ultimately suspended in 1880 by then prime minister Matsukata Masayoshi. New policies were put into place which included the establishment of a centralized banking system.

The Bank of Japan began operations on 10 October 1882, with the authority to print banknotes that could be exchanged for the old Government and National Bank Notes. By May 1883, another act provided the redemption and retirement of national bank notes. The National Bank Act was amended again in March 1896, providing for the dissolution of the national banks on the expiration of their charters. This amendment also prohibited national bank notes from circulating after December 31, 1899. In that year, Japan adopted a gold exchange standard, defining the yen as 0.75g fine gold or US$0.4985.

This exchange rate remained in place until Japan left the gold standard in December 1931, after which the yen fell to US$0.30 by July 1932 and to US$0.20 by 1933.

It remained steady at around US$0.30 until the start of the Pacific War on 7 December 1941, at which time it fell to US$0.23.

The sen and the rin were eventually taken out of circulation at the end of 1953.

=== Fixed rate of the yen to the U.S. dollar ===
No true exchange rate existed for the yen between 7 December 1941 and 25 April 1949; wartime inflation reduced the yen to a fraction of its prewar value.

After a period of instability, on 25 April 1949, the U.S. occupation government fixed the value of the yen at ¥360/US$ through the Dodge plan, which was part of the Bretton Woods system, to stabilize prices in the Japanese economy.

That exchange rate was maintained until 1971, when the United States abandoned the gold standard, ending a key element of the Bretton Woods system, and setting in motion changes that eventually led to floating exchange rates in 1973.

=== Yen and major currencies float ===
By 1971, the yen had become undervalued. Japanese exports were costing too little in international markets, and imports from abroad were costing the Japanese too much. This undervaluation was reflected in the current account balance, which had risen from the deficits of the early 1960s, to a then-large surplus of US$5.8 billion in 1971. The belief that the yen, and several other major currencies, were undervalued motivated the United States' actions in 1971.

Following the United States' measures to devalue the USD in the summer of 1971, the Japanese government agreed to a new, fixed exchange rate as part of the Smithsonian Agreement, signed at the end of the year. This agreement set the exchange rate at ¥308/US$. However, the new fixed rates of the Smithsonian Agreement were difficult to maintain in the face of supply and demand pressures in the foreign-exchange market. In early 1973, the rates were abandoned, and the major nations of the world allowed their currencies to float.

=== Yen adoption in Okinawa ===
After World War II the U.S.-administered Okinawa issued a higher-valued currency called the B yen from 1946 to 1958, which was then replaced by the USD at the rate of US$1 = ¥120 B. Upon the reversion of Okinawa to Japan in 1972 the Japanese yen then replaced the USD. In light of the USD's reduction in value from ¥360 to ¥308 just before the reversion, an unannounced "currency confirmation" took place on 9 October 1971, wherein residents disclosed their USD holdings in cash and bank accounts; US$60 million were entitled to conversion in 1972 at the higher rate of ¥360.

=== Japanese government intervention in the currency market ===
In the 1970s, the Japanese government and business people were concerned that a rise in the value of the yen would hurt export growth by making Japanese products less competitive and would damage the industrial base. The government, therefore, continued to intervene heavily in foreign-exchange markets (buying or selling USDs), even after the 1973 decision to allow the yen to float.

Despite intervention, market pressures caused the yen to continue climbing in value, peaking temporarily at an average of ¥271/US$ in 1973, before the impact of the 1973 oil crisis was felt (this was retroactively called endaka, although the term was only coined in 1985). The increased costs of imported oil caused the yen to depreciate to a range of ¥290/US$ to ¥300/US$ between 1974 and 1976. The re-emergence of trade surpluses drove the yen back up to ¥211 in 1978. This currency strengthening was again reversed by the second oil shock in 1979, with the yen dropping to ¥227/US$ by 1980.

=== Yen in the early 1980s ===
During the first half of the 1980s, the yen failed to rise in value, though current account surpluses returned and grew quickly. From ¥221/US$ in 1981, the average value of the yen actually dropped to ¥239/US$ in 1985. The rise in the current account surplus generated stronger demand for yen in foreign-exchange markets, but this trade-related demand for yen was offset by other factors. A wide differential in interest rates, with United States interest rates much higher than those in Japan, and the continuing moves to deregulate the international flow of capital, led to a large net outflow of capital from Japan. This capital flow increased the supply of yen in foreign-exchange markets, as Japanese investors changed their yen for other currencies (mainly USDs) to invest overseas. This kept the yen weak relative to the USD and fostered the rapid rise in the Japanese trade surplus that took place in the 1980s.

=== Effect of the Plaza Accord ===

JPY nominal and real effective exchange rates (2005 = 100)

In 1985, a dramatic change began. Finance officials from major nations signed an agreement (the Plaza Accord) affirming that the USD was overvalued (and, therefore, the yen undervalued). This agreement, and shifting supply and demand pressures in the markets, led to a rapid rise in the value of the yen. From its average of ¥239/US$ in 1985, the yen rose to a peak of ¥128 in 1988, virtually doubling its value relative to the USD. After declining somewhat in 1989 and 1990, it reached a new high of ¥123/US$ in December 1992. In April 1995, the yen hit a peak of under 80 yen/US$, temporarily making Japan's economy nearly the size of that of the US.

=== Post-bubble years ===
The yen declined during the Japanese asset price bubble and continued to do so afterwards, reaching a low of ¥134 to USD in February 2002. The Bank of Japan's policy of zero interest rates has discouraged yen investments, with the carry trade of investors borrowing yen and investing in better-paying currencies (thus further pushing down the yen) estimated to be as large as US$1 trillion. In February 2007, The Economist estimated that the yen was 15% undervalued against the USD, and as much as 40% undervalued against the euro.

=== After the global economic crisis of 2008 ===
Comparison of the GNP-weighted nominal exchange rates: CHF and JPY versus CNY, EUR, USD, and GBP

However, this trend of depreciation reversed after the global economic crisis of 2008. Other major currencies, except the Swiss franc, have been declining relative to the yen.

On 4 April 2013, the Bank of Japan announced that they would expand their asset purchase program by US$1.4 trillion in two years. The Bank of Japan hopes to bring Japan from deflation to inflation, aiming for 2% inflation. The amount of purchases is so large that it is expected to double the money supply, but this move has sparked concerns that the authorities in Japan are deliberately devaluing the yen to boost exports. However, the commercial sector in Japan worried that the devaluation would trigger an increase in import prices, especially for energy and raw materials.

=== A period of rapid global inflation from 2022 onwards ===
Since 2022, the yen has depreciated significantly against its peers, due to a variety of factors. Firstly, Japan's prolonged low-interest-rate policy (to tackle domestic deflation) has created a yield differential with other countries—notably the US—that have high interest rates (to tackle domestic inflation), prompting investors to seek higher returns in foreign currencies. This interest rate differential directly affects the price of the yen and serves as one of the drivers behind its depreciation. Widely held expectations of yen depreciation can become self-fulfilling prophecies, affecting the currency's exchange rate. To counter this, the Bank of Japan conducted currency interventions of more than ¥9 trillion selling the USD and buying the yen in the September–October 2022 and April–May 2024 periods respectively.

=== Redenomination proposals ===
Numerous proposals have been made since the 1990s to redenominate the yen by introducing a new unit or new yen, equal to 100 yen, and nearly worth one USD. This has not happened to date, since the yen remains trusted globally despite its low unit value, and due to the large costs of reissuing new currency and updating currency-reading hardware. The negative impact of postponing upgrades to various computer software until redenomination occurs, in particular, was also cited.

== Coins ==
The Japan Mint has issued legal tender coins from 1871 to the present.

=== Circulating coinage ===
Coins being minted
Value	Image	Technical parameters				Description			Date of first minting
Value	Image	Diameter	Thickness	Mass	Composition	Edge	Obverse	Reverse	Date of first minting
¥1		20 mm	1.5 mm	1 g	100% aluminium	Smooth	Young tree, state title, value	Value, year of minting	1955
¥5		22 mm	1.5 mm	3.75 g	60–70% copper 30–40% zinc	Smooth	Ear of Rice, gear, water, value	State title, year of minting	1949 (rarely)
¥5		22 mm	1.5 mm	3.75 g	60–70% copper 30–40% zinc	Smooth	Ear of Rice, gear, water, value	State title, year of minting	1959
¥10		23.5 mm	1.5 mm	4.5 g	95% copper 3–4% zinc 1–2% tin	Reeded	Phoenix Hall, Byōdō-in, state title, value	Evergreen tree, value, year of minting	1951 (rarely)
¥10		23.5 mm	1.5 mm	4.5 g	95% copper 3–4% zinc 1–2% tin	Smooth	Phoenix Hall, Byōdō-in, state title, value	Evergreen tree, value, year of minting	1959
¥50		21 mm	1.7 mm	4 g	Cupronickel; 75% copper 25% nickel	Reeded	Chrysanthemum, state title, value	Value, year of minting	1967 (Note: Previously minted pure nickel 50 yen coins dated between 1955 and 1966 are still legal tender. These are rarely seen in circulation due to the price of nickel bullion.)
¥100		22.6 mm	1.7 mm	4.8 g	Cupronickel; 75% copper 25% nickel	Reeded	Cherry blossoms, state title, value	Value, year of minting	1967 (Note: Previously minted 100 yen silver coins dated between 1957 and 1966 are still legal tender. Silver was dropped from the coinage in 1967, which led to coin hoarding and silver smuggling outside of the country for melting. In light of this and their changed design, its unclear if these coins still circulate.)
¥500		26.5 mm	1.81 mm	7.1 g	Bi-metallic (75% copper 12.5% zinc 12.5% nickel)	Reeded helically	Paulownia, state title, value	Bamboo, Mandarin orange, Value, year of minting	2021 (Note: Two previous versions were not bi-metallic. The first, consisting of 75% copper and 25% nickel, was produced from 1982 to 2000. The second, consisting of 72% copper, 20% zinc, and 8% nickel, was produced beginning in 2000. Both remain in circulation.)
These images are to scale at 2.5 pixels per millimetre. For table standards, see the coin specification table.

The obverse side of all coins shows the coin's value in kanji characters as well as the country name (through 1945, Dai Nippon (大日本; "Great Japan"); after 1945, Nippon-koku (日本国; "State of Japan") (except for the 5-yen coin with the country name on the reverse). The reverse side of all coins shows the year of mintage, which is not shown in Gregorian calendar years, but instead in the regnal year of the reigning emperor, with the first year of an era called gannen (元年). Imperial portraits have never appeared on Japanese coins, as the image of the emperor remains sacred. The regnal year does not necessarily align with the calendar year. The first coins of the Reiwa era were minted in July 2019.

Examples

- Coins minted in 1900 bear the year 明治 (Meiji) 33, the 33rd year of Emperor Meiji's reign
- Coins minted in 1920 bear the year 大正 (Taishō) 9, the 9th year of Emperor Taishō's reign
- Coins minted in 1980 bear the year 昭和 (Shōwa) 55, the 55th year of Emperor Shōwa's reign
- Coins minted in 2000 bear the year 平成 (Heisei) 12, the 12th year of Emperor Akihito's reign
- Coins minted in 2020 bear the year 令和 (Reiwa) 2, the 2nd year of Emperor Naruhito's reign

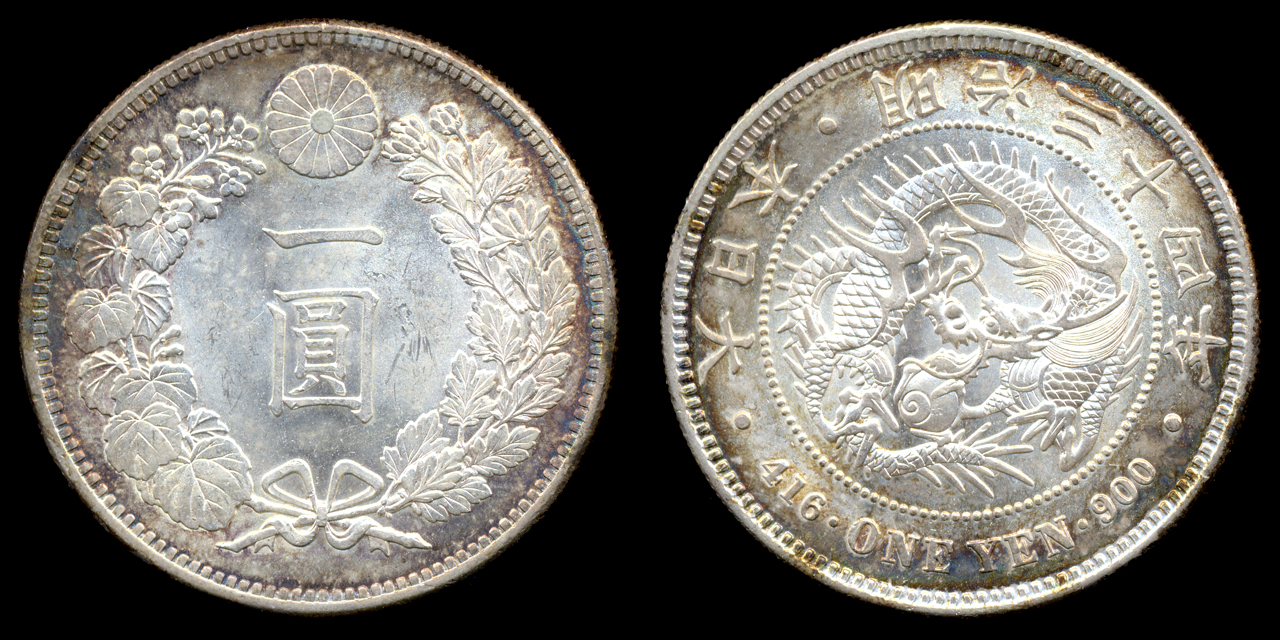
Early 1-yen coin from 1901 (Meiji year 34), 26.96 grams of 90% fine silver

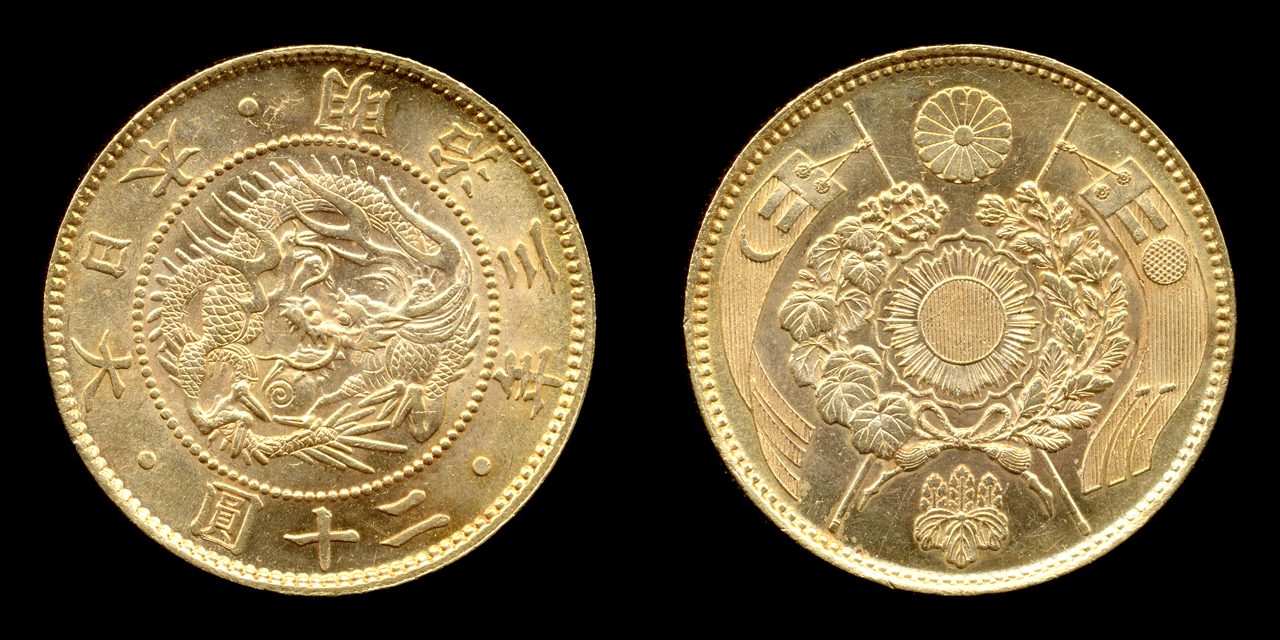
20 yen coin from 1870 (Meiji year 3)

In 1897, the silver 1 yen coin was demonetized and the sizes of the gold coins were reduced by 50%, with 5, 10 and 20 yen coins issued.

After the war, brass 50 sen, 1 and 5 yen were introduced between 1946 and 1948. The existing-type holed brass 5 yen was introduced in 1949, the bronze 10 yen in 1951, and the aluminum 1 yen in 1955.

In 1955 the first unholed, nickel 50 yen was introduced. In 1957, silver 100 yen pieces were introduced, followed by the holed 50 yen coin in 1959. These were replaced in 1967 by the existing cupro-nickel 100 yen along with a smaller 50 yen.

In 1982, the first cupronickel 500 yen coin was introduced. Alongside the 5 Swiss franc coin, the 500 yen coin is one of the highest-valued coin to be used regularly in the world, with a value of US$3.19 as of January 2026. Because of its high face value, the 500 yen coin has been a favorite target for counterfeiters, resulting in the issuance in 2000 of the second nickel-brass 500 yen coin with added security features. Continued counterfeiting of the latter resulted in the issuance in 2021 of the third bi-metallic 500 yen coin with more improvements in security features.

Due to the great differences in style, size, weight and the pattern present on the edge of the coin they are easy for people with visual impairments to tell apart from one another.

	Unholed	Holed
Smooth edge	¥1 (light) ¥10 (medium)	¥5
Reeded edge	¥100 (medium) ¥500 (heavy)	¥50

Commemorative coins have been minted on various occasions in base metal, silver and gold. The first of these were silver ¥100 and ¥1,000 Summer Olympic coins issued for the 1964 games. The largest issuance by denomination and total face value were 10 million gold coins of ¥100,000 denomination for the 60th anniversary of reign of the Shōwa Emperor in 1986, totalling ¥1 trillion and utilizing 200,000 kg fine gold. ¥500 commemorative coins have been regularly issued since 1985. In 2008 commemorative ¥500 and ¥1,000 coins were issued featuring Japan's 47 prefectures. Even though all commemorative coins can be spent like ordinary (non-commemorative) coins, they do not normally circulate, and ¥100,000 coins are treated with caution due to the discovery of counterfeits.

The 1 yen coin is made out of 100% aluminum and can float on water if placed correctly.

=== Formerly circulated coinage ===
==== Sen ====
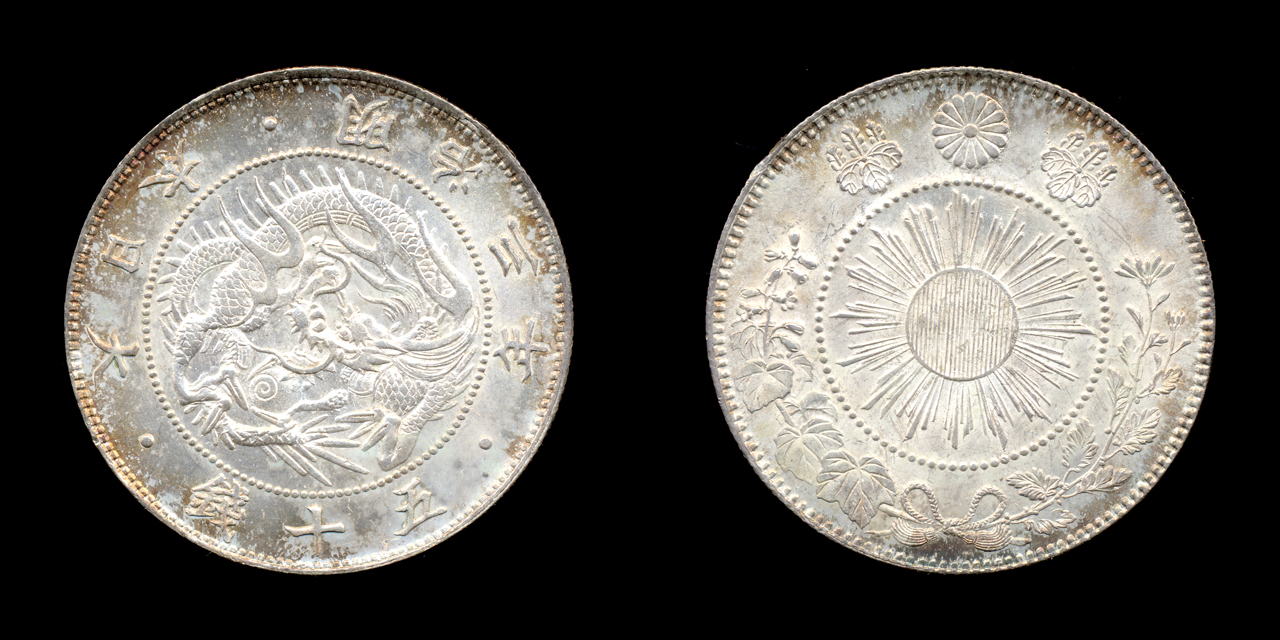
50 sen coin from 1870 (year 3 of Meiji)

Subsidiary coins of "sen" (one hundredth of a yen) were initially introduced in 1870 with a silver alloy in denominations of 5, 10, 20 and 50 sen. Copper sen coins in denominations of half, 1, and 2 came three years later, as Japan acquired the technology needed to mint them. The removal of silver from sen coinage began in 1889, when Cupronickel 5 sen coins were introduced. By 1920, this included cupro-nickel 10 sen and reduced-size silver 50 sen coins. Production of the latter ceased in 1938, after which a variety of base metals were used to produce 1, 5, and 10 sen coins during the Second World War. While clay 5 and 10 sen coins were produced in 1945, they were not issued for circulation. As with the Rin, coins in denominations of less than 1 yen became invalid at the end of 1953 and were demonetized due to inflation.

==== Rin ====
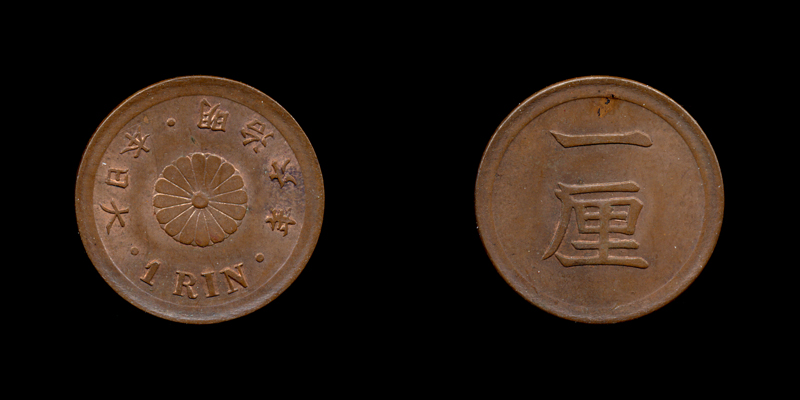
One rin coin from 1873 (year 6 of Meiji)

Bronze coins worth one-one thousandth of a yen called "rin" were first introduced in 1873. One rin coins were very small, measuring 15.75 mm in diameter and 0.3 mm in thickness, and co-circulated with mon coins of the old currency system. Their small size was eventually their undoing, and the rin was abandoned in 1884 due to unpopularity. (Note: With a diameter of 15.75 mm and a thickness of 0.3 mm, a one-rin coin is smaller than a 1 euro cent coin (16.25 mm and 1.67 mm respectively).) Five rin coins worth one-two hundredth of a yen also used a bronze alloy. These were successor coins to the equally valued half sen coin which had been previously minted until 1888. The decision to bring back an equally valued coin was in response to rising inflation caused by World War I which led to an overall shortage of subsidiary coins. The mintage period for five rin coins was brief as they were discontinued after only four years of production due to their sharp decline in monetary value. The overall demand for subsidiary coinage ended as Japan slipped into a post-war recession. Coins worth 1 and 5 rin were eventually officially taken out of circulation at the end of 1953 and demonetized.

== Banknotes ==
Value	Image		Dimensions	Main Color	Description		Date of issue	Issue suspended
Value	Obverse	Reverse	Dimensions	Main Color	Obverse	Reverse	Date of issue	Issue suspended
Series F
¥1000			150 × 76 mm	Blue	Kitasato Shibasaburō	The Great Wave off Kanagawa (from Thirty-six Views of Mount Fuji series by Hokusai)	3 July 2024	
¥5000			156 × 76 mm	Purple	Umeko Tsuda	Wisteria flowers	3 July 2024	
¥10,000			160 × 76 mm	Brown	Shibusawa Eiichi	Tokyo Station (Marunouchi side)	3 July 2024	
Series E
¥1000			150 × 76 mm	Blue	Hideyo Noguchi	Mount Fuji, Lake Motosu and cherry blossoms	1 November 2004	2026–2027 (expected)
¥5000			156 × 76 mm	Purple	Ichiyō Higuchi	Kakitsubata-zu (Painting of irises, a work by Ogata Kōrin)	1 November 2004	2026–2027 (expected)
¥10,000			160 × 76 mm	Brown	Fukuzawa Yukichi	Statue of hōō (phoenix) from Byōdō-in Temple	1 November 2004	2026–2027 (expected)
Series D
¥2000			154 × 76 mm	Green	Shureimon	The Tale of Genji and portrait of Murasaki Shikibu	19 July 2000	

The issuance of yen banknotes began in 1872, two years after the currency was introduced. Denominations have ranged from ¥1 to ¥10,000; since 1984, the lowest-valued banknote is the ¥1,000 note. Before and during World War II, various bodies issued banknotes in yen, such as the Ministry of Finance and the Imperial Japanese National Bank. The Allied forces also issued some notes shortly after the war. Since then, the Bank of Japan has been the exclusive note issuing authority. The bank has issued five series after World War II.

Japan is generally considered a cash-based society, with 38% of payments in Japan made by cash in 2014. Possible explanations are that cash payments protect one's privacy, merchants do not have to wait for payment, and it does not carry any negative connotation like credit.

At present, portraits of people from the Meiji period and later are printed on Japanese banknotes. The reason for this is that from the viewpoint of preventing forgery, it is desirable to use a precise photograph as an original rather than a painting for a portrait.

Series E banknotes were introduced in 2004 in ¥1000, ¥5000, and ¥10,000 denominations.

Series F banknotes were introduced on 3 July 2024. They were announced on 9 April 2019 by Finance Minister Tarō Asō. The ¥1000 note features Kitasato Shibasaburō and The Great Wave off Kanagawa, the ¥5000 note features Tsuda Umeko and Wisteria flowers, and the ¥10,000 note features Shibusawa Eiichi and Tokyo Station. The Ministry decided to not redesign the ¥2000 note due to low circulation. The EURion constellation pattern is present in the Series D, E and F banknotes.

== Determinants of value ==
Beginning in December 1931, Japan gradually shifted from the gold standard system to the managed currency system.

The relative value of the yen is determined in foreign exchange markets by the economic forces of supply and demand. The supply of the yen in the market is governed by the desire of yen holders to exchange their yen for other currencies to purchase goods, services, or assets. The demand for the yen is governed by the desire of foreigners to buy goods and services in Japan and by their interest in investing in Japan (buying yen-denominated real and financial assets).

Since the 1990s, the Bank of Japan, the country's central bank, has kept interest rates low to spur economic growth. Short-term lending rates have responded to this monetary relaxation and fell from 3.7% to 1.3% between 1993 and 2008. Low interest rates and low inflation, combined with a ready liquidity, prompted investors to borrow yen in Japan and invest it in other countries (such as the US) with significantly higher bank rates, a practice known as the carry trade. This has helped to keep the exchange rate of the yen low compared to other currencies, particularly the USD.

Most traded currencies by value Currency distribution of global foreign exchange market turnover
Currency	ISO 4217 code	Proportion of daily volume		Change (2022–2025)
Currency	ISO 4217 code	April 2022	April 2025	Change (2022–2025)
United States dollar	USD	88.4%	89.2%	▲0.8pp
Euro	EUR	30.6%	28.9%	▼1.7pp
Japanese yen	JPY	16.7%	16.8%	▲0.1pp
Pound sterling	GBP	12.9%	10.2%	▼2.7pp
Renminbi	CNY	7.0%	8.5%	▲1.5pp
Swiss franc	CHF	5.2%	6.4%	▲1.2pp
Australian dollar	AUD	6.4%	6.1%	▼0.3pp
Canadian dollar	CAD	6.2%	5.8%	▼0.4pp
Hong Kong dollar	HKD	2.6%	3.8%	▲1.2pp
Singapore dollar	SGD	2.4%	2.4%	Steady
Indian rupee	INR	1.6%	1.9%	▲0.3pp
South Korean won	KRW	1.8%	1.8%	Steady
Swedish krona	SEK	2.2%	1.6%	▼0.6pp
Mexican peso	MXN	1.5%	1.6%	▲0.1pp
New Zealand dollar	NZD	1.7%	1.5%	▼0.2pp
Norwegian krone	NOK	1.7%	1.3%	▼0.4pp
New Taiwan dollar	TWD	1.1%	1.2%	▲0.1pp
Brazilian real	BRL	0.9%	0.9%	Steady
South African rand	ZAR	1.0%	0.8%	▼0.2pp
Polish złoty	PLN	0.7%	0.8%	▲0.1pp
Danish krone	DKK	0.7%	0.7%	Steady
Indonesian rupiah	IDR	0.4%	0.7%	▲0.3pp
Turkish lira	TRY	0.4%	0.5%	▲0.1pp
Thai baht	THB	0.4%	0.5%	▲0.1pp
Israeli new shekel	ILS	0.4%	0.4%	Steady
Hungarian forint	HUF	0.3%	0.4%	▲0.1pp
Czech koruna	CZK	0.4%	0.4%	Steady
Chilean peso	CLP	0.3%	0.3%	Steady
Philippine peso	PHP	0.2%	0.2%	Steady
Colombian peso	COP	0.2%	0.2%	Steady
Malaysian ringgit	MYR	0.2%	0.2%	Steady
UAE dirham	AED	0.4%	0.1%	▼0.3pp
Saudi riyal	SAR	0.2%	0.1%	▼0.1pp
Romanian leu	RON	0.1%	0.1%	Steady
Peruvian sol	PEN	0.1%	0.1%	Steady
Other currencies		2.6%	3.4%	▲0.8pp
Total (Note: The total sum is 200% because each currency trade is counted twice: once for the currency being bought and once for the currency being sold. The percentages above represent the proportion of all trades involving a given currency, regardless of which side of the transaction it is on.)		200.0%	200.0%	

== International reserve currency ==
The special drawing rights (SDR) valuation is an IMF basket of the world's major reserve currencies, including the Japanese yen. Its share of 8.33% as of 2016 has declined from 18% as of 2000.

The percental composition of currencies of official foreign exchange reserves from 1995 to 2025.

== Historical exchange rate ==
Before the war commenced, the yen traded on an average of 3.6 yen to the USD. After the war the yen went as low as ¥600/US$ in 1947, as a result of currency overprinting in order to fund the war, and afterwards to fund the reconstruction.

When MacArthur and the US forces entered Japan in 1945, they decreed an official conversion rate of ¥15/US$. Within 1945–1946: the rate tanked to ¥50/US$ because of the ongoing inflation. During the first half of 1946, the rate fluctuated to ¥66/US$, and eventually plummeting to ¥600/US$ by 1947 because of the failure of the economic remedies. Eventually, the peg was officially moved to ¥270/US$ in 1948 before being adjusted again from 1949 to 1971 to ¥360/US$.

Beginning in 2022, the yen/USD rate has become increasingly weaker with each passing month. By July 2024, the price fell to upper ¥161/US$, marking the lowest exchange rate for the yen in 37.5 years on a nominal effective exchange rate and the lowest real effective exchange rate since the start of statistics by the Bank of Japan in 1970. One of the main reasons behind this fall was the US moving towards higher interest rates, while Japan remained "ultra-low". Other factors include the strength of the US economy and its labor market, while Japan continues to lag behind its peers to bring its economy back to its pre-pandemic size. Japan's trade balance staying in the red is also likely feeding into the weaker yen. Interviewed by The Asahi Shimbun in September 2022, Izuru Kato, chief economist at Totan Research, expressed concern about the sharp fall in its value since 2022. and Moneypost reported that the exchange rate instability had made it impossible to exchange the currency for Japanese yen at some exchange offices. With the rate returning to ¥150 in November 2023, concern deepened as Nikkei sources expected the yen to depreciate further in the future. The Economist (London) expressed concern over the performance of the Bank of Japan, suggested that a systemic risk is posed to the world financial system. Other reports of a weakening of the Japanese yen include the Noto Peninsula earthquake in January 2024, where previous earthquakes had seen a temporary appreciation of the yen against the USD, but this earthquake reversed the trend and weakened the yen against the USD. Goldman Sachs expects the Japanese yen to remain very weak in the coming months.

=== Average spot rates v USD ===
The table below shows the monthly average of the U.S. dollar–yen spot rate (JPY per USD) at 17:00 JST:

Year	Month											
Year	Jan	Feb	Mar	Apr	May	Jun	Jul	Aug	Sep	Oct	Nov	Dec
1949–1971	360											
1972	308											
1973	301.15	270.00	265.83	265.50	264.95	265.30	263.45	265.30	265.70	266.68	279.00	280.00
1974	299.00	287.60	276.00	279.75	281.90	284.10	297.80	302.70	298.50	299.85	300.10	300.95
1975	297.85	286.60	293.80	293.30	291.35	296.35	297.35	297.90	302.70	301.80	303.00	305.15
1976	303.70	302.25	299.70	299.40	299.95	297.40	293.40	288.76	287.30	293.70	296.45	293.00
1977	288.25	283.25	277.30	277.50	277.30	266.50	266.30	267.43	264.50	250.65	244.20	240.00
1978	241.74	238.83	223.40	223.90	223.15	204.50	190.80	190.00	189.15	176.05	197.80	195.10
1979	201.40	202.35	209.30	219.15	219.70	217.00	216.90	220.05	223.45	237.80	249.50	239.90
1980	237.73	244.07	248.61	251.45	228.06	218.11	220.91	224.34	214.95	209.21	212.99	209.79
1981	202.19	205.76	208.84	215.07	220.78	224.21	232.11	233.62	229.83	231.40	223.76	219.02
1982	224.55	235.25	240.64	244.90	236.97	251.11	255.10	258.67	262.74	271.33	265.02	242.49
1983	232.90	236.27	237.92	237.70	234.78	240.06	240.49	244.36	242.71	233.00	235.25	234.34
1984	233.95	233.67	225.52	224.95	230.67	233.29	242.72	242.24	245.19	246.89	243.29	247.96
1985	254.11	260.34	258.43	251.67	251.57	248.95	241.70	237.20	236.91	214.84	203.85	202.75
1986	200.05	184.62	178.83	175.56	166.89	167.82	158.65	154.11	154.78	156.04	162.72	162.13
1987	154.48	153.49	151.56	142.96	140.47	144.52	150.20	147.57	143.03	143.48	135.25	128.25
1988	127.44	129.26	127.23	124.88	124.74	127.20	133.10	133.63	134.45	128.85	123.16	123.63
1989	127.24	127.77	130.35	132.01	138.40	143.92	140.63	141.20	145.06	141.99	143.55	143.62
1990	145.09	145.54	153.19	158.50	153.52	153.78	149.23	147.46	138.96	129.73	129.01	133.72
1991	133.65	130.44	137.09	137.15	138.02	139.83	137.98	136.85	134.59	130.81	129.64	128.07
1992	125.05	127.53	132.75	133.59	130.55	126.90	125.66	126.34	122.72	121.14	123.84	123.98
1993	125.02	120.97	117.02	112.37	110.23	107.29	107.77	103.72	105.27	106.94	107.81	109.72
1994	111.49	106.14	105.12	103.48	104.00	102.69	98.54	99.86	98.79	98.40	98.00	100.17
1995	99.79	98.23	90.77	83.53	85.21	84.54	87.24	94.56	100.31	100.68	101.89	101.86
1996	105.81	105.70	105.85	107.40	106.49	108.82	109.25	107.84	109.76	112.30	112.27	113.74
1997	118.18	123.01	122.66	125.47	118.91	114.31	115.10	117.89	120.74	121.13	125.35	129.52
1998	129.45	125.85	128.83	131.81	135.08	140.35	140.66	144.76	134.50	121.33	120.61	117.40
1999	113.14	116.73	119.71	119.66	122.14	120.81	119.76	113.30	107.45	106.00	104.83	102.61
2000	105.21	109.34	106.62	105.35	108.13	106.13	107.90	108.02	106.75	108.34	108.87	112.21
2001	117.10	116.10	121.21	123.77	121.83	122.19	124.63	121.53	118.91	121.32	122.33	127.32
2002	132.66	133.53	131.15	131.01	126.39	123.44	118.08	119.03	120.49	123.88	121.54	122.17
2003	118.67	119.29	118.49	119.82	117.26	118.27	118.65	118.81	115.09	109.58	109.18	107.87
2004	106.39	106.54	108.57	107.31	112.27	109.45	109.34	110.41	110.05	108.90	104.86	103.82
2005	103.27	104.84	105.30	107.35	106.94	108.62	111.94	110.65	111.03	114.84	118.45	118.60
2006	115.33	117.81	117.31	117.13	111.53	114.57	115.59	115.86	117.02	118.59	117.33	117.26
2007	120.59	120.49	117.29	118.81	120.77	122.64	121.56	116.74	115.01	115.77	111.24	112.28
2008	107.60	107.18	100.83	102.41	104.11	106.86	106.76	109.24	106.71	100.20	96.89	91.21
2009	90.35	92.53	97.83	98.92	96.43	96.58	94.49	94.90	91.40	90.28	89.11	89.52
2010	91.26	90.28	90.56	93.43	91.79	90.89	87.67	85.44	84.31	81.80	82.43	83.38
2011	82.63	82.52	81.82	83.34	81.23	80.49	79.44	77.09	76.78	76.72	77.50	77.81
2012	76.94	78.47	82.37	81.42	79.70	79.27	78.96	78.68	78.17	78.97	80.92	83.60
2013	89.15	93.07	94.73	97.74	101.01	97.52	99.66	97.83	99.30	97.73	100.04	103.42
2014	103.94	102.02	102.30	102.54	101.78	102.05	101.73	102.95	107.16	108.03	116.24	119.29
2015	118.25	118.59	120.37	119.57	120.82	123.7	123.31	123.17	120.13	119.99	122.58	121.78
2016	118.18	115.01	113.05	109.72	109.24	105.44	103.97	101.28	101.99	103.81	108.33	116.01
2017	114.69	113.13	113.02	110.08	112.24	110.89	112.50	109.90	110.67	112.94	112.89	112.96
2018	110.74	107.90	106.01	107.49	109.74	110.02	111.41	111.06	111.91	112.81	113.36	112.38
2019	108.97	110.36	111.22	111.63	109.76	108.07	108.23	106.34	107.40	108.12	108.88	109.18
2020	109.38	109.96	107.67	107.83	107.23	107.64	106.76	106.00	105.61	105.21	104.30	103.75
2021	103.79	105.44	108.81	109.10	109.17	110.12	110.26	109.85	110.15	113.14	113.99	113.84
2022	114.84	115.24	118.67	126.31	128.82	134.10	136.39	135.28	143.09	147.16	142.17	134.85
2023	130.28	132.69	133.86	133.40	137.39	141.33	141.20	144.73	147.65	149.59	149.88	144.09
2024	146.59	149.41	149.70	153.57	156.21	157.90	157.86	146.29	143.31	149.60	153.82	153.72
2025	156.42	152.03	149.14	144.27	144.77	144.47	146.85	147.64	147.93	151.32	155.08	155.85
2026	156.79	155.23	158.64	159.38								
Year	Jan	Feb	Mar	Apr	May	Jun	Jul	Aug	Sep	Oct	Nov	Dec
Year	Month											

=== Average monthly real effective exchange rate ===
The table below shows monthly averages of real effective exchange rates. A higher figure indicates a stronger yen, while a lower figure indicates a weaker yen with the value of 100 being the 2020 average. Data from 1970 onwards are presented in the Broad range, while data from 1969 and earlier are presented in the Narrow range.

Year	Month											
Year	Jan	Feb	Mar	Apr	May	Jun	Jul	Aug	Sep	Oct	Nov	Dec
1964	56.84	56.41	56.40	56.94	60.09	59.97	59.93	60.40	60.92	61.63	61.27	61.52
1965	62.61	62.12	62.28	63.00	62.54	62.28	61.91	62.02	62.89	63.51	63.10	63.18
1966	63.69	63.76	63.49	64.06	63.35	63.05	63.11	62.41	63.16	63.30	62.62	63.26
1967	63.71	63.74	63.88	63.89	62.98	62.56	62.36	62.51	63.41	64.36	64.17	65.34
1968	65.59	65.66	65.49	65.35	65.24	64.61	64.60	64.92	66.52	66.30	66.44	66.00
1969	66.01	65.74	66.05	66.16	66.24	65.95	66.34	66.85	67.54	66.65	66.60	66.80
1970	75.02	74.58	74.86	74.93	74.41	74.28	73.79	73.45	74.15	75.03	74.89	74.97
1971	74.89	74.71	74.65	75.43	75.29	75.25	75.52	75.14	80.37	81.83	81.50	82.60
1972	83.65	85.23	86.25	86.88	86.52	86.83	87.18	87.21	87.44	88.13	87.95	88.22
1973	88.43	93.68	99.43	99.33	99.69	97.63	96.06	96.44	98.40	96.87	94.10	96.67
1974	94.83	96.83	98.09	100.51	98.97	98.17	96.24	93.02	94.59	95.45	94.32	94.31
1975	94.07	95.36	96.45	96.57	96.16	94.88	95.39	95.41	96.77	96.54	95.61	94.70
1976	96.02	97.17	98.03	100.70	100.62	100.61	102.21	102.09	105.77	104.53	102.72	103.28
1977	104.31	106.33	107.79	110.47	109.90	110.34	112.03	110.70	112.16	117.24	119.79	119.61
1978	117.86	117.68	121.74	128.01	126.35	130.89	138.18	144.39	143.49	145.01	138.74	134.75
1979	132.12	128.56	124.63	119.48	118.54	116.75	116.01	113.13	110.68	107.59	100.07	100.74
1980	101.44	98.70	98.22	98.82	106.14	109.72	107.31	105.42	110.53	113.48	112.34	113.93
1981	118.07	117.44	115.05	112.89	112.33	111.26	107.35	106.89	107.79	105.70	108.10	110.60
1982	107.74	103.82	102.40	102.07	103.56	98.88	97.17	96.67	96.62	94.31	96.37	103.85
1983	107.56	105.95	106.12	106.47	108.31	106.33	105.83	104.67	106.28	110.38	109.37	110.31
1984	111.25	110.07	112.50	113.19	112.37	110.11	107.66	106.84	108.62	109.03	109.05	108.73
1985	107.09	105.28	106.41	106.88	106.86	107.15	108.57	109.10	109.93	119.08	123.62	123.33
1986	123.96	132.45	135.48	138.53	144.34	143.03	149.58	151.97	150.87	149.01	142.55	141.60
1987	143.91	143.51	144.86	152.72	153.64	149.13	142.96	144.92	148.60	147.75	152.16	157.69
1988	157.86	156.01	157.01	158.89	159.12	156.73	151.78	151.83	151.42	156.40	159.58	157.76
1989	154.20	152.76	150.37	149.97	145.10	140.27	140.84	140.20	137.70	139.34	135.86	133.87
1990	130.73	129.33	123.74	119.75	122.90	122.12	123.67	122.54	130.03	138.48	138.24	133.76
1991	133.87	135.15	132.79	135.39	135.04	134.32	135.67	135.35	136.21	141.27	140.12	139.57
1992	142.41	140.21	136.24	136.13	137.56	139.94	137.51	136.29	141.26	145.52	146.06	146.09
1993	145.07	151.19	155.81	160.89	163.44	169.43	171.59	178.56	173.69	170.94	169.99	166.32
1994	164.09	170.65	172.27	174.85	172.72	172.35	176.40	173.22	173.68	173.81	173.97	170.57
1995	169.61	170.38	182.00	193.97	191.35	191.26	184.04	170.97	161.88	159.48	157.46	158.02
1996	151.68	150.54	150.03	148.45	150.17	146.29	145.44	146.15	143.81	141.04	139.92	138.72
1997	134.34	129.37	130.53	129.86	137.50	142.70	143.14	141.96	139.71	140.99	136.38	137.71
1998	142.75	143.57	138.72	134.02	132.12	128.71	127.33	123.75	132.15	145.16	145.03	147.76
1999	152.38	148.27	146.33	146.37	143.32	144.92	145.88	153.60	163.05	163.66	165.44	168.50
2000	162.97	156.40	161.77	164.01	162.57	163.77	161.06	162.07	164.68	163.58	162.86	157.10
2001	149.26	149.77	144.39	142.62	145.00	145.25	142.37	144.10	146.64	144.34	142.90	137.43
2002	131.53	129.68	132.08	131.66	134.85	136.45	140.47	140.64	138.40	134.89	136.24	134.86
2003	135.69	133.74	134.92	133.37	134.10	132.29	132.45	132.98	136.27	140.96	140.39	140.47
2004	140.04	139.10	137.38	138.32	133.74	136.69	135.74	134.57	134.77	135.60	138.13	136.97
2005	137.34	133.68	132.80	130.79	132.12	130.72	127.03	126.91	126.30	122.57	119.18	118.46
2006	119.50	116.36	117.04	115.83	119.90	117.88	116.12	115.99	114.83	113.28	112.68	111.18
2007	108.22	106.54	109.24	106.57	104.47	102.38	101.65	106.90	107.27	104.61	107.50	106.21
2008	109.12	107.79	113.15	109.93	109.18	106.31	105.42	105.52	110.51	122.97	129.91	137.00
2009	137.51	136.05	128.82	125.28	124.95	123.55	125.77	124.36	127.70	127.10	127.82	126.84
2010	124.50	126.81	125.81	121.10	125.49	128.28	130.53	132.58	132.64	133.64	131.82	130.63
2011	129.83	128.13	128.53	123.86	126.80	127.55	128.54	132.20	134.77	135.86	133.74	133.98
2012	134.95	130.59	124.53	126.39	130.18	131.89	131.84	131.32	130.30	128.09	124.56	119.56
2013	111.68	106.05	105.13	101.81	98.91	103.09	101.16	103.03	101.21	101.77	99.96	96.51
2014	96.11	97.68	97.53	99.23	100.09	99.82	99.99	99.17	95.94	95.80	89.64	88.47
2015	90.59	90.25	90.07	90.44	89.14	87.04	87.96	89.50	92.39	91.85	90.64	91.80
2016	95.47	97.04	97.57	99.57	101.09	104.48	106.10	108.28	107.59	106.96	104.06	97.80
2017	97.79	98.46	98.36	100.78	98.38	98.62	96.40	97.59	95.93	94.74	94.94	94.36
2018	94.12	95.30	97.00	95.54	95.37	95.93	96.18	97.85	96.78	96.78	96.62	97.10
2019	99.20	96.92	96.21	96.00	98.51	99.79	99.33	102.87	101.64	100.47	99.19	98.56
2020	97.49	97.35	101.60	102.99	103.42	100.94	100.76	100.24	99.75	99.35	98.68	97.44
2021	97.05	95.02	93.12	91.83	91.04	90.25	91.11	91.44	91.15	88.25	87.59	87.75
2022	86.66	85.89	83.97	79.30	79.44	75.97	75.70	77.01	74.55	73.71	75.20	77.67
2023	78.95	77.16	77.49	77.54	76.04	74.34	74.37	73.08	72.33	72.50	71.44	73.40
2024	72.58	70.72	70.81	69.87	68.90	68.37	68.27	72.87	73.49	71.23	71.11	71.84
2025	71.34	72.83	69.47	70.81	69.47	68.45	67.11	67.12	66.61			
Year	Jan	Feb	Mar	Apr	May	Jun	Jul	Aug	Sep	Oct	Nov	Dec
Year	Month											

JPY/USD exchange rate since 1950

JPY/USD exchange rate in the Heisei and Reiwa eras

JPY/CAD exchange rate

JPY/EUR exchange rate

JPY/GBP exchange rate

JPY/CHF exchange rate

JPY/AUD exchange rate

JPY/NZD exchange rate

JPY/ZAR exchange rate

JPY/CNY exchange rate

KRW/JPY exchange rate

JPY/INR exchange rate

Current JPY exchange rates
From Google Finance:	AUD CAD CHF CNY EUR GBP HKD USD KRW EUR USD
From Yahoo! Finance:	AUD CAD CHF CNY EUR GBP HKD USD KRW EUR USD
From XE.com:	AUD CAD CHF CNY EUR GBP HKD USD KRW EUR USD
From OANDA:	AUD CAD CHF CNY EUR GBP HKD USD KRW EUR USD

== See also ==
- Japan Mint
- Japanese military currency
- Economy of Japan
- Capital flows in Japan
- Monetary and fiscal policy of Japan
- Balance of payments accounts of Japan (1960–1990)
- List of countries by leading trade partners
- List of the largest trading partners of Japan
- Korean Empire won (1902–1910)

=== Older currency ===
- Japanese mon (currency)
- Koban (coin)
- Ryō
- Wadōkaichin

== Notes ==
Preceded by: Japanese mon	Currency of Japan; 1870 –	Succeeded by: Current
