= National Tax Agency =

Official tax collecting agency of Japan

- NTA
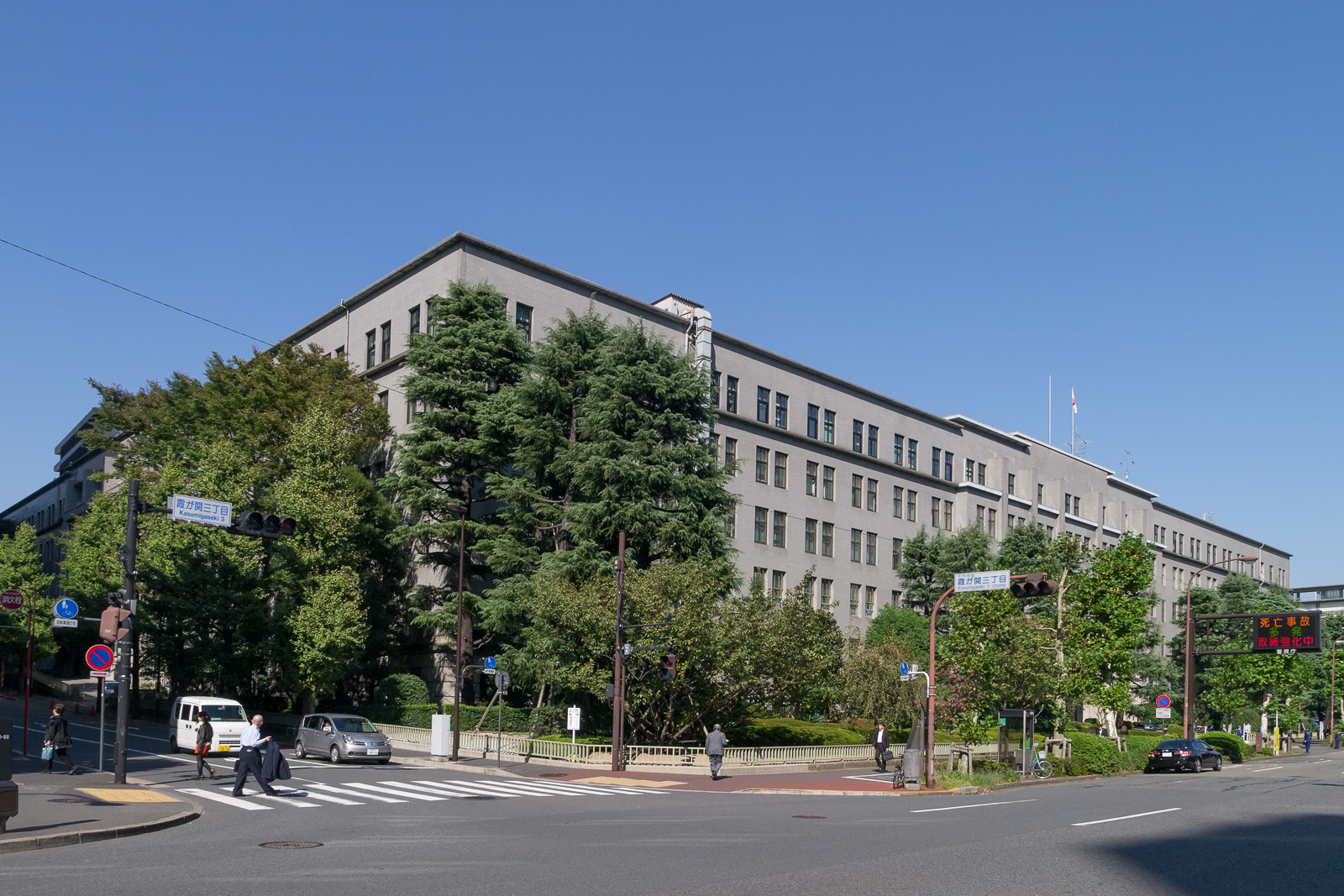

Agency overview
- Formed: June 1, 1949
- Jurisdiction: Government of Japan
- Headquarters: Tokyo, Japan
- Employees: 56,315 (FY 2003)
- Annual budget: 721.9 billion yen (FY 2003)
- Agency executive: Takanori Aoki, Commissioner
- Parent agency: Ministry of Finance
- Website: Official website

The National Tax Agency (国税庁, Kokuzei-chō; NTA) is the official tax collecting agency of Japan. As of August 2026, the NTA commissioner is Takanori Aoki.

== Mission ==
Mission: To enable taxpayers to properly and smoothly fulfill their tax responsibility.

To achieve the mission stated above, National Tax Agency is responsible for fulfilling the responsibilities stipulated in Article 19 of the Law to Establish the Ministry of Finance, while paying due consideration to transparency and efficiency.

=== Achieving proper and fair taxation and collection ===
To create a favorable environment for taxpayers:

NTA shall provide correct and easy-to-understand information on legal interpretation and administrative procedures for filing tax returns and paying taxes.
NTA shall quickly and accurately handle inquiries from taxpayers.
NTA shall endeavor to call on other ministries and citizens from all parts of society for their cooperation and participation in order to improve public understanding and support regarding the role of tax and tax administration.

==== Achieving proper and fair taxation ====
To achieve proper and fair taxation:

NTA shall ensure that laws and regulations are applied properly.
NTA shall endeavor to have taxpayers file accurate tax returns and shall correct mistakes in tax returns by conducting tax examinations of and providing guidance for those taxpayers whose returns are deemed to be inaccurate.
NTA shall endeavor to have taxpayers submit their tax payments by the deadline and shall surely collect the taxes of those who have not paid by the deadline by implementing delinquency procedures.

To protect the rights and interests of taxpayers:

NTA shall properly and promptly respond to requests for reinvestigation or requests for reconsideration.

==== Achieving sound development in the alcoholic beverage industry ====
NTA shall endeavor to promote the sound management of the alcoholic beverage industry, promote research and development on brewing technologies, and maintain the quality and safety of alcoholic beverages.
NTA shall endeavor to ensure effective use of resources for alcoholic beverages.

to ensure the proper activity of certified public tax accountants:

NTA shall endeavor to ensure that certified public tax accountants properly engage in their duties and play their vital role in implementing the self-assessment system properly and smoothly in accordance with their responsibilities.

== Creation ==
On June 1, 1949, NTA was established as an affiliated agency of the Ministry of Finance, responsible for assessing and collecting national taxes. Until then, this role was performed by Tax Bureau of Ministry of Finance. Immediately after the Second World War, tax administration did not function properly as the Tax Bureau had undertaken out-of-scope operations. This organizational reform established NTA's current three-tiered organizational structure consisting of the head office, regional taxation bureaus and tax offices. NTA consists of the headquarters office, 11 regional taxation bureaus (Sapporo, Sendai, Kanto-Shin-Etsu, Tokyo, Kanazawa, Nagoya, Osaka, Hiroshima, Takamatsu, Fukuoka and Kumamoto), Okinawa Regional Taxation Office and 524 tax offices throughout the country.

NTA's headquarters office has four departments: Commissioner's Secretariat; Taxation Department; Revenue Management and Collection Department; and Examination and Criminal Investigation Department.

Examination and Criminal Investigation Department at regional taxation bureau level examines large-scale corporation's corporate and consumption taxes and investigates tax evasion cases.

The local tax office is a front-line administrative body in charge of assessing and collecting domestic taxes and has the closest contacts with taxpayers. Tax office is authorized to assess and collect domestic taxes within its responsible area. Its organization structure varies, depending on tax office's scale. Generally, a tax office has 1 division and 4 groups: co-ordination division, revenue management and collection group, examination group (individual), examination group (property tax), and examination group (corporation).

=== Budget and personnel ===
As of the end of FY2003, the number of employees stands at 56,315.

As of FY2003, the total budget for tax collection operating costs stands at 721.9 billion yen.

The cost to collect 100 yen of tax and stamp duty revenues (return on collection) is 1.78 yen as of FY2003, while it was 2.79 yen in FY1950.

== Voluntary reporting system ==
Japan relies on the self-assessment along with withholding tax system with respect to specific income and blue return systems. The due date for payment of 2011 income tax is Thursday, March 15, 2012.

=== Self-assessment ===
In the self-assessment taxation approach, taxpayers calculate their taxable income, file tax returns and pay their taxes due. This taxation system basically presupposes taxpayer's willingness to pay taxes, continue accurate bookkeeping behavior and calculate their taxable income based on objective data. This approach was adopted, in 1947, under the strong influence of the United States taxation system.

=== Blue return system ===
Proper operation of the self-assessment taxation system requires regular and accurate bookkeeping by taxpayers. To foster the practice of bookkeeping, the blue return system was introduced in 1950 as a part of comprehensive tax reform based on the recommendations of Dr. Carl Shoup.

Under the blue return system, an individual who operates a business or a corporation may obtain the district director's approval to file a tax return using a special form printed on blue paper. While these taxpayers are required to maintain books and keep continuous accounting records in accordance with prescribed standards, they are entitled by law to various income calculation benefits and preferential treatments.

Today, the blue return system is widely accepted. There are 4.95 million blue return personal taxpayers, and more than 2.6 million corporations are filing blue returns.

== Mutual agreement procedures ==
During the FY 2010, the NTA received 157 MAP cases, of which were on BAPA. The United States and Canada are treaty partners for MAP case purposes.

The Pacific Association of Tax Administrators (PATA) issued internal operational guidance in respect of mutual agreement procedures (MAP) and bilateral advance pricing arrangements (BAPA). PATA is composed of representatives from the tax administrations of Australia, Canada, Japan, and the United States.

== International coordination ==
On June 21, 2012, the Financial Services Agency (FSA), the Ministry of Finance (MOF) and the National Tax Agency (NTA) and the United States authority (the Treasury Department) have released a joint statement regarding a framework for intergovernmental cooperation to facilitate the implementation of FATCA and improve international tax compliance.
