= Japan External Trade Organization =

Administrative agency in Japan

Japan External Trade Organization (日本貿易振興機構, Nihon Bōeki Shinkōkikō; also ジェトロ; JETRO) is an Independent Administrative Institution established by Japan Export Trade Research Organization as a nonprofit corporation in Osaka in February 1952, reorganized under the Ministry of International Trade and Industry (MITI) in 1958 (later the Ministry of Economy, Trade and Industry or METI), and became an Independent Administrative Institution in 2003 to consolidate Japan's efforts in export promotion. The government has provided more than half of JETRO's annual operating budget. As of January 2020, JETRO maintained seventy-four offices in fifty-four countries, as well as forty-eight regional offices in Japan, with a total staff of 1,730 (998 domestic, 732 overseas). Its main office is located in the Ark Mori Building in Akasaka, Tokyo. Initially, JETRO's activities focused mainly on promoting exports to other countries. As exporters established themselves in world markets and the balance of trade turned from deficit to surplus, however, JETRO's role shifted to encompass more varied activities. These have included the furtherance of mutual understanding with trading partners, strategic investment attraction, import promotion, liaison between small businesses in Japan and their overseas counterparts, and data dissemination. Import promotion services have included publications, promotion of trade fairs, seminars, and trade missions.

JETRO also provides information and support to foreign companies looking for successful entry and expansion in the Japanese market. JETRO provides a wide range of services, such as timely market intelligence, extensive business development support, and relevant business events, designed to encourage new business between foreign companies and Japan. JETRO also provides current information on the laws and regulations surrounding new business operation in Japan to assist companies in expanding their business to Japan.

== Organization ==
Name: Japan External Trade Organization (JETRO)

Authorizing law: Japan External Trade Organization Incorporated Administrative Agency Act (December 13, 2002, Law No. 172)

Established: October 1, 2003

Representative: Nobuhiko Sasaki, Chairman & CEO

Address: Ark Mori Building, 6F 12–32, Akasaka 1-chome, Minato-ku, Tokyo 107–6006 Japan

Domestic Offices: JETRO Headquarters Tokyo, JETRO Osaka, Institute of Developing Economies, JFOODO and 48 regional offices

Overseas Offices: 74 offices (54 countries) (as of January 2020)

Employees: 1,730 people (998 domestic & 732 overseas) (as of April 2019)

== See also ==
- Japan Bank for International Cooperation
- Economic relations of Japan
- List of countries by leading trade partners
- List of the largest trading partners of Japan
