= Balance of payments accounts of Japan (1960–1990) =

In its balance of payments accounts, Japan has traditionally run a deficit in services. Trade in services includes transportation (freight and passenger fares), insurance, travel expenditures, royalties, licensing fees, and income from investments. The deficit in services rose steadily from US$99 million in 1960, to nearly US$1.8 billion in 1970 and to more than US$11.3 billion in 1980 which can be attributed to rising royalty and licensing payments for Japan's acquisition of technology from other industrial countries and to rising deficits in the trade-related services of transportation and insurance. The transportation deficit rose after the 1960s, as rapidly climbing labor costs made Japanese-flag vessels less competitive, leading to greater use of foreign-flag carriers (including many flag of convenience vessels actually owned by Japanese interests).

Beginning in the late 1970s, however, rapidly growing overseas investments began to increase the inflow of investment income. The investments themselves are part of capital flows in the balance of payments, but repatriation of earnings on those investments is part of the services account. From a small surplus of US$900 million in 1978, the balance on investment income (earnings from abroad minus the earnings of foreigners in Japan) grew to US$21 billion by 1988. The tremendous growth in Japanese investments abroad had not been matched by any such growth of foreign investment in Japan.

Despite the rapid growth in Japan's investment income surplus, the country's total services account remained in deficit in the 1980s. Offsetting the rising surpluses in investment income were an enormous jump in the deficit on overseas travel and purchases by Japanese citizens while abroad. The net balance on passenger transportation deteriorated from a net deficit of US$1.3 billion in 1985 to a net deficit of US$3.7 billion by 1988, and travel (purchases of goods and services by individuals while abroad) increased from US$3.7 billion to US$15.8 billion over the same short time. This burst of overseas travel and spending came as the movement in the exchange rate made foreign travel more attractive to the Japanese. It also reflected the rising perception among Japanese consumers that prices for a wide range of manufactured items were substantially lower abroad than at home, giving them an incentive to purchase these items while out of their country. By the end of the decade, the number of Japanese taking overseas trips approached 10 million annually.

One other nonmerchandise transaction is included in the current account balance—net transfers. These represent the flow of foreign aid from Japan. As the country supplied more foreign aid, the deficit in this account rose from US$1.5 billion in 1980 to US$5.4 billion in 1990 and more than doubled to US$17.6 billion in 1991.

Adding net exports of services and net transfers to the merchandise trade balance, with imports measured free on board (f.o.b.), rather than as customs, insurance, and freight (c.i.f.), gives the balance on current account. Movements in Japan's current account balance have generally mirrored those of the merchandise trade balance considered earlier, although deficits in services and net transfers have offset the surpluses somewhat. Japan began to register surpluses in the current account in 1965, which later continued to rise, although they were punctuated by short-term deficits following the two oil price hikes in 1973 and 1979 (cf. 1973 oil crisis and 1979 energy crisis).

During the 1980s, Japan's current account balance shot from a record deficit of US$10.7 billion in 1980 to a record surplus of US$87 billion in 1987 before declining to US$57.1 billion in 1989. As a share of GNP, this surplus reached a peak of 4.4 percent in 1985, a large value for a current account surplus. The appreciation of the yen against the United States dollar and other currencies, beginning in 1985, was slow to have any impact on the dollar value of the current account surplus, although it did decline by US$8 billion in 1988.
