= Monetary and fiscal policy of Japan =

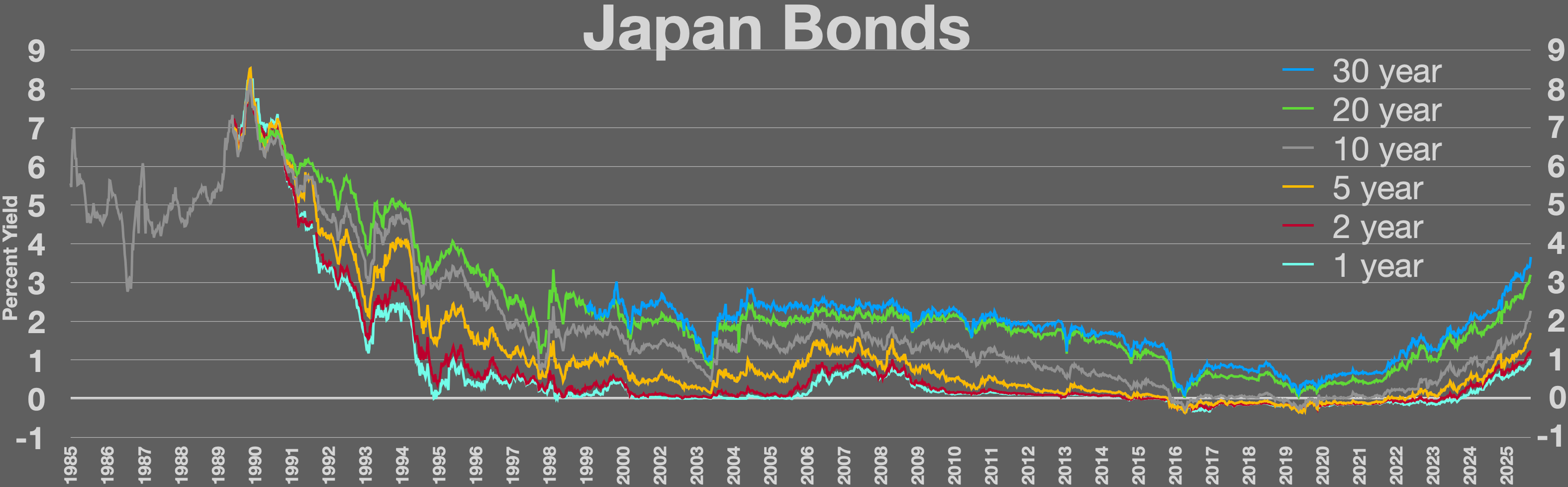
Japan bonds Inverted yield curve in 1990 Zero interest-rate policy started in 1999 Negative interest policy started in 2016 30 year 20 year 10 year 5 year 2 year 1 year

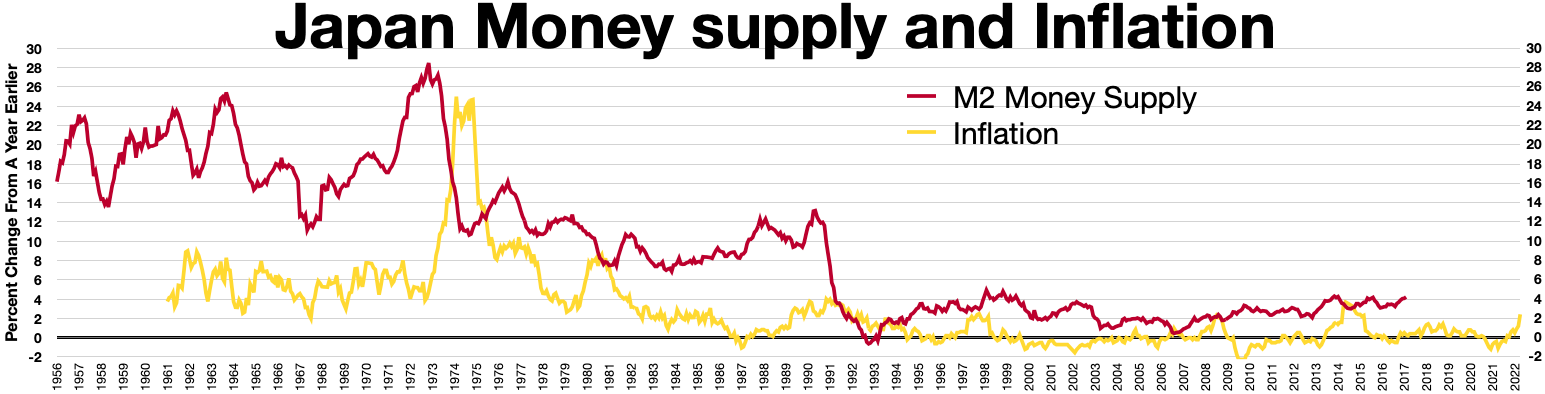
Japan money supply and inflation (year over year) M2 money supply Inflation

Monetary policy pertains to the regulation, availability, and cost of credit, while Fiscal policy deals with government expenditures, taxes, and debt. Through management of these areas, the Ministry of Finance regulated the allocation of resources in the economy, affected the distribution of income and wealth among the citizenry, stabilized the level of economic activities, and promoted economic growth and welfare.

The Ministry of Finance played an important role in Japan's postwar economic growth. It advocated a "growth first" approach, with a high proportion of government spending going to capital accumulation, and minimum government spending overall, which kept both taxes and deficit spending down, making more money available for private investment. Most Japanese put money into savings accounts, mostly postal savings.

== Budget process ==
The Budget Bureau of the Ministry of Finance is at the heart of the political process because it draws up the national budget each year. This responsibility makes it the ultimate focus of interest groups and of other ministries that compete for limited funds. The budgetary process generally begins soon after the start of a new fiscal year on April 1. Ministries and government agencies prepare budget requests in consultation with the Policy Research Council.

In the fall of each year, Budget Bureau examiners reviews these requests in great detail, while top Ministry of Finance officials work out the general contours of the new budget and the distribution of tax revenues. During the winter, after the release of the ministry's draft budget, campaigning by individual Diet members for their constituents and different ministries for revisions and supplementary allocations becomes intense. The coalition leaders and Ministry of Finance officials consult on a final draft budget, which is generally passed by the Diet in late winter.

== National debt ==
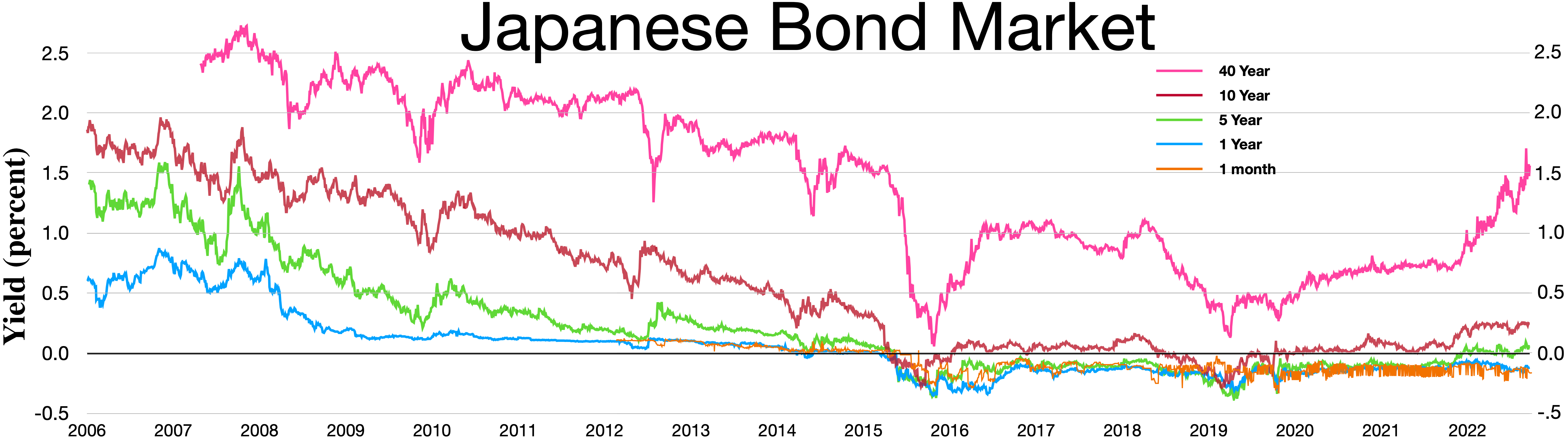
Japanese Bond Market Negative interest rates started in 2014 40 year bond 10 year bond 5 year bond 1 year bond 1 month bond

In 2011 Japan's public debt was about 230 percent of its annual gross domestic product, the largest percentage of any nation in the world.

In order to address the Japanese budget gap and growing national debt, in June 2012 the Japanese Diet passed a bill to double the national consumption tax to 10%. The new bill increases the tax to 8% by April 2014 and 10% by October 2015. However, it was delayed until at least October 2019.

== See also ==
- Defense budget of Japan
- Ministry of Finance (Japan)
- Bank of Japan
