= Portfolio investment =

Investments in the form of a group of assets

Net portfolio investment

Portfolio investments are investments in the form of a group (portfolio) of assets, including transactions in equity, securities, such as common stock, and debt securities, such as banknotes, bonds, and debentures.

Portfolio investment covers a range of securities, such as stocks and bonds, as well as other types of investment vehicles. A diversified portfolio helps spread risk, reducing the impact of underperformance by one or a few assets.

Unlike foreign direct investment (FDI), which implies a lasting interest and managerial control, portfolio investment is generally shorter-term, more liquid, and sensitive to fluctuations in global financial markets.

== See also ==
- Portfolio (finance)
