= Ministry of Finance (Japan) =

Government ministry of Japan

Coordinates: 35.673°N 139.749°E

- 財務省; Zaimushō
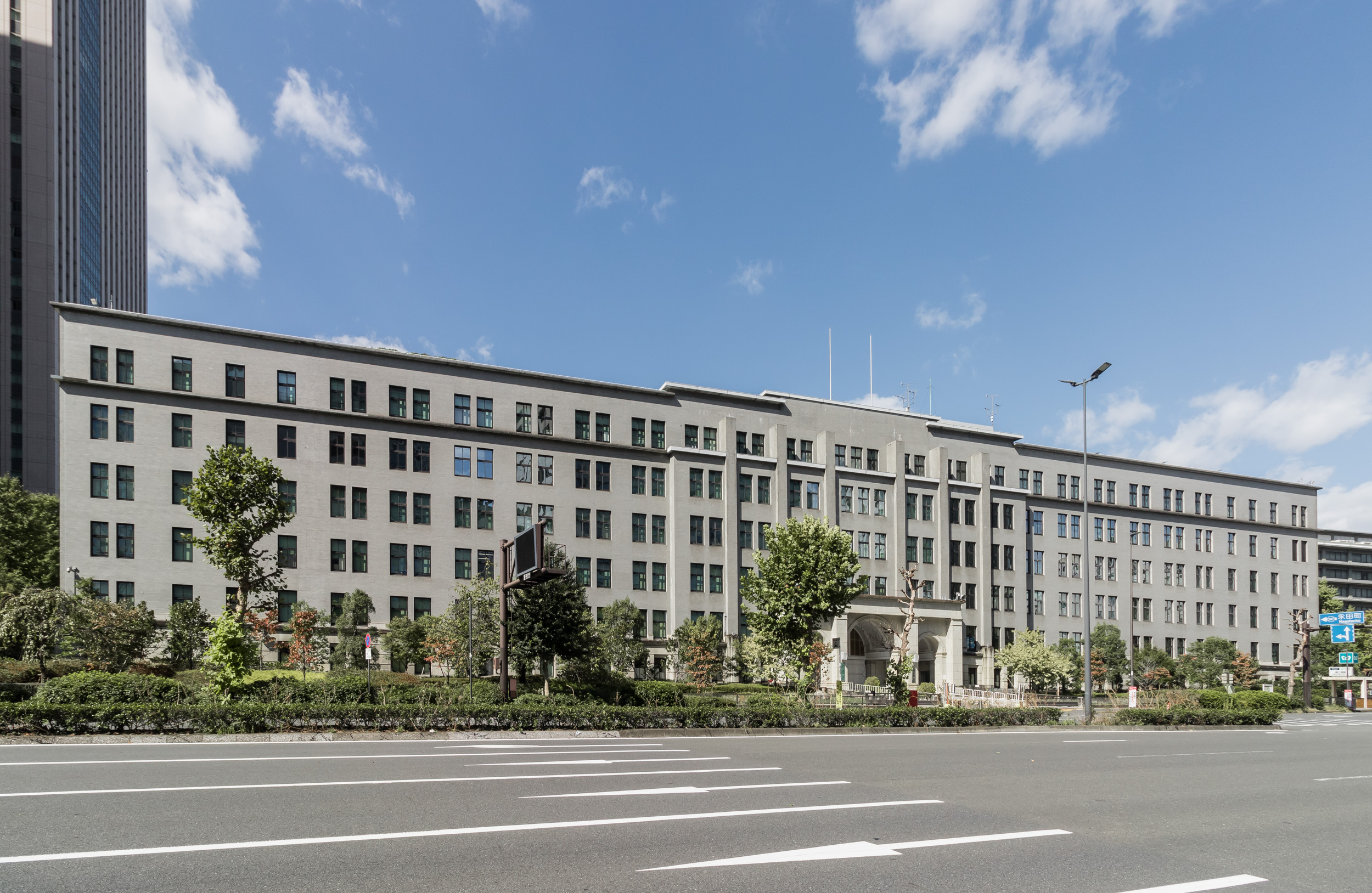
- Ministry of Finance building in Kasumigaseki

Agency overview
- Formed: June 1, 2001
- Preceding agency: Ministry of Finance (大蔵省, Ōkura-shō) (until 2001)
- Jurisdiction: Government of Japan
- Headquarters: 3-1-1 Kasumigaseki, Chiyoda-ku, Tokyo, Japan 〒100-8940
- Ministers responsible: Satsuki Katayama, Minister; Kenta Wakabayashi, State Minister; Kanehiko Shindo, State Minister
- Child agency: National Tax Agency
- Website: mof.go.jp

The Ministry of Finance (財務省, Zaimu-shō) is one of the cabinet-level ministries of the Japanese government. The ministry was named the Ōkura-shō (大蔵省) until 2001. The Ministry is headed by the Minister of Finance (財務大臣, Zaimu-daijin), who is a member of the Cabinet and is typically chosen from members of the Diet by the Prime Minister.

The ministry's history dates back to the 6th century in ancient Japan. After the Meiji Restoration, the Ministry of Finance was established. The ministry's power over banking supervision was split to the newly established Financial Services Agency in 1990s.

== Overview ==
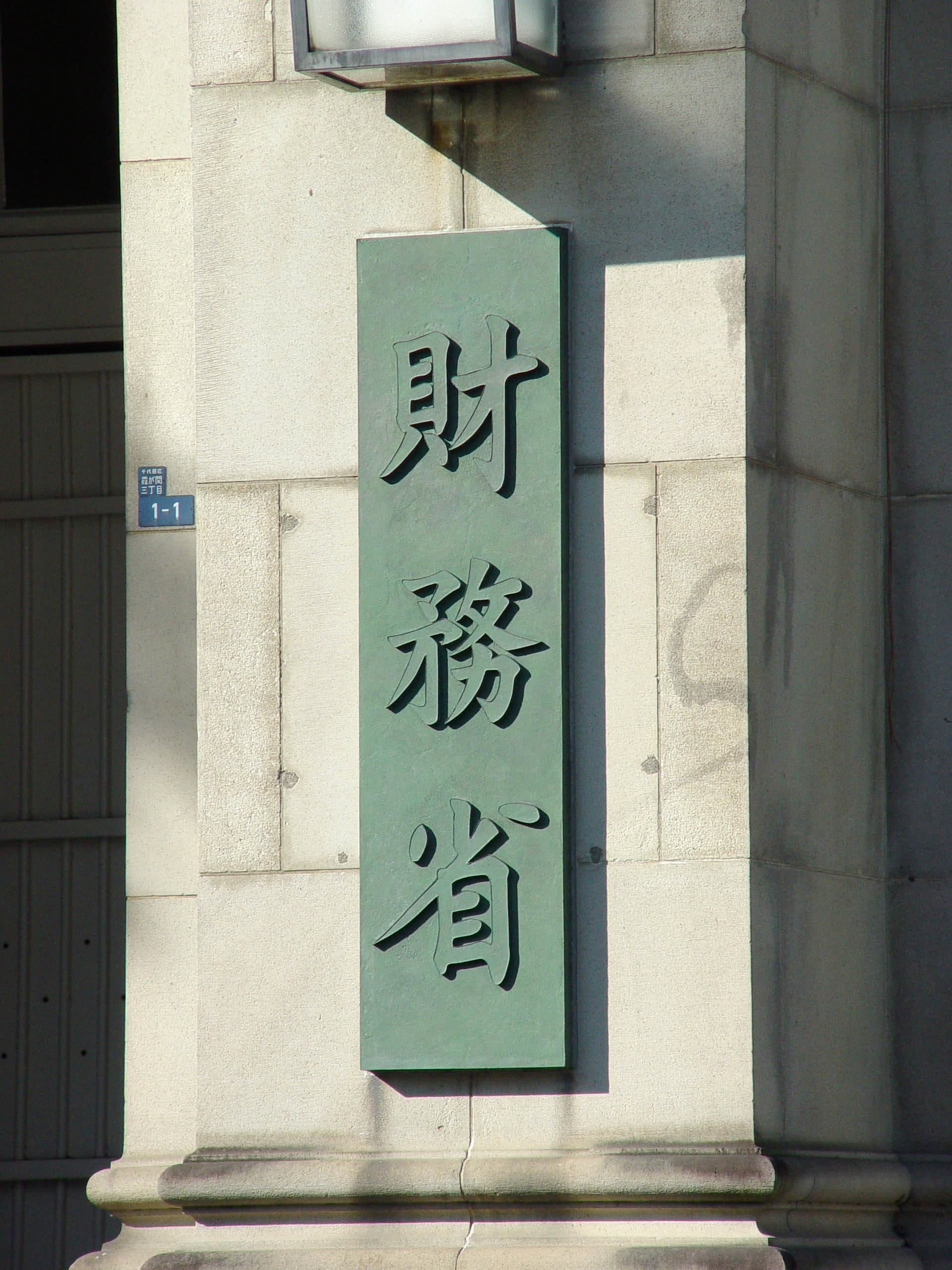
Ministry of Finance entrance

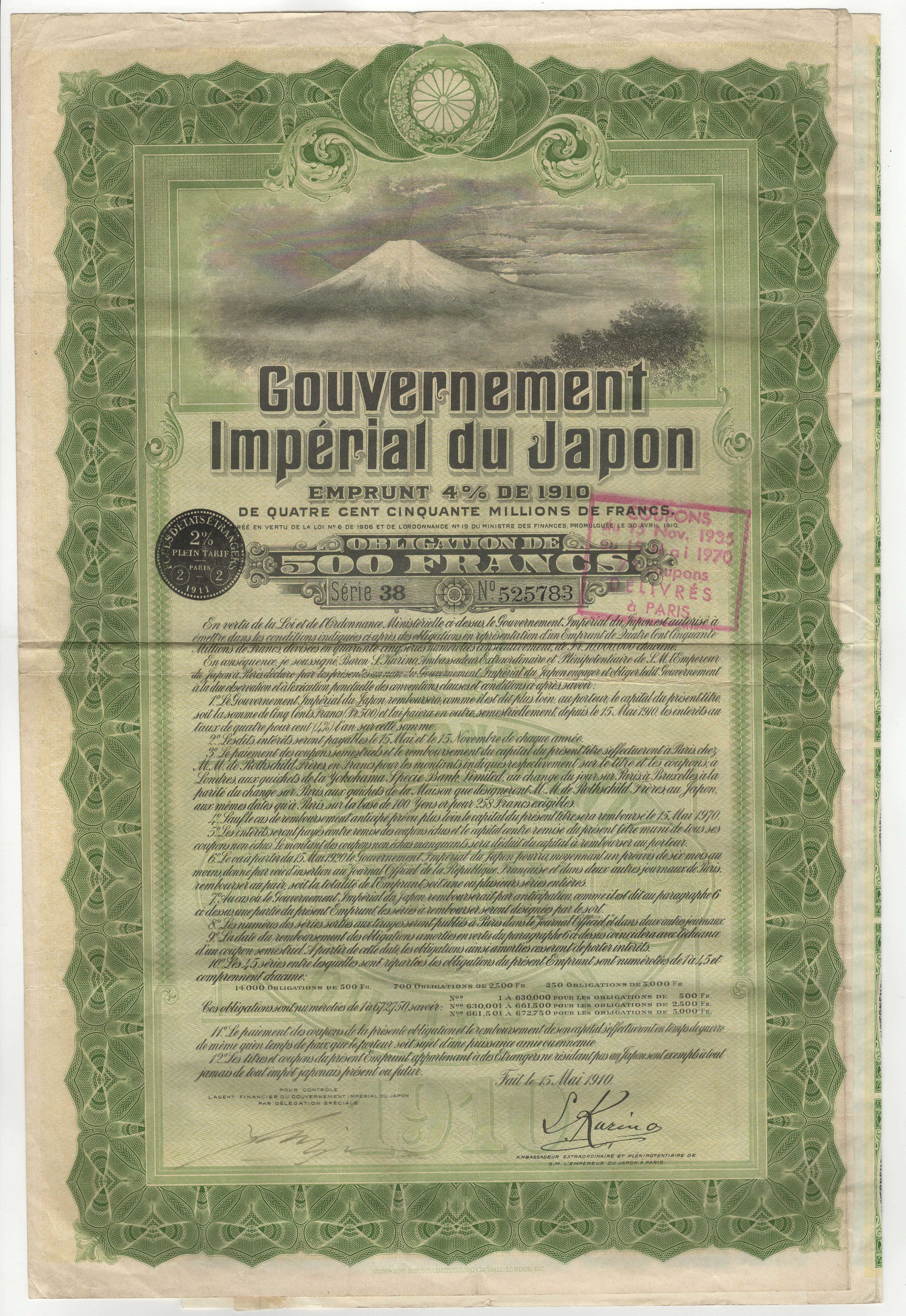
Bond of Japan issued 15 May 1910; vignette with Mount Fuji

The Ministry originated in the 6th century, when the Ōkura (大蔵) was established as a state treasury in ancient Japan. When a modern system of government was introduced after the Meiji Restoration, the Ministry of Finance (大蔵省, Ōkura-shō) was established as a government body in charge of public finance and monetary affairs. It is said that new ministry employees are subtly reminded that the Ōkura-shō predates by some 1269 years when the new Constitution was imposed on the nation by the U.S. occupation forces in 1947.

The Ministry has long been regarded as the most powerful ministry in the Japanese government. After various financial scandals revealed in the 1990s, however, the Ministry lost its power over banking supervision to a newly established Financial Services Agency. It also lost most of its control over monetary policy to the Bank of Japan when the Diet passed a new Bank of Japan Law in 1998. In addition, it lost its ancient Japanese name when it was renamed the Zaimu-shō (財務省) in January 2001, although its English name remained the same.

In financial markets, the Ministry is famous for its active foreign exchange policy. Its top civil servant on the international side, Vice Minister of Finance for International Affairs, is often quoted in the financial press. Former Vice Minister Eisuke Sakakibara was known as "Mr Yen", whereas his successors Haruhiko Kuroda and Zenbei Mizoguchi were often referred to as "Mr. Asian Currency" and "Mr. Dollar", respectively.

The ministry has been criticized for attempting to stop major media networks from broadcasting negative informations against the ministry, mainly by hounding newspapers and others until a mistake is found in the declaration of incomes, whether it is a minor one or not. Among the newspapers and other media networks affected by this action are Chunichi Shimbun, Sankei Shimbun, Kyodo News, and more. Following the 2024 Japanese general election, criticisms against the ministry skyrocketed, mainly due to the ministry hesitating to pass a proposal by the Democratic Party For the People to reduce the income taxes. The ministry was compared to the Aum Shinrikyo on the internet, with the ministry nicknamed "Zaimu Shinrikyō"(ザイム真理教) on social media platforms. Several protests calling for the dissolution of the ministry in front of the ministry were held from February 21, 2025. The protests, initially at the size of around a thousand spread across cities, with organizers holding protests in regional cities such as Fukuoka and Takamatsu. The lack of initial media attention towards this protest compared to others was criticized on the internet. The protests themselves received mixed reactions, with Hiroyuki Nishimura describing the protests as "a waste of time, money, and power", criticizing the protests' lack of force to cause any changes. Nishimura cited French protests in the interview, referring to how buildings were torched during protests. Shigeru Ishiba denied the accusation that the ministry held too much power over both deciding budgets and taxes, referring to how countries such as United States had similar systems. People who attend these demonstrations tend to be supporters of the Reiwa Shinsengumi and Sanseito, as well as those steeped in conspiracy theories.

== Organizational structure ==
The Customs and Tariff Bureau (Customs flag shown) is one of the divisions of the Ministry.

The Ministry is organized in six bureaus that provide the overall functions of the ministry:

- Minister's Secretariat
- Budget Bureau
- Tax Bureau
- Customs and Tariff Bureau
- Financial Bureau
- International Bureau

== Independent Administrative Institutions ==
Six Independent Administrative Institutions are under the Ministry's control:

- Japan Mint
- National Printing Bureau
- National Research Institute of Brewing
- Nippon Automated Cargo Clearance System
- Commemorative Organization for the Japan World Exposition '70
- Japan Housing Finance Agency

== Incidents ==
- In March 2018 Toshio Akagi, an employee of the ministry's Kinki Local Finance Bureau, committed suicide after being forced to tamper with documents related to the sale of government owned land to school operator Moritomo Gakuen, a transaction defended by the ministry despite the resulting scandal. His wife began collecting signatures online for a petition to investigate the truth about Akagi's suicide. As of 2020, she had gathered around 290,000 signatures.

== See also ==
- Minister of Finance (Japan)
- Monetary and fiscal policy of Japan
- Ministry of International Trade and Industry
- National Tax Agency
