= 500 yen note =

Japanese yen note

- Country: Japan
- Value: 500 Japanese yen
- Security features: Watermarks
- Years of printing: 1945–1946 (Note: First issue series (い号券) notes from 1945 and 1946 were printed but never issued.); 1951–1994

Obverse
- Design: Iwakura Tomomi

Reverse
- Design: Mount Fuji

The 500 yen note (五百円紙幣) is a discontinued denomination of Japanese yen issued from 1951 to 1994 in paper form. Crudely made notes were first made in an unsuccessful attempt to curb inflation at the time, and the series as a whole is broken down into four different types of note. Only the last two were released for circulation which feature Iwakura Tomomi on the obverse, and Mount Fuji on the reverse. Starting in 1982, new 500 yen coins began to be minted which eventually replaced their paper counterparts. While the production of 500 yen notes continued until 1984, all of the notes issued were officially withdrawn from circulation in 1994. Five hundred yen notes were allowed to retain their legal tender status.

== Origins ==
The first 500 yen notes (aka: First issue series (い号券)) originate in the chaotic aftermath of World War II. During this time (1945 aka Shōwa 20) there was an increased demand for banknotes in Japan as rapid inflation took hold. In anticipation of defeat, 500 yen notes were actually planned for the end of the war and production began immediately afterwards. Although the denomination was extremely high at the time these notes were made using offset printing. Between November 30, 1945 and February 21, 1946, 23,747,000 notes numbered 1 to 8 were produced but not issued to the public. The design for these first 500 yen notes features a portrait of Takenouchi no Sukune in the center of the obverse, with an ancient arabesque relief pattern on the background. Reverse features include a colorful pattern, arabesque patterns, and a floral design. The portrait of Takenouchi no Sukune on the obverse was reproduced from different denominations of banknotes, and the other designs are a combination of the plates of other banknotes produced by the Printing Bureau. These previous designs include "series 2" 200 yen notes, those from the Bank of Chōsen, and those from the Bank of Taiwan."

These banknotes measure 97mm in height, 168mm in width, and also feature two seals on the obverse: "Governor's Seal" and "Director of the Issuing Bureau." The serial number is printed in red and contains only a set number (symbol), while the nameplate on the note reads "Manufactured by the Printing Bureau of the Empire of Japan". A watermark with a paulownia design in white was also added for security purposes. Printing was ceased after February 21, 1946 due to an inspection of the market by the Minister of Finance, Keizo Shibusawa. Upon inspecting the printing process, Shibusawa realized that they were of such poor and shabby quality that issuing them would incite inflationary sentiment among the public and give the impression of a decline in Japan's national power. This along with raised concerns about counterfeiting led to an announcement that note issuance was postponed. The entire issuance except for proofs (specimen notes) was later cancelled and destroyed as the Supreme Commander for the Allied Powers prohibited the Imperial Japanese government from printing additional currency.

== Series A ==
In the aftermath of World War II, the Japanese government also considered issuing 500 yen "Series A" (A五百円券) notes. Like the "first issue series" these were intended to address the Japanese post-war inflation problem. The obverse design was to feature two circular ovals containing a statue of Maitreya at Kōryū-ji on the left and Aureola with Chrysanthemums of a Buddha statue at Hōryū-ji. Intended designs on the reverse included Tuan Shan and Cypress fan prototypes. These designs as a whole were solicited from the public which included private businesses such as Toppan. Ultimately, this series was never printed as the Supreme Commander for the Allied Powers refused to approve their publication. Concerns raised at the time included worsening the inflation situation and their potential use on the black market. Although the chosen 500 yen designs were considered to be diverted to 100 yen "Series A" (A五百円券) notes, other designs for these latter notes were chosen instead.

== Series B ==
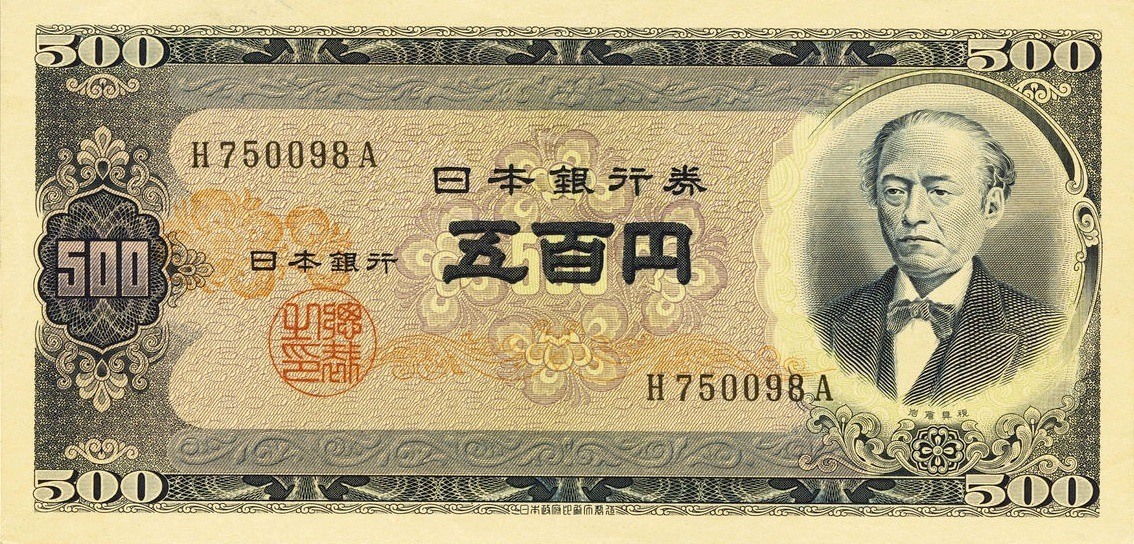
500 Yen "B series" note (front)

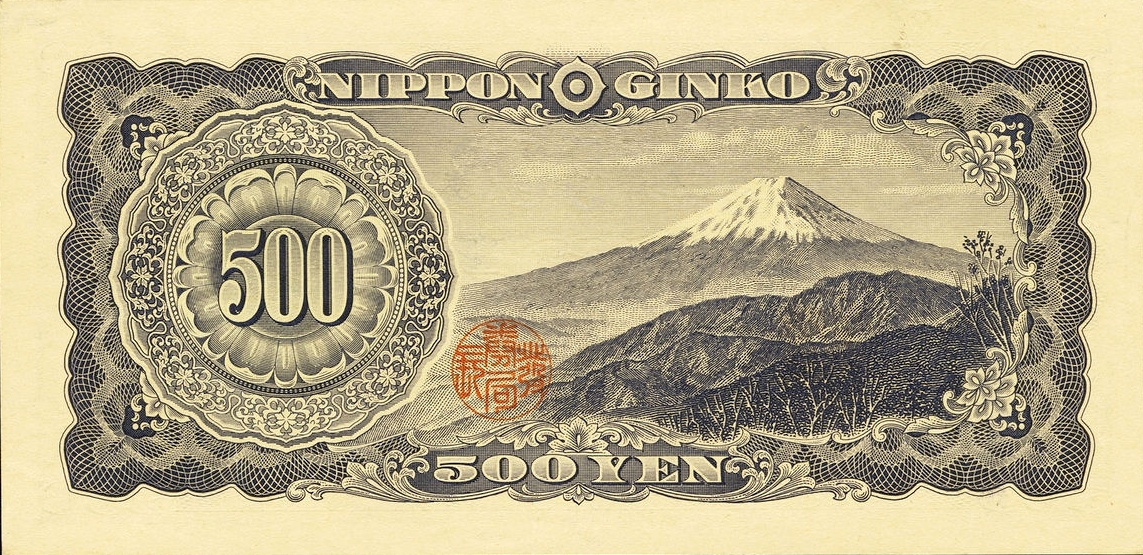
Back of the "B series" note

The first series of 500 yen notes to circulate (called "series B") were released on April 2, 1951 in order to fill the gap between 100 and 1000 yen notes. This was intended to relieve the production of (A series) 100 yen notes which accounted for 60% of the total amount of bills printed at the time. As post-war inflation persisted during this era, higher denominated notes were constantly in demand. Series B 500-yen notes feature a portrait of Iwakura Tomomi on the obverse which was modeled after another portrait of him in Meiji era court dress. The inner grey shaded pattern towards the top and bottom of the note was modeled after the metal fittings used on the Tamamushi Shrine. Centered in the note, a floral design is used which is based on another design featured on a "treasure" at Shōsōin. Additionally, the micro words "500" and "Bank of Japan" are included on the left and right sides. The picture of Mount Fuji predominantly displayed on the reverse was originally taken by photographer Natori Kyūsaku (名取久作) from the summit of another nearby mountain. This is accompanied by a lotus pattern where the face value "500" is displayed. Security features include a wild chrysanthemum pattern and "500" watermark which is difficult to obverse as it overlaps with the printing.

Prior to World War II, the paper used for Japanese banknotes was made from bleached oriental paperbush. When the post-war demand for paperbush increased, other elements such as abacá, cotton, and urea resin were mixed in. This effected paper quality during production as earlier notes feature a cream colored hue which later changed to white. Six colors in total are used on the obverse side which include 1 for the main pattern by intaglio printing, 3 for the interior patterns, 1 for the seal, and 1 for the "500" number. The three colors used on the reverse side include the main intaglio printing, 1 for the lotus pattern, and 1 for the seal. Overall, a darker blue/black intaglio hue was chosen for the main pattern in order to improve the distinctiveness of the "B series" notes from the earlier "A series" issue. From January 16, 1951 to June 27, 1969 a total of 2,219,000,000 banknotes from the 500 yen "B series" were printed by the National Printing Bureau.

Finally being withdrawn on January 4, 1971.

== Series C ==
The final 500 yen notes are referred to as "series C" notes, and were issued starting on November 1, 1969 with new watermarks to enhance security. The issue came to an end on April 1, 1994 when 500 yen notes were withdrawn from circulation.

== Gallery ==
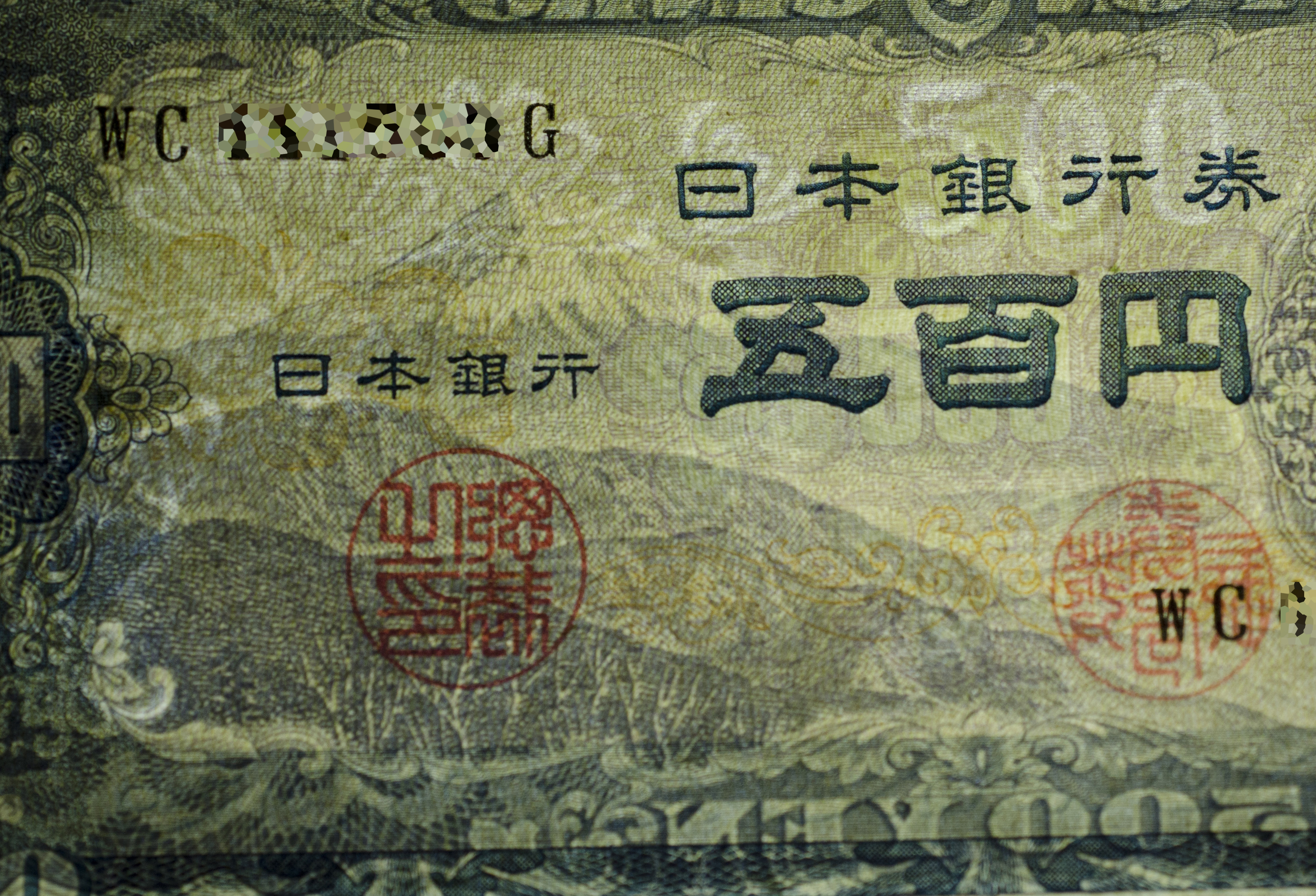
Close-up of the watermark security feature used on the "B series"

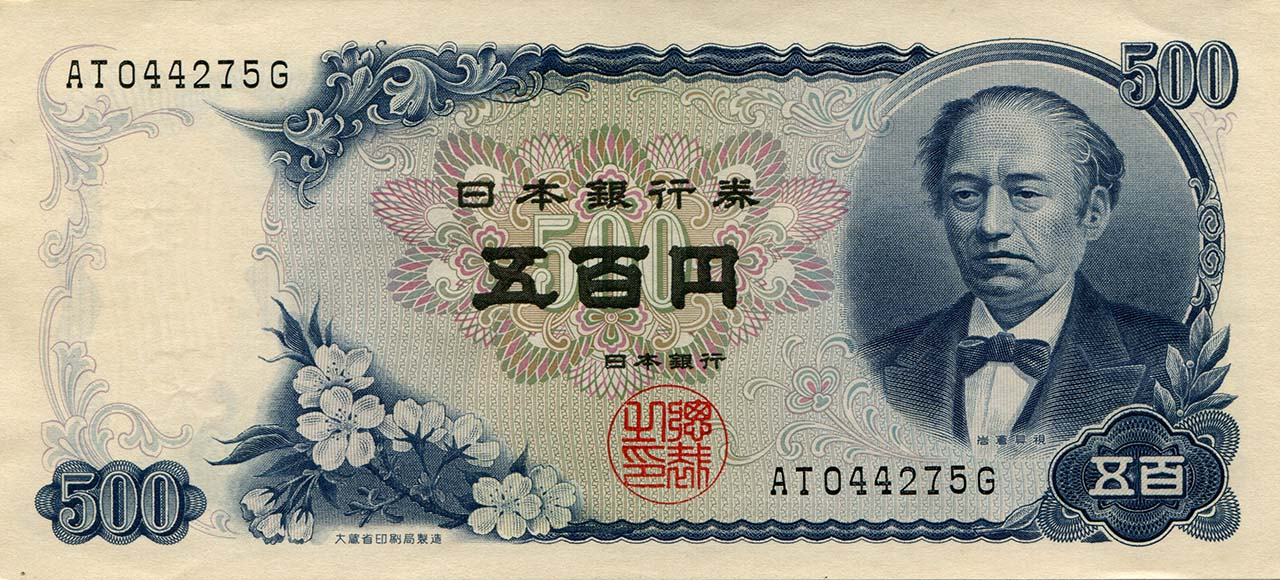
500 Yen "C series" note (front)
Issued 1969 to 1994

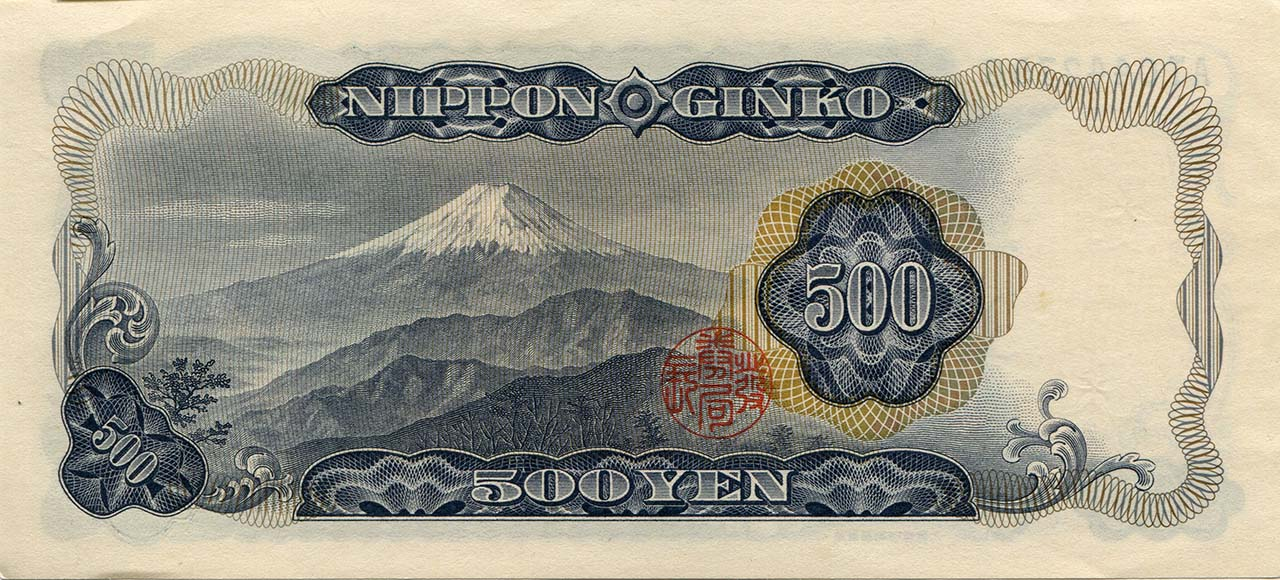
Back of the "C series" note

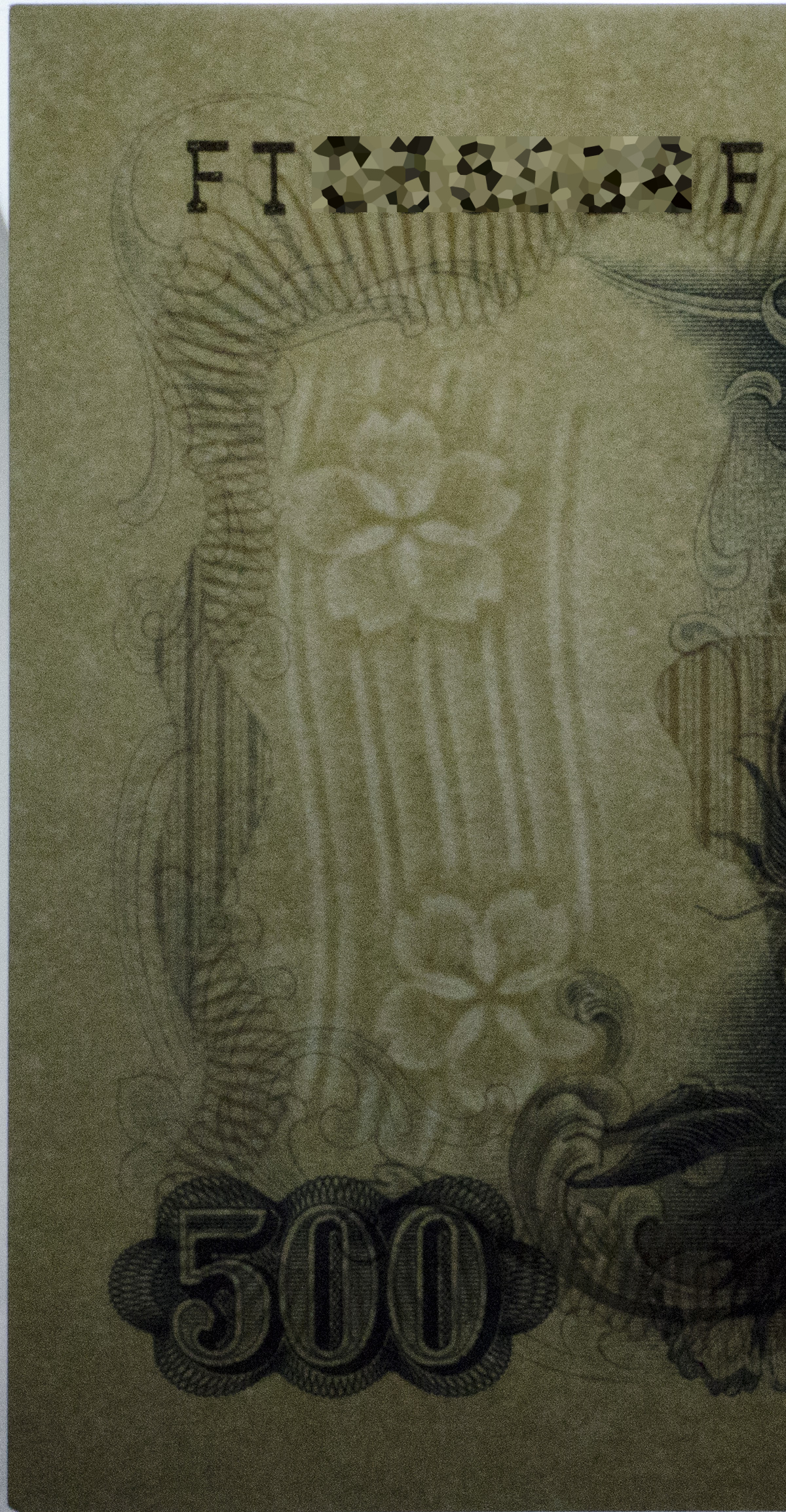
Close-up of the watermark security feature used on the "C series"

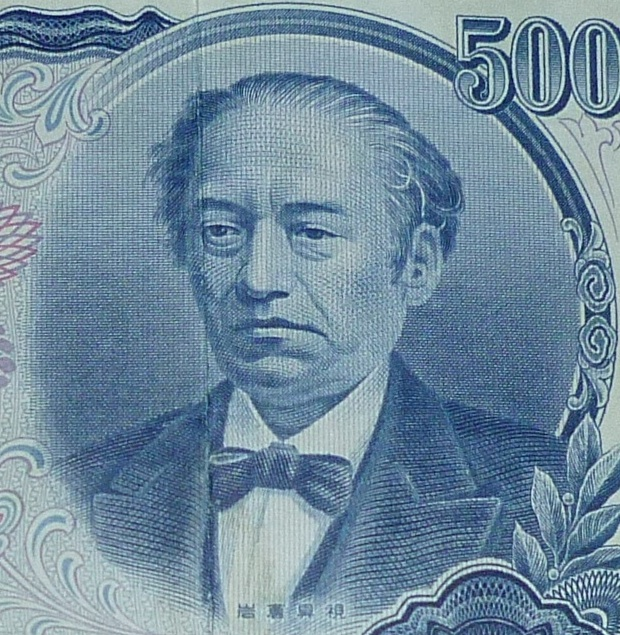
Close-up of Iwakura Tomomi on the obverse of the "C series"

== See also ==
- Banknotes of the Japanese yen
- 500 euro note
- Hong Kong five hundred-dollar note
- Indian 500-rupee note
- Large denominations of United States currency
- Philippine five hundred peso note
