= 200 yen note =

Japanese yen note

- Country: Japan
- Value: 200 Japanese yen
- Security features: Watermarks
- Years of printing: 1927–1946

Obverse
- Design: Various

Reverse
- Design: Various

The 200 yen note (二百円紙幣) was a denomination of Japanese yen issued from 1927 to 1946. These issues were broken up into three different designs including one which has two different varieties. For reasons unknown, 200 yen banknotes were not issued when they were first authorized. They were ultimately issued as a hopeful remedy during a financial emergency that took place in 1927. While both the first and second series were printed for the emergency, the latter of these were placed in storage until the end of World War II. After the war, the second series was released with a third. However, by this time things were changing in Japan's monetary system. Currency could no longer be converted into gold coins making the messages on the long unreleased second series notes obsolete. The series ended in 1946, when 200 yen notes were demonetized due to changes in Japan's monetary system. These notes are now regarded as collectables which trade on the marketplace for amounts dependent on condition and rarity.

== History ==
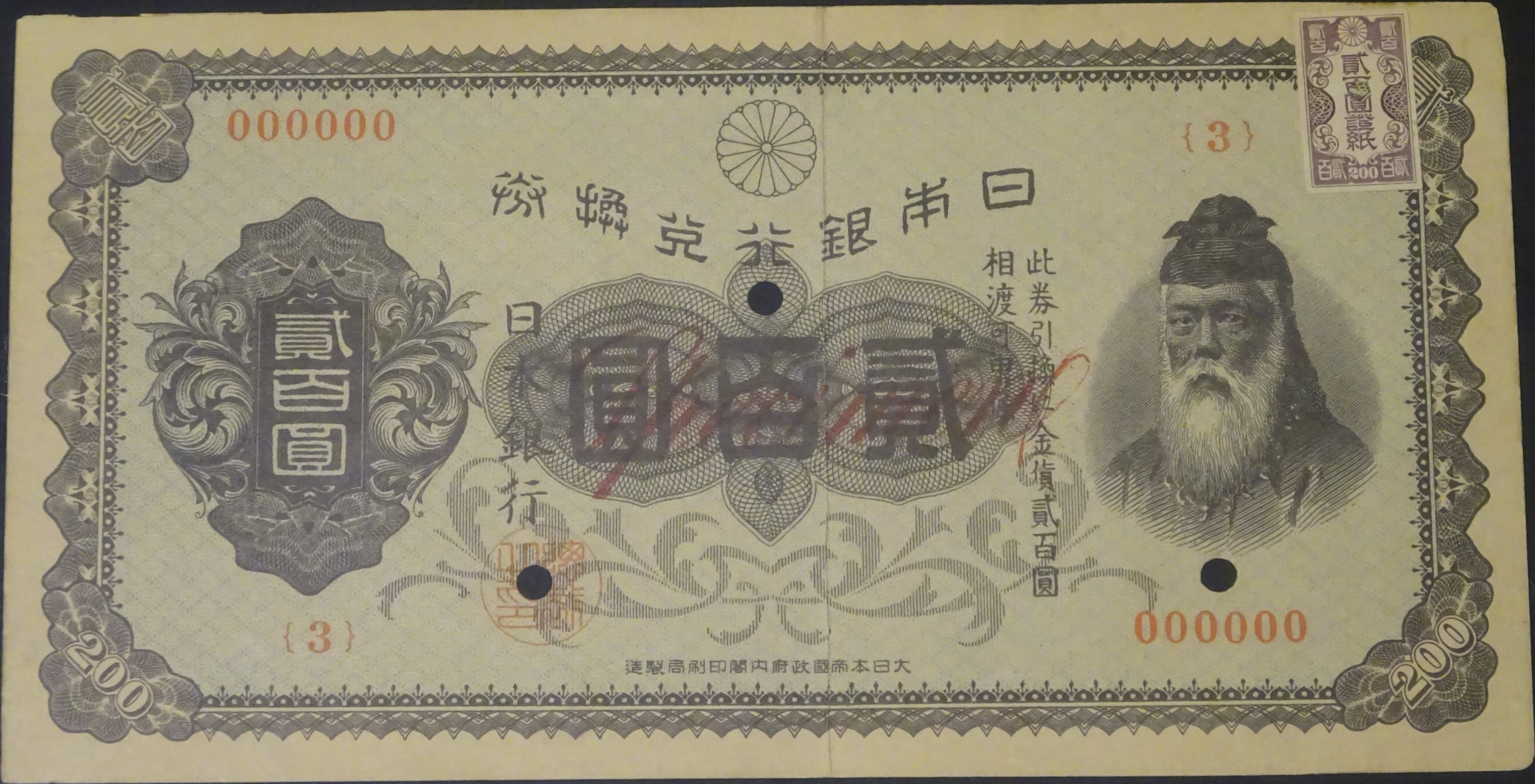
Series 1927 "200 Yen" proof (test) note

Two hundred yen banknotes were first authorized by law on June 27, 1882, with Article 14 of the Bank of Japan. For one reason or another no notes were issued, the U.S. Government Printing Office acknowledged this by adding a footnote as late as 1901 stating: "none have ever been issued". The Shōwa financial crisis of 1927 ultimately was the catalyst for the first series of two hundred yen bills. These were printed in a hurry as the Bank of Japan needed bills to be exchanged with other banks to insure against bank runs. With banks in the country all temporarily closed, the printing office took the opportunity to manufacture the new bills. The normal printing process for the notes could not be carried out as it took too long to print both sides. This led the printing office to choose a simple design printed on one side which the public nicknamed "Urashiro" or "back white" notes. In order to ease public fear of fraud, the Bank of Japan vice president confidently stated that: "although it looks somewhat flimsy, it has the Bank of Japan watermark so there is no fear that it is counterfeit". Despite his sentiment some of the notes were rejected as possible fakes due to their rough printing on the side that had features. Although 106,000 yen's worth of the 200 yen bill were reported to be in circulation at the end of 1927, two years later the notes had largely disappeared from use.

Notes of the second series were announced by the Ministry of Finance in 1927, and were printed that year in two different varieties. These all feature legendary Japanese hero-statesman Takenouchi no Sukune on the obverse. Their "Uraaka" nickname though, was coined by the public due to a red pattern featured on the reverse. The first variety has a black on green underprint on the obverse side. These were marked with the printed word "SPECIMEN" in red script on the reverse. Second variety notes can be differentiated by a pale blue underprint on the obverse which features a different color and shape of the central guilloche. There is no mention of the word "SPECIMEN" on the reverse side which has a slightly different red back pattern. A majority of the second series banknotes were held back in vaults until the end of World War II. There is a message on the obverse side of both varieties that mentions "Bond convertible". By the time the second series was finally issued on August 16, 1945, this message had become obsolete as the system of converting banknotes into gold coins had been suspended in 1942.

Series three notes feature Fujiwara no Kamatari on the obverse next to Danzan Shrine, the reverse designs are printed in blue ink which includes a different view of the shrine. These notes were originally part of an overall banknote redesign which took place in 1930. This final series was all issued after World War II had ended, and saw light circulation due to the purchasing power the note had at the time. Series two and three notes were both short lived circulating issues as they would both expire within a year. On March 2, 1946, a new law was passed which demonetized all of Japan's old currency, this effectively stripped every 200 yen note of their legal tender status. (Note: Financial institutions accepted old bills as deposits until March 7, 1946. The redemption process of old notes for new ones (excluding 200 yen notes) had been ongoing since the end of February 1946.)

== Collecting ==
Notes printed in 1927 for the first series are very rare today as very few were issued. Specimen banknotes are among the few examples available for collectors to obtain, with prices ranging from $19,550 (USD) in "about uncirculated" condition, to $33,600 (USD) for a "gem" example. Two hundred yen notes of the second series have two different varieties, and first variety notes are considered to be extremely rare. The second variety had a print run of 7.5 million notes which were stocked in the vaults, making them more available to collectors. These notes have been sold at auction in the hundreds of dollars to the low thousands depending on condition. Series three notes are also more available to collectors, and sell for lesser amounts online.

== In popular culture ==
The announcement of redesigned "Series F" banknotes for release in 2024 inspired a Japanese artist to create 200 yen bank notes using a kitten theme.

== See also ==
- Banknotes of the Japanese yen
- 2000 yen note
