= Anglo-Egyptian Bank =

Former bank

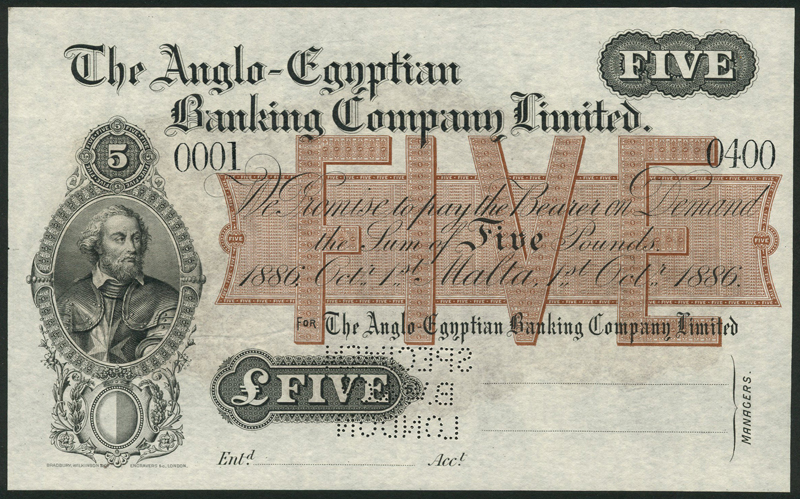
A specimen £5 banknote emitted by the Malta branch of the Anglo-Egyptian Bank

The Anglo-Egyptian Bank, was a British overseas bank established in 1864.

== History ==
The founding banks were Agra and Masterman's Bank, La Compagnie Financière Maurice de Cattauï and the General Credit and Finance Co., and the bank incorporated Pastré Frères et Compagnie (est. 1821; reorganized 1827 by Eugène Pastré) and Giovanni Sinadino and Co., which was the only one of the four to have its seat in Egypt, in Alexandria. The senior officials of all four firms sat on the first board of directors.

In addition to its activities in Egypt, the Anglo-Egyptian opened branches in the British Mediterranean, where it frequently acted as banker to the British authorities.

The Anglo-Egyptian Bank issued banknotes for Malta in 1886.

1895, a notice signed by the secretary of the bank, William Hart, states the head office is located on Lombard Street, London, with branches in Alexandria, Cairo, Gibraltar, Malta, and Rue Lafayette of Paris

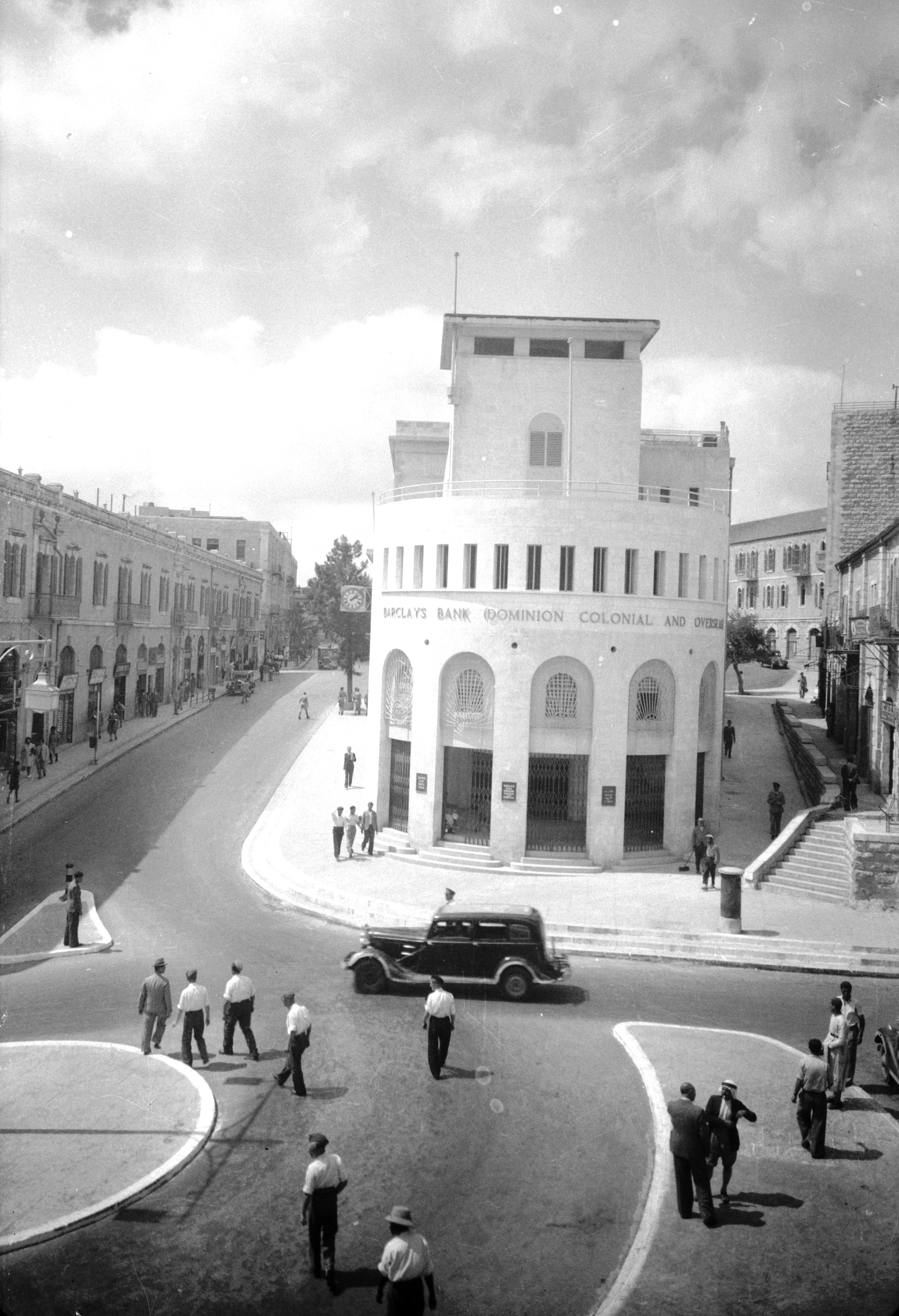
Barclays Bank (Dominion, Colonial and Overseas) branch in Jerusalem, circa 1940

Until 1920 the Cattauï family had a controlling interest in Anglo-Egyptian. Then in 1921 Barclays Bank initially acquired 15% of the bank before acquiring the Cattauï family's interest in 1924, which made Barclay's the majority stakeholder in Anglo-Egyptian. In 1925, Barclays Bank merged Anglo-Egyptian with Colonial Bank and National Bank of South Africa to form Barclays Bank (Dominion, Colonial and Overseas). In 1956, following the Anglo-French attack on Port Said, the Egyptian government sequestrated the 19 branches, one sub-branch, and 26 agencies in Egypt, using them to found Alexbank.

== Timeline ==
=== Acquisition ===
- 1884 Anglo-Egyptian purchased the accounts of the liquidated Commercial Bank of Alexandria, which had been established in 1868.

=== Branch openings and closings ===
- 1864 Alexandria
- 1878 Larnaca and Nicosia
- 1881 Malta
- 1888 Gibraltar
- 1890 The bank closed the branches in Cyprus and Port Saïd.
- 1913 Khartoum. After nationalization in 1970, the operations in Sudan became part of Bank of Khartoum.
- 1918 Jerusalem and Jaffa
- 1921 The Musky, a commercial district in Cairo.
- 1925 Anglo-Egyptian had 16 branches in all.

== See also ==
- Israel Discount Bank
- Banknotes of the Anglo-Egyptian Banking Company Limited (Malta)

== Citations & references ==
Citations

References Samir Saul (1994) From the Anglo-Egyptian Bank to Barclays (DCO): A Century of Overseas Banking. In M. Davids, F. Proceedings of the Conference on Business History, Rotterdam, The Netherlands. de Goey, D. De Wit (eds.),

== Bibliography ==
- Egypt sets new targets for banking sector after moving to free-floating currency, published by Oxford Business Group - accessed 2020-02-14
- Anglo Egyptian Bank, published by Barclays PLC - accessed 2020-02-14
- Barclays Bank International, formerly Barclays Bank (Dominion, Colonial & Overseas) and Barclays Bank D.C.O. published by Barclays Group Archives (BGA) - accessed 2020-02-14
- (shows errata "1827") Lot: 79, published by Spink & Son - accessed 2020-02-14
