= Slug (coin) =

Object used as a counterfeit coin

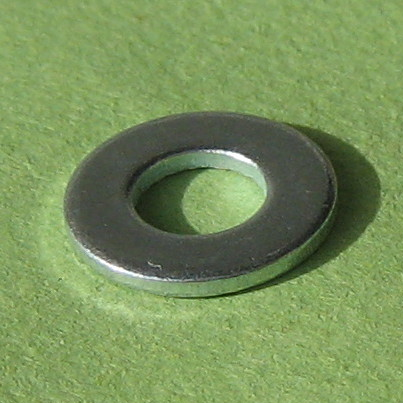
A plain metal washer, if of the correct size and weight, may be accepted as a coin by a vending machine.

A slug is a counterfeit coin that is illegally used to make purchases. The object substituted may be an inexpensive object such as a washer or a coin from another country with far lower purchasing power than the coin it is being passed off as.

While slugs are sometimes passed off to cashiers and other unwitting human recipients, they are more commonly used in automated coin-operated devices such as a vending machine, payphone, parking meter, transit farebox, copy machine, coin laundry, gaming machine, or arcade game. By resembling various features of a genuine coin, including the weight, size, and shape, and/or by mixing it with genuine coinage a slug is intended to trick the recipient into accepting it as a real coin.

Losses caused to vendors by slug usage may be the result of the loss of sales revenue following the distribution of merchandise that was obtained at the vendor's expense as well as the loss of cash that is distributed by the machine for overpayment with slugs. Honest customers may also suffer losses when change returned for overpayment is in the form of a slug rather than a genuine coin. Customer losses may be either unintentional on the part of merchants (such as when perpetrated by unwitting cashiers or machines designed to automatically process previous payments as change for later customers) or the result of the deliberate substitution of genuine coinage by corrupt cashiers and vending machine operators.

Though slug usage is illegal in the United States and elsewhere, prosecution for slug usage is rare due to the low value of each theft, the difficulty in identifying an offender, and also the difficulty in proving mens rea (especially when the slug is another country's genuine coin) since perpetrators when confronted will often claim the substitution was an "honest" mistake. Offenders in casinos are most likely to be prosecuted, as casinos have high levels of video surveillance and other security measures, and tend to be more proactive in enforcement.

== Use of other currencies ==
There are many cases of genuine coins being used as slugs in another country, with or without knowledge of the user.

- Until 2006, the Australian and New Zealand 5-, 10- and 20-cent pieces (previously sixpence, shilling, and florin, respectively) were used interchangeably in both countries. These coins were of the same material and size (descending from their colonial pasts), with almost identical obverses (both featuring portraits of their then-head of state, Queen Elizabeth II). The New Zealand coins were worth about 20% less, resulting in a small gain to those passing them in Australia and a similar loss in New Zealand.
- The 10–Syrian pound coin is often used as a slug in Norway, where it resembles the 20-krone coin. While not easy to find in Norway, the Syrian coins are used in automated machines there so often that Posten Norge, the Norwegian postal service, decided to close many of their coins-to-banknotes machines on February 18, 2006, with plans to develop a system able to differentiate between the two coins. In the summer of 2005, a Norwegian man was sentenced to 30 days, suspended, for using Syrian coins in arcade machines in the municipality of Bærum.
- The use of 100 won coins as a slug for 100 yen coins is still common, contributing to conflict between Japanese and South Korean citizens. Similarly, until 2000, the South Korean 500 won coin could be modified to match the weight of the original 500 yen coin which was otherwise identical in diameter and composition, and thereby used to fool weight-sensitive vending machines. The 100-won coin could also serve as a slug for a US quarter.
- From the fall of the Soviet Union to the monetary reform in 1998, the Russian Federation often issued a commemorative one-ruble coin that was identical in size and weight to a 5 Swiss franc coin. For this reason, there have been several instances of these (worthless) ruble coins being used on a large scale to defraud automated vending machines in Switzerland.
- In 2002, the European Union introduced the bimetallic 2 euro coin that is quite similar to the Thai ten-baht coin (first issued in 1988) in weight, size and appearance. Because the Thai coin is worth one eighth of the EU coin, it has been used to fool cashiers and automated vending machines since the introduction of physical euro currency. The same coin is also used in Hong Kong due to its similarity with the Hong Kong ten-dollar coin despite being worth a quarter of the latter's value.
- In the United Arab Emirates, it became publicly known in August 2006 that the Filipino one-peso coin had the same size as the one Emirati dirham coin. With one dirham having a value of nearly 14 pesos, this has led to vending machine fraud in the United Arab Emirates.
- In 2009, Turkey introduced a new coin series in which the sizes and compositions of the 50kr. and ₺1 coins strongly resembled those of the €1 and €2 coins respectively. It also caused trouble to businesses using vending machines (particularly at airports) in the eurozone since a number of vending machines at the time accepted the ₺1 coin as a €2 coin. Since €2 was worth roughly four times more than the ₺1 coin, vending machines affected had to be upgraded at the expense of their owners.
- Before a change of design in 2017, the Swaziland 1L lilangeni coin could be used as a slug in vending machines in the place of a round £1 sterling coin in the United Kingdom, due to both coins being made by The Royal Mint to the same specifications.

== Composition ==
Slugs are usually made from metals differing from those of real coins. While genuine US coinage is made from various alloys of copper, nickel and zinc, Canadian coins are made mostly from steel with some copper and nickel, and euro coins are made from steel, nickel, and brass, slugs are frequently made from differing metals and alloys that are cheaper to obtain and mold, such as aluminum, tin, and lead.

Slugs may or may not have the face details of real coins. Some slugs that are made to match the face details may not be immediately recognizable as such to handlers, and may enter circulation.

Older, cheaper, and other low-tech machines that have fewer security measures are more likely to be defrauded by slug users. As an example, the fully mechanical mechanisms used in the traditional type of small vending machines that distribute candy or toys, and that can still often be found today at the entrances and/or exits of grocery stores and other retailers, can be fooled by cardboard coins. Many newer machines, especially those found in casinos, have additional detection that can identify more details of coins and detect those that do not resemble real coins.

== See also ==
- Coin counterfeiting
- Coin rolling scams
- Counterfeit money
- Gresham's law
