= 500 yen coin =

Highest circulating denomination of Japanese yen coinage

Five hundred yen
- Japan
- Value: 500 Japanese yen
- Mass: 7.1 g
- Diameter: 26.5 mm
- Thickness: 1.81 mm
- Edge: Reeded
- Composition: Bi-metallic; 75% Cu; 12.5% Zn; 12.5% Ni
- Years of minting: 1982–present
- Catalog number: Y-87, Y-99.2, Y-125

Obverse
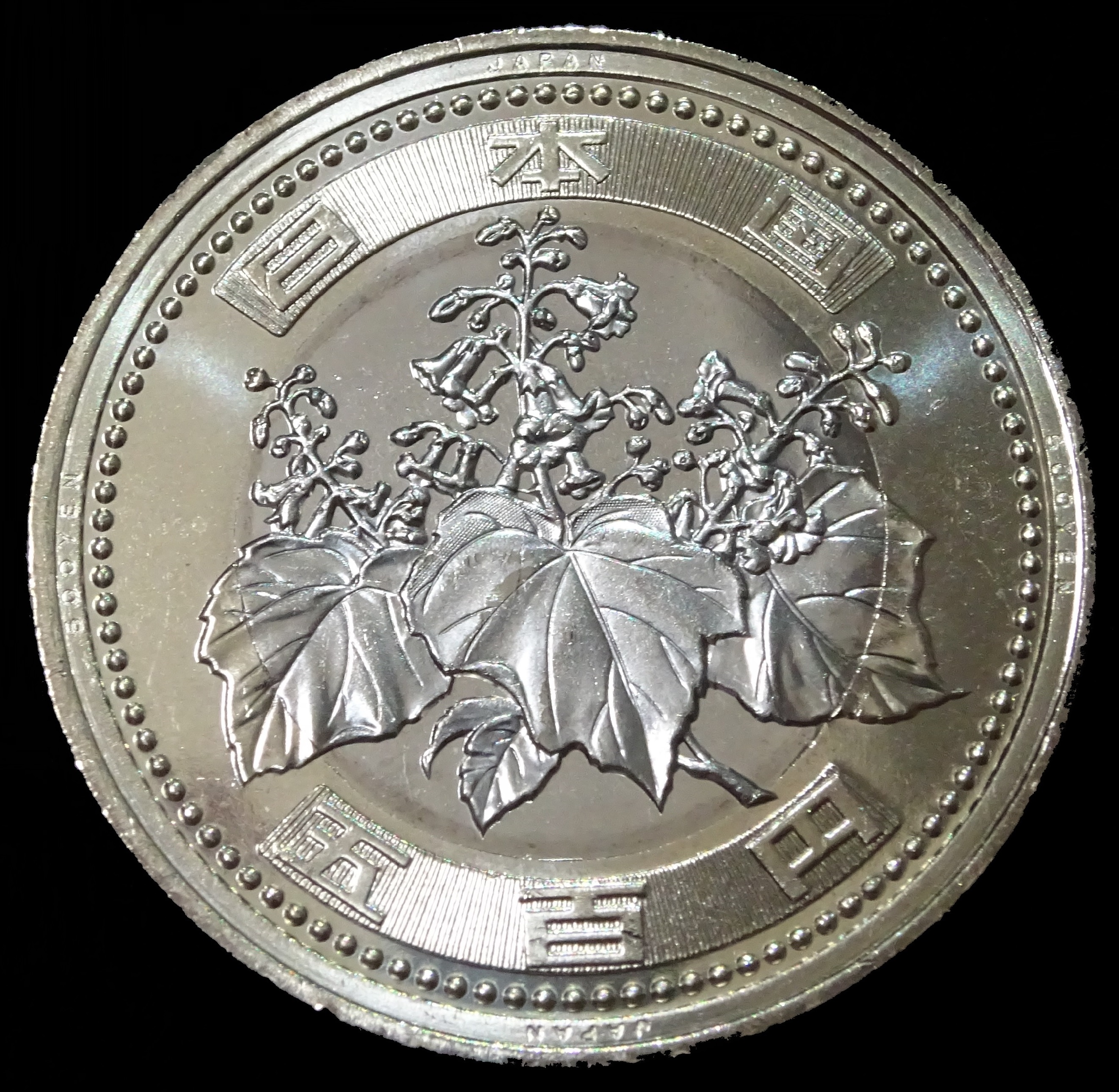
- Design: Paulownia
- Design date: 2021

Reverse
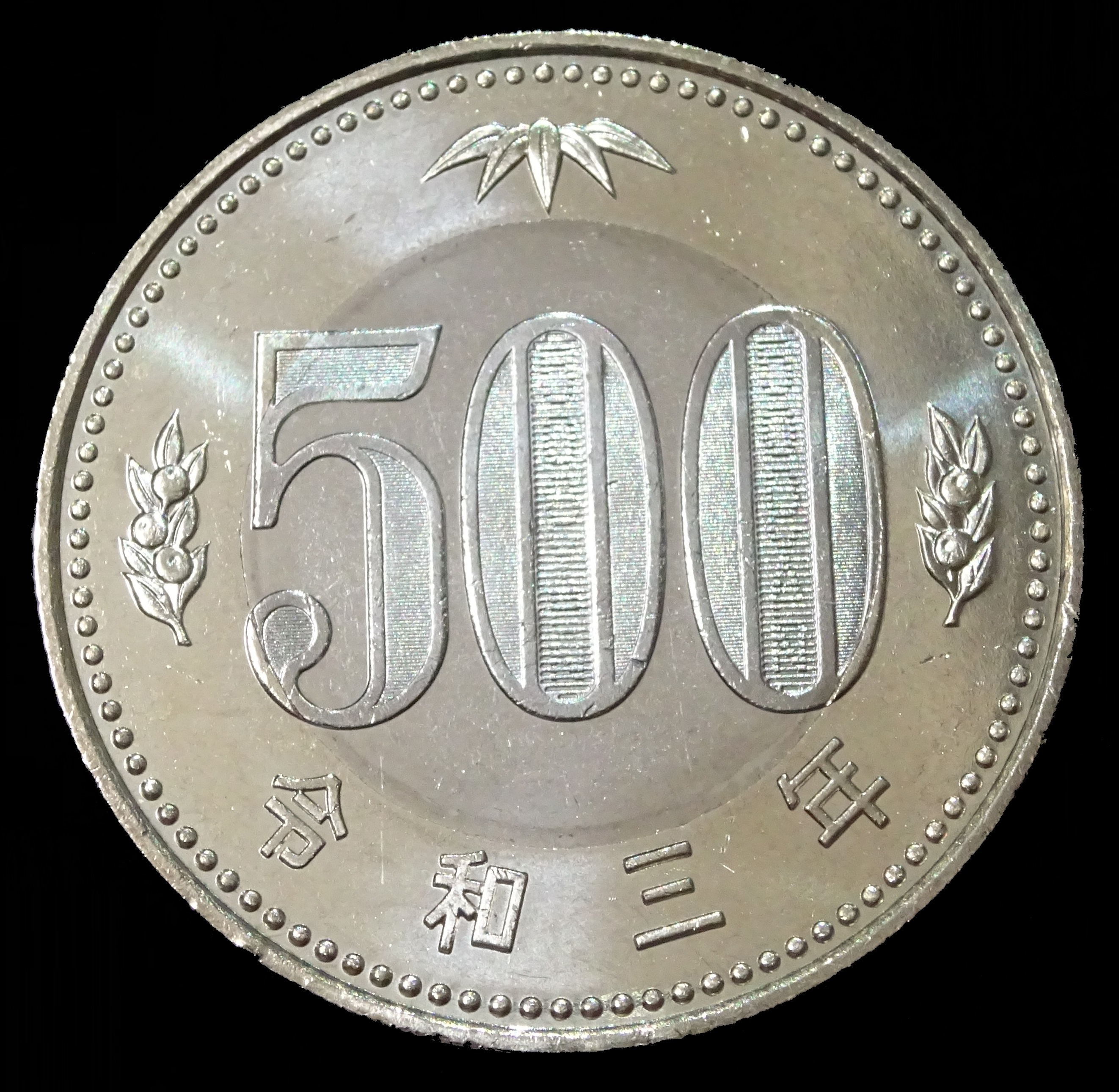
- Design: Denomination with bamboo and tachibana oranges
- Design date: 2021

The 500 yen coin (Japanese: 五百円硬貨, Hepburn: Gohyaku-en kōka) is the largest denomination of Japanese yen coin issued for circulation. These coins were first struck in 1982 as the vending machine industry needed a higher valued coin for use in their machines. The denomination had previously been issued as paper currency which co-circulated with the new coins until 1994. Originally the 500 yen coin was made up of cupronickel, but was later changed to nickel brass, and then to bi-metallic to deter counterfeiting. With a history spanning 3 imperial eras, 500 yen coins are also collectibles.

== History ==
=== Cupronickel yen ===
The 500 yen coin was first minted in 1982 as another coin denomination was needed for use in vending machines. The obverse of the cupronickel based 500 yen coin features a paulownia crest, while the reverse is designed with bamboo and Tachibana. These elements were chosen as they are regarded as symbols of good luck and people were already familiar with seeing them on the 500 yen notes. The diameter of the coin was set at 26.5 mm with a measured thickness of 1.85 mm. The inscription "NIPPON 500" was placed on the rim. As with other denominations created in the post World War II era, the newly issued coins circulated concurrently with their paper money counterparts. When the 500 yen coin was placed into circulation it acted as a replacement for the bill, which became supplementary currency. The 500 yen bill was phased out in 1984 in favor of the new coins, co-circulation continued until 1994 when the bills were withdrawn from circulation. (Note: The 500 yen note still retains legal tender status.) Towards the end of Emperor Shōwa's (Hirohito's) reign mintage figures fell for the 500 yen coin. An all time low came when only 2,775,000 coins were minted in 1987 (year 62). The production of cupronickel 500 yen coins ended in 1999 due to incidents of counterfeit coins being used to rig vending machines.

=== Nickel-brass yen ===
The second design for the 500 yen coin was first minted in 2000 with new anti-counterfeiting devices. Nickel-brass was used as a replacement for cupronickel giving the coins a slightly golden appearance in comparison. This metallic change made it easier for vending machines to tell the difference between genuine versus counterfeit coins. The weight of the 500 yen coin was lowered from 7.2g to 7, and the thickness from 1.85 to 1.81 mm. Changes also effected the edge as the inscriptions of "NIPPON 500" were replaced with a helically reeded edge. The overall design was not changed but enhanced with anti-counterfeiting technology which include microprinting, and features viewed only at certain angles. This design later won the Mint Directors Conference award in 2002 as the "Most Innovative Coin Concept". But counterfeiters switched to using raw materials to get around the new security features. While in April 2019 the Ministry of Finance announced that the 500 yen coin would be redesigned, the new coins weren't released into circulation until November 2021.

=== Bi-metallic yen ===
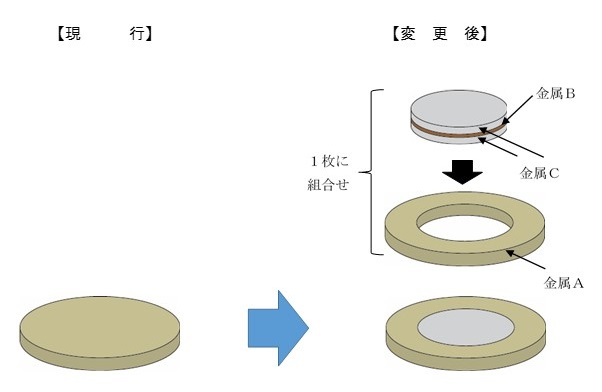
Structure of the bi-metallic yen. (Note: A: outer nickel brass ring, B: inner copper core, C: outer nickel core.)

The most recent 500 yen coins feature a bi-metallic three-layer structure that is also used for European coinage. One major difference are the edges of the coins, which use contour edging that utilize helical ridges with varied shaping. Two different colors are visible when looking at the coin giving it the name "bicolor clad". The center of the coin is made up of a silvery cupronickel, while the outer ring is golden nickel-brass. Aside from an increase in weight of 0.1g the coin's diameter remains the same as it has been since 1982. The overall design is the same except for a missing bamboo leaf under "500" which is replaced by the date (era). Enhanced features such as "JAPAN" and "500YEN" are also applied to the edge of the coin along with microprinting and angled features already present on the previous nickel brass issue.

The cost of redesigning the 500 yen coin was estimated to be 490 billion yen as it required the refurbishment of cash handling equipment. The COVID-19 pandemic pushed back schedules to circulate the coin which had initially been between April and September 2021. Other factors such as modifying vending machines and automated teller machines to accept the coins added to the delay. The new coins were finally released into circulation in early November 2021. This release did not invalidate old coins already in circulation as the cupronickel and nickel-brass coins are still considered legal tender. While these coins are still valid, vending machines may no longer accept them due to their metallic signature. (Note: Vending machines are programmed to recognize coins by the electrical conductivity given off by alloys.) There continues to be a strong demand for 500 yen coins, and they are unlikely to be affected by electronic money.

== Designs ==
Image	Minted	Diameter	Weight	Composition	Edge
	1982–1999	26.5 mm	7.2g	75% copper, 25% nickel	Lettered
	2000–2021	26.5 mm	7.0g	72% copper, 20% zinc, 8% nickel	Reeded slantingly
	2021–present	26.5 mm	7.1g	75% copper, 12.5% nickel, 12.5% zinc	Reeded helically

== Counterfeiting issues ==
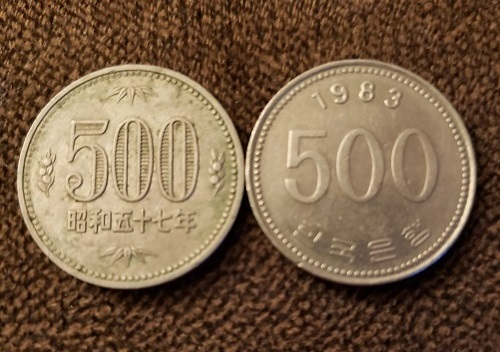
Japanese 500 yen coin (left) next to a similar South Korean 500 won coin (right)

When the 500 yen coin debuted it was the highest nominally valued coin in the world. In comparison the coin's purchase power was about double that of a two-pound coin (UK) in 2012. These reasons have made 500 yen coins a prime choice for counterfeiters ever since they were first minted in 1982. Problems arose that year as South Korea introduced a coin worth 500 won (₩500) valued at about one tenth of the value of the 500 yen coin. Both coins are made up of the same cupronickel alloy and have the same 26.5 mm diameter. It did not take long before these coins were modified to be the exact weight of the 500 yen coin, nor was it difficult. Counterfeiters would use them as slugs by drilling small holes on the surface of the coin to reduce their weight and fool vending machines which relied on weight to identify the coins. The large gap in value between the two coins meant that these thieves could make a good profit.

By the 1990s vending machines full of these foreign coins had become a serious issue which dealt losses to the vending machine businesses and beyond. By the end of the decade 70% of the 5.5 million vending machines in Japan had stopped taking the coin. This did not deter counterfeits as between January and October 1999 police found 657,000 altered coins. The Japan Mint responded to these incidents beginning in 2000 with a new nickel brass based 500 yen coin featuring anti-counterfeiting devices. When viewed at different angles "500円" is either printed vertically in each zero, or a bar can be seen running down the inside of each zero. Microprinting reading "Nippon" is also found on both the obverse and reverse of the coin. Vending machines were then adapted to reject the old cupronickel 500 yen coins by having the machines only recognize the conductivity given off by the nickel brass used in the new coins. These second generation nickel brass coins were soon counterfeited as well by using raw materials. In 2005, an article in The Japan Times reported that the perpetrators deposited the coins in an account using an ATM, the money was then withdrawn in the form of banknotes. The coins involved were made up of the same alloy as genuine coins but the percentage of the alloys used were different.

By 2012, the counterfeit coins used were described as "extremely well crafted", again the perpetrators in another unrelated incident had used the fake 500 yen coins in ATM deposits. These high quality counterfeit coins were also realistic enough to trick the meters in coin-operated parking lots. In this incident the coins were thought to be connected to counterfeit Disney tickets which surfaced around the same time. The counterfeit 500 yen coins are believed to have originated in China or South Korea. In order to keep up with the anti-counterfeiting technology, 500 yen coins with enhanced features were released in November 2021. Counterfeiting currency as with other countries is a serious crime. In Japan, any person found guilty of knowingly using counterfeit currency is subject to imprisonment that ranges from three years to an "indefinite period".

== Circulation figures ==
=== Shōwa ===
The following are circulation dates which cover Emperor Hirohito's reign. The dates below correspond with the 57th to the 64th year (last) of his reign. Coins for this period will all begin with the Japanese symbol 昭和 (Shōwa).

- Japanese coins are read with a left to right format:

"Emperors name" → "Number representing year of reign" → "Year" (Ex: 昭和 → 五十八 → 年).

Year of reign	Japanese date	Gregorian date	Mintage (Note: Mintages on the Japan Mint website are in thousands)
57th	五十七	1982	300,000,000
58th	五十八	1983	240,000,000
59th	五十九	1984	342,850,000
60th	六十	1985	97,150,000
61st	六十一	1986	49,960,000
62nd	六十二	1987	2,775,000
63rd	六十三	1988	148,218,000
64th	六十四	1989	16,042,000

=== Heisei ===
The following are circulation dates during the reign of Emperor Akihito. who was crowned in 1989. The dates below correspond with the 1st to the 31st year (last) of his reign. First year of reign coins are marked with a 元 symbol (first) as a one year type. Coins for this period all begin with the Japanese symbol 平成 (Heisei).

- Japanese coins are read with a left to right format:

"Emperors name" → "Number representing year of reign" → "Year" (Ex: 平成 → 五 → 年).

Year of reign	Japanese date	Gregorian date	Mintage
1st	元	1989	192,852,000
2nd	二	1990	159,953,000
3rd	三	1991	170,120,000
4th	四	1992	88,130,000
5th	五	1993	132,240,000
6th	六	1994	105,772,000
7th	七	1995	182,869,000
8th	八	1996	99,213,000
9th	九	1997	173,090,000
10th	十	1998	214,608,000
11th	十一	1999	165,120,000
12th	十二	2000	595,969,000
13th	十三	2001	608,051,000
14th	十四	2002	504,661,000
15th	十五	2003	438,405,000
16th	十六	2004	356,903,000
17th	十七	2005	345,030,000
18th	十八	2006	381,593,000
19th	十九	2007	409,903,000
20th	二十	2008	432,811,000
21st	二十一	2009	343,003,000
22nd	二十二	2010	406,905,000
23rd	二十三	2011	301,936,000
24th	二十四	2012	267,211,000
25th	二十五	2013	137,892,000
26th	二十六	2014	167,013,000
27th	二十七	2015	143,004,000
28th	二十八	2016	221,064,000
29th	二十九	2017	426,327,000
30th	三十	2018	286,192,000
31st	三十一	2019	126,164,000

=== Reiwa ===
The following are circulation dates in the reign of the current Emperor. Naruhito's accession to the Chrysanthemum Throne took place on May 1, 2019 and he was formally enthroned on October 22, 2019. Coins for this period all begin with the Japanese symbol 令和 (Reiwa). The inaugural year coin (2019) was marked 元 (first) and debuted during the summer of that year.

- Japanese coins are read with a left to right format:

"Emperors name" → "Number representing year of reign" → "Year" (Ex: 令和 → 二 → 年).

Year of reign	Japanese date	Gregorian date	Mintage
1st	元	2019	76,956,000
2nd	二	2020	143,928,000
3rd	三	2021 (Nickel-brass)	184,711,000
3rd	三	2021 (Bi-metallic)	170,222,000
4th	四	2022	302,474,000
5th	五	2023	362,527,000
6th	六	2024	336,227,000
7th	七	2025	355,071,000
8th	八	2026	TBD

== Collecting ==
Most 500 yen coins made for circulation are worth only their face value due to high mintage figures throughout their history. Notable exceptions occurred during the end of Emperor Shōwa's (Hirohito's) reign when these figures fell. Only 2,775,000 coins were minted in 1987 (year 62) making it the lowest in the series and a key date. Coins made in 1989 (year 64) are also popular among collectors as the second lowest mintage of the series. Further interest of this date is gained by it being Emperor Shōwa's last year of reign that lasted only a week. These two coins sell for a premium online and through coin dealers depending on their condition. Collectors and the public alike similarly kept year 31 (2019) coins of all denominations as "Heisei Memorials".

== See also ==
- List of 500 yen commemorative coins
