= Iwakura Tomomi =

Japanese politician (1825–1883)

- 岩倉 具視
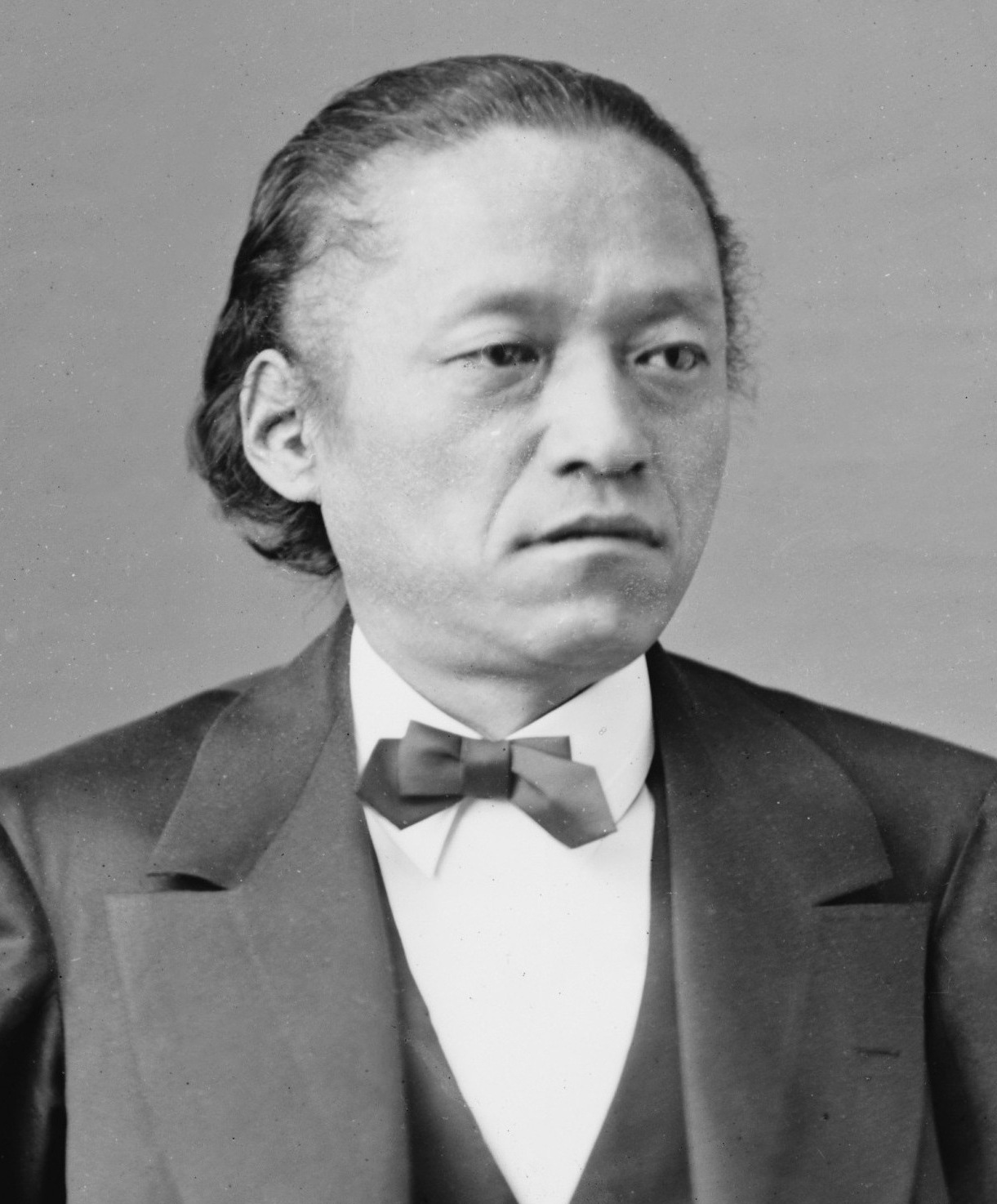

Minister of the Right
- In office 20 November 1871 – 20 July 1883
- Monarch: Meiji
- Chancellor: Sanjo Sanetomi
- Preceded by: Sanjo Sanetomi
- Succeeded by: Vacant

Minister for Foreign Affairs
- In office 29 August 1871 – 15 December 1871
- Monarch: Meiji
- Preceded by: Sawa Nobuyoshi
- Succeeded by: Soejima Taneomi

Personal details
- Born: 26 October 1825 Kyoto, Japan
- Died: 20 July 1883 (aged 57) Tokyo, Japan

Iwakura Tomomi (岩倉 具視; 26 October 1825 – 20 July 1883) was a Japanese statesman during the Bakumatsu and Meiji period. He was one of the leading figures of the Meiji Restoration, which saw the overthrow of the Tokugawa shogunate, the restoration of Japan's monarchy, and the abolition of feudalism, the domain system, and the samurai class.

Born to a lesser noble family, he was adopted by leading court noble Tomoyasu Iwakura (岩倉 具康) in 1838. In 1854, he became Imperial Chamberlain. Intending to bridge the divide between the shogunate and the imperial court, Iwakura openly supported marriage between Tokugawa Iemochi and Emperor Komei’s younger sister Princess Kazunomiya. This earned him derision as a shogunate supporter and in 1862, he was exiled. Iwakura returned to the court in 1867. He became the liaison between the court and the anti-Tokugawa movement and played a central role in the new Meiji government. He successfully opposed aggressive policies in Korea in the crisis of 1873, and was nearly assassinated by his enemies.

From 1871 to 1873, he led the 50-member Iwakura Mission for 18 months in Europe and America, studying modern institutions, technology, and diplomacy. The Mission promoted many key reforms that quickly modernized Japan. He promoted a strong imperial system along Western lines, and played a central role in creating financial institutions for the nation.

The discontinued 500 Yen banknote issued by the Bank of Japan carried his portrait. The note was first issued in 1951 and was circulated until 1994.

== Early life ==
Iwakura was born in Kyoto, the second son of low-ranking courtier and nobleman, Horikawa Yasuchika (堀川 康親). Through his mother, he was a first cousin of Emperor Ninkō and descended from the 10th-century Emperor Murakami. His childhood name was Kanemaru but fellow court nobles called him Iwakichi (typically thought of as a commoner's name). Confucian scholar Fusehara Nobuharu taught him Confucianism from childhood and suggested that Iwakura Tomoyasu (岩倉 具康) adopt Kanemaru as his child. Tomoyasu did this In 1836, giving Kanemaru his own family name. In 1838, the boy changed his name from Kanemaru to Tomomi. In bakumatsu, most of the 137 court nobles had a long tradition. In contrast, the Iwakura house had only become independent from the Koga house in the early Edo period. This newness gave the Iwakura house lower status. It did not have a family business, so they also had little money. Iwakura once showed his daring and disregard for the old customs of the nobility by making his home available as a gambling house in order to earn money. In 1839, when he was 14 years old, he had a coming-of-age ceremony and started to get involved in politics. He was trained by the kampaku Takatsukasa Masamichi and wrote the opinion for the imperial court reformation, arguing that the reserve fund should be used to expand and reform Gakushūin, and that promotion should be based on merit. In 1854 he became a chamberlain to Emperor Kōmei, his first cousin once removed.

== As court noble ==
As with most other courtiers in Kyoto, Iwakura opposed the Tokugawa shogunate's plans to end Japan's national isolation policy and to open Japan to foreign countries. When Hotta Masayoshi, a high ranking official of the Tokugawa government came to Kyoto to obtain imperial permission to sign the Treaty of Amity and Commerce (United States–Japan) in 1858, Iwakura was among 88 courtiers who opposed the treaty and attempted to hinder negotiations between the court and the shogunate.

Kujō Hisatada, the Kampaku, or chief minister to the emperor, supported the shogunate's decision to sign the treaty. In order to prevent the signing, the 88 courtiers forced an audience with the Kampaku. The Kampaku acquiesced. This incident is called the demonstration of 88 retainers of the Imperial court. Following this incident, Iwakura published his opinion, expressing his concern that before any treaty could be signed, Japan needed to learn about the situation and customs of foreign countries. In 1858, Ii Naosuke took power over the shogunate as Tairō in a bid to squander the political aspirations of the Mito Tokugawa faction. He signed the Treaty of Amity and Commerce without asking Emperor Kōmei, angering the emperor, and souring relations between the shogunate and the court.

Ii Naosuke was assassinated in 1860. His rule had lasted only 20 months and served to alienate not only the imperial court, but a number of key figures whose cooperation was essential to maintaining the Tokugawa system of governance. His death necessitated rapprochement between the court and the shogunate, giving form to the Kōbu gattai movement. Following Ii's assassination, two Senior Councilors, Andō Nobumasa and Kuze Hirochika, came to power within the shogunate, determined to reach conciliation with the court. Conciliation was to be achieved through the marriage of the Shōgun Tokugawa Iemochi and Princess Kazu-no-Miya Chikako, the younger half sister of the Emperor Kōmei. The idea for this arrangement had originated with the Kanpaku, Kujō Hisatada in 1858 and was heavily negotiated until it was formally proposed to the imperial court by Kujō on 19 June 1860.

Emperor Kōmei was opposed to this request as Kazunomiya was already engaged to Prince Arisugawa Taruhito. However, engagement presents had not yet been exchanged, and, the shogunate argued, the court could easily request that the prince rescind his claim. Presented with this suggestion on 21 July 1860, the emperor called on Iwakura as a confidant and requested his opinion. Iwakura suggested that the emperor allow the marriage with the condition that the shogunate take steps to rescind all treaties with foreign powers, thereby recognizing the dominance of the court in diplomatic affairs.

Emperor Kōmei announced his sister's engagement to the shogun on 30 November. Having influenced the emperor's decision to go forward with the marriage, Iwakura was among the courtiers who traveled with the princess from Kyoto to Edo. On 22 December 1861, Iwakura met with Senior Councilors Andō Nobumasa and Kuze Hirochika. He delivered a letter from the emperor criticizing the shogun's hesitation in dealing with the foreign threat.

Iwakura's purpose in this meeting was twofold: Primarily, he was to push for action to be taken towards the eventual expulsion of the foreigners. He was also tasked with obtaining the rescission of punishments meted out against courtiers during Ii Naosuke's 1858-59 purge. To gain capitulation on both of these issues, Iwakura leveraged a third; the rumors of a coup against Emperor Kōmei. Ando and Kuze, among other high ranking officials of the new shogunate, were unknown entities outside of Edo, and were widely believed by imperial courtiers to be capable of the authoritarianism that characterized Ii Naosuke's governance. The shogunate officials on the other hand, did not find themselves capable of a coup, as evinced by their insistence on the union in the first place. Iwakura himself may or may not have found the rumors convincing. Regardless, when Ando and Kuze denied any conspiracy against the emperor, Iwakura pushed for a signed note from the shogun himself, corroborating their claim. Ando and Kuze would not acquiesce to this, but offered their cooperation on the issue of remitting the punishments of the courtiers.

Iwakura arrived back in Kyoto on 24 January 1862 and immediately entered mourning for his mother, whose death he learned of during his return journey. As such, he was unable to deliver the news of his victory directly to the emperor but was nevertheless, amply rewarded.

Those who supported the more radical Sonnō jōi movement to overthrow the Tokugawa shogunate and reinstate the power of the emperor saw Iwakura as a supporter of the Shogunate, and put pressure on the court to expel him. Emperor Kōmei insisted that Iwakura was innocent, but could not stop those who would threaten him, including Takechi Hanpeita. Iwakura was forced to resign from the imperial court and go into hiding.

== In exile ==
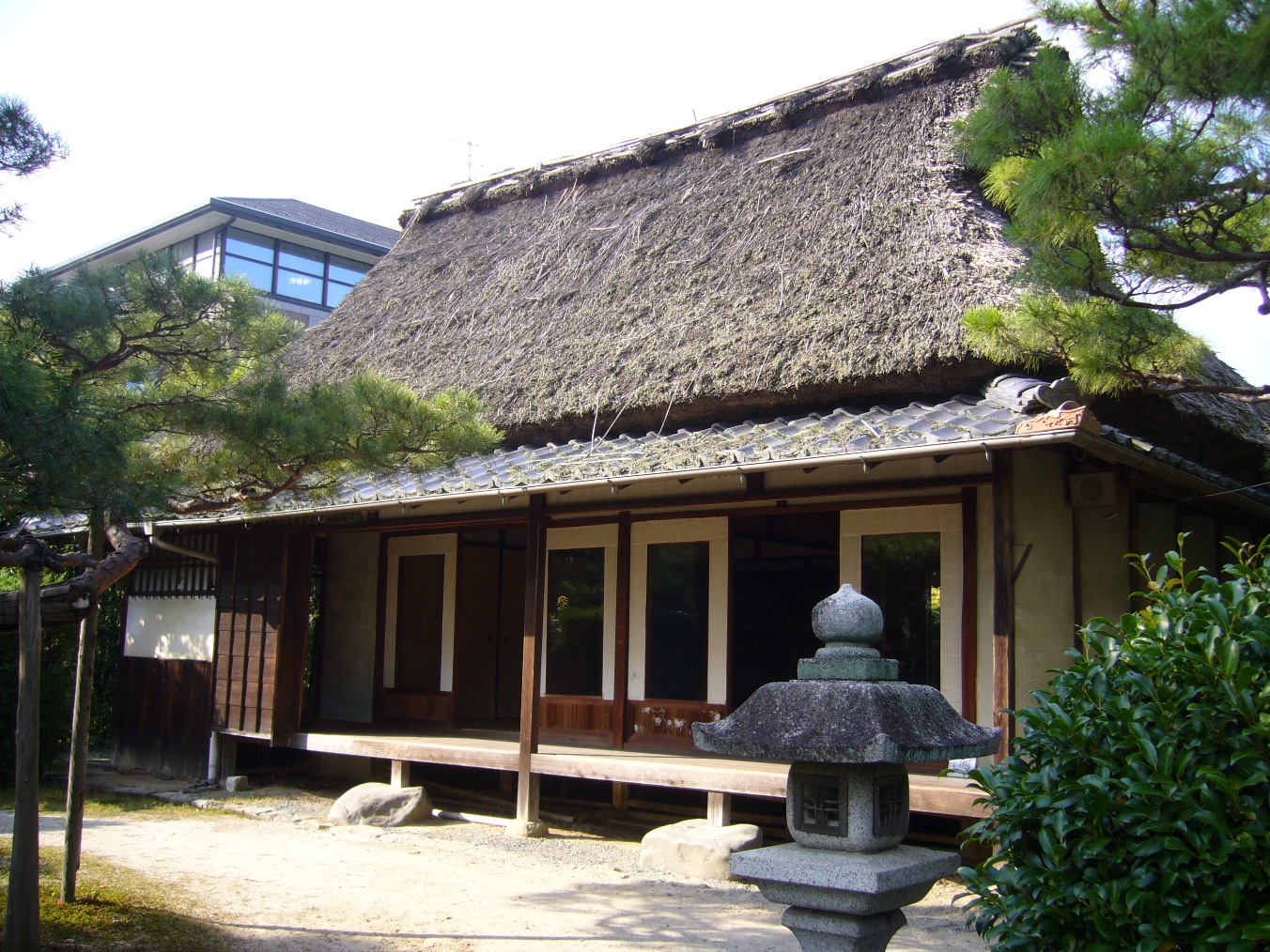
The Former Retreat of Tomomi Iwakura (岩倉具視幽棲旧跡) in Iwakura, Sakyo Ward, Kyoto City. It is open to the public for a fee. The building in the background is Iwakura Hospital.

Iwakura's exile lasted from 1862 to 1867. Initially, he left for the Nishigamo district’s Reigen Temple, before moving on to Saiho Temple. Ultimately, he borrowed the abandoned home of a man by the name of Fujiya Togoro in Northern Kyoto's Iwakura Village until 1867.

During his exile, Iwakura wrote many opinions and sent them to the Court or his political companions in Satsuma Domain. For example, in 1865, Iwakura showed 'Sōrimeichū'(叢裡鳴虫), a written opinion, to Ōkubo Toshimichi and Komatsu Tatewaki from Satsuma clans. He used this title to compare himself to an insect in the grasses. Moreover, he sent 'Zoku：Sōrimeichū'(続・叢裡鳴虫) to Ōkubo and Komatsu. He claimed the importance of national unity for external crises. He relied on Satsuma clans because he found that they were capable people. Also, people from Satsuma clans had connections with the imperial court, so Iwakura tried to get them to send his written opinions to the imperial court. Responses of Nijō Nariyuki, a Kanpaku, and Satsuma clans were subtle. Iwakura was away from politics because of the penalty, so there was a difference between the Iwakura's thoughts and the actual political situation. In 1866 when Shōgun Iemochi died, Iwakura attempted to have the Court seize political initiative. He tried to gather daimyō under the name of the Court but failed. When the Emperor Kōmei died the next year, there was a rumor Iwakura had plotted to murder the emperor with poison, but he escaped arrest. After the Kinmon incident, he returned to normal life, and his innocence was proved.

On 15 October 1867, the shogun, Tokugawa Yoshinobu returned his power to the imperial court. Yoshinobu worried about the external crisis and recognized the importance of national unity. In this situation, Ōkubo planned the coup that abolished the shogunate and sekkan systems. On December 8th, Iwakura participated in the kogosho meeting and talked about the disposal of Yoshinobu. During this meeting, Yamauchi Yōdō shouted, claiming that they should let Yoshinobu participate in this meeting and criticized a coup. It is a famous episode that Iwakura scolded Yamauchi because his attitude was rude, but this episode is a fiction. In fact, Iwakura could not easily convince Yamauchi, and their discussion was continued for the long term. Finally, Iwakura and Ōkubo convinced those who opposed the disposal of Yoshinobu.

With Ōkubo Toshimichi and Saigō Takamori, on 3 January 1868, he engineered the seizure of the Kyoto Imperial Palace by forces loyal to Satsuma and Chōshū, thus initiating the Meiji Restoration. He commissioned Imperial banners with the sun and moon on a red field, which helped ensure that the encounters of the Meiji Restoration were generally bloodless affairs.

== Meiji bureaucrat ==
Iwakura Mission. The head of the mission was Iwakura Tomomi, shown in the picture wearing traditional Japanese clothing of the samurai class including the distinctive hairstyle known as the chonmage.

After the establishment of the Meiji government, Iwakura played an important role due to the influence and trust he had with Emperor Meiji. He put forward the emperor's directly ruled government. After the establishment of the Meiji government, Iwakura played an important role due to the influence and trust he had with Emperor Meiji. He was largely responsible for the promulgation of the Five Charter Oath of 1868, the subject abolition of the han system and the establishment of Dajō-kan. Moreover, he planned to move the emperor from Kyoto to Tokyo to make a new political environment. Some court nobles in Kyoto criticized these reforms, but he promoted these restorations with Sanjō Sanetomi despite their opposition.

Soon after his appointment as Minister of the Right in 1871, he led the two-year around-the-world journey known as the Iwakura mission, visiting the United States and several countries in Europe with the purpose of renegotiating the unequal treaties and gathering information to help effect the modernization of Japan. American newspapers reported that a visit by Iwakura was as important as a visit by the Prime Minister of the United Kingdom. He failed when he discussed the revision of the unequal treaty with the U.S. president. The U.S. president pointed out that Iwakura did not have a commission of full powers. Ōkubo and Itō immediately returned to Japan on March 24 to get a commission of full powers and then returned to the United States on June 17. Despite their efforts, the United States was no longer interested in the revision of the unequal treaty at that time.

During his travels, Iwakura was surprised at the economic prosperity he observed in western countries. He was especially interested in the railways. Also, he learned the importance of religious problems in the United States and he thought that the prohibition of Christianity was an obstacle to change the unequal treaties. Besides, he felt the danger of rapid Westernization, because he saw and learned about the merits and demerits of Westernization. At first, this trip was planned for 10 months and a half, but it took a year and 10 months in the end. A celebration was held in Manchester and Liverpool in 1997 to celebrate the 125th anniversary of the Iwakura Mission.

Before the return of the Iwakura mission, the dispatch of Saigō to Korea was decided in a cabinet meeting. Generally, people thought that the dispatch of Saigō was too dangerous, but Saigō persisted in his decision. On his return to Japan in 1873, he was just in time to prevent an invasion of Korea (Seikanron). Iwakura opposed the dispatch because Japan also faced foreign issues concerning Karafuto and Taiwan. Also, Iwakura wanted to prevent the dispatch of Saigō to avoid foreign wars. Realizing that Japan was not in any position to challenge the western powers in its present state, he advocated strengthening the imperial institution, which he felt could be accomplished through a written constitution and a limited form of parliamentary democracy. Ōkubo supported Iwakura's idea. In the next meeting, Saigō was absent to imply his disposal in case his claim would not be accepted. Sanjō Sanetomi, a prime minister was surprised about it and suddenly changed his opinion from the opposition of dispatch to the acceptance of dispatch. A lot of members including Iwakura criticized the sudden mind change of Sanjō, and they requested their disposal. Sanjō panicked and he became unable to work because he wanted to avoid every member's disposal. Instead of Sanjō, Iwakura became the substitute of the prime minister and prevented the dispatch of Saigō. Due to this decision, some people had complaints, and Iwakura was attacked by nine people led by Takechi Kumakichi in Kuichigaizaka, Akasaka. He was slightly injured but severely damaged mentally. (Kuichigai Incident)

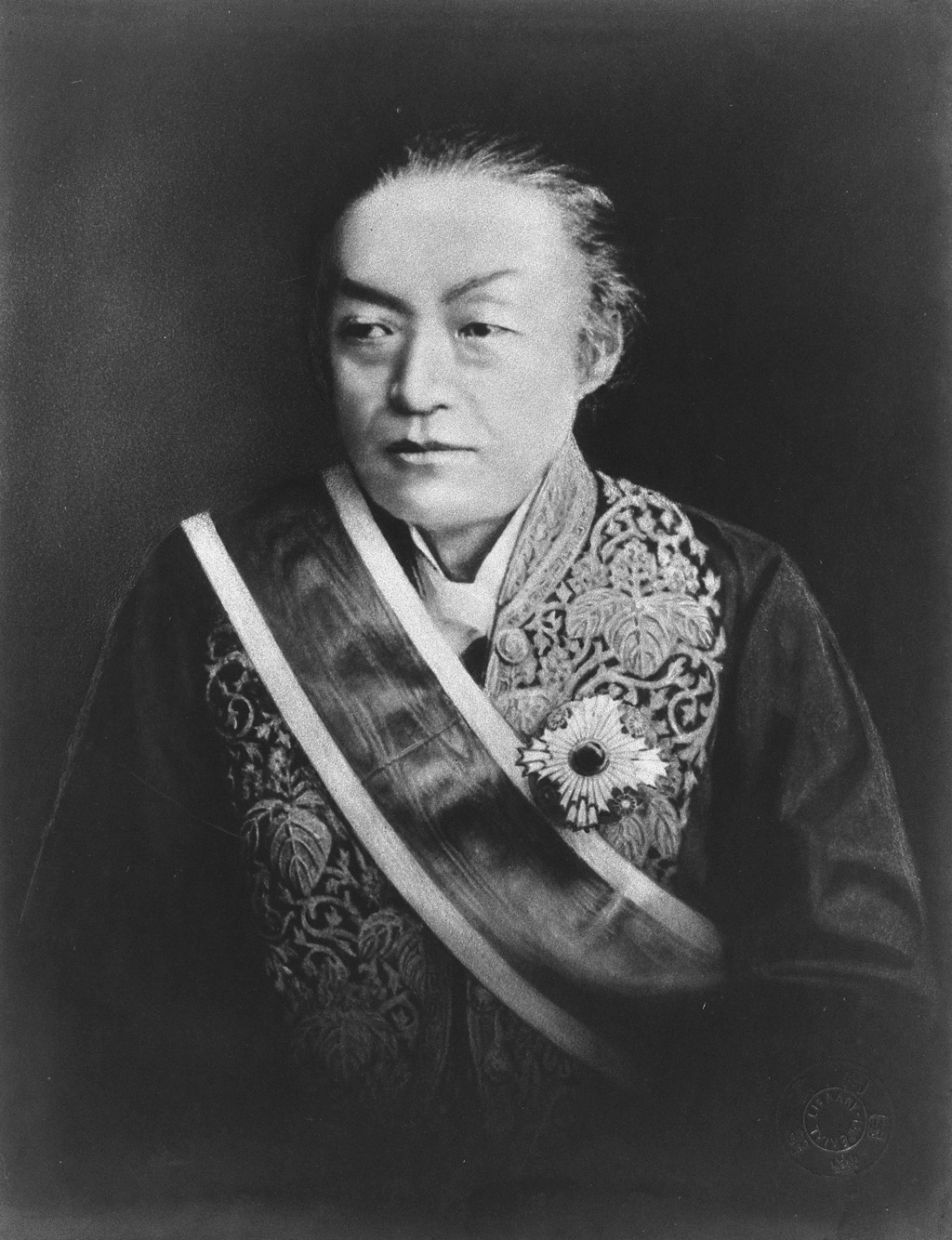
Iwakura c. 1880s

In 1873, Kido and Ōkubo raised written opinions about a constitution. Both opinions said that Japan should make a constitution as soon as possible, so to establishing a constitution became an urgent issue in Japan. In this situation, Ōkubo was assassinated in 1878, and Iwakura had to choose Itō Hirobumi or Ōkuma Shigenobu as a successor of Ōkubo. Itō wanted an absolute monarchy as in Germany while Ōkuma favored a constitutional monarchy as exemplified by the United Kingdom. Ultimately, Iwakura chose Itō and the German model as the basis for Japan's constitution.

On 19 April 1876, Iwakura became the director of the Peerage Hall. However, in the early Meiji period, it was not clear what exactly they were doing, and as a result they were more independent than they were later on, and conflicts often occurred, especially between those from feudal lords and those from court nobles. It was like that. However, the nobility that Iwakura had in mind was a European-style aristocracy whose mission was solely to support the imperial family. Therefore, it was necessary to make all Chinese people understand that petty conflicts based on the old framework were pointless.

However, from around 1880 (Meiji 13), the Freedom and People's Rights Movement gained momentum, and discussions on establishing a constitution accelerated. He ordered Inoue Kowashi to begin work on a constitution in late June 1881, and ordered Itō Hirobumi to Europe to study various European systems. In March 1882, Itō departed for Europe. Iwakura had high expectations for the investigation of Itō. On the other hand, during the dispatch of Itō, Iwakura worried that Itō might be really influenced by Germany. Although Iwakura accepted to make a constitution based on the Germany system, he wanted to make a constitution unique to Japan. Also, Iwakura wanted to cherish the Japanese tradition and emperor system. From such an idea, in 1882, He established an Internal regulation interrogation station to investigate imperial ceremonies and Japanese tradition, and offered the install of the National history compilation stations in 1883. This station aimed to translate Japanese history into American.

=== Restoration of Kyoto ===
In 1881, Iwakura established a society for the restoration of Kyoto following the transfer of Japan's capital to Tokyo. Undeterred by his declining health, in January of 1883, Iwakura issued a paper titled Kyoto Kögü hozon ni kanshi ikensho (京都 厚遇 保存 に 関し 意見書) or, "On preserving the Kyoto palace," in which he constructed a plan for the rehabilitation of Kyoto as an ancient capital differentiated from Nara. He argued for future imperial enthronements to be hosted in Kyoto, as well as for the revival of the Kyoto Kamo festival.

== Death and Legacy ==
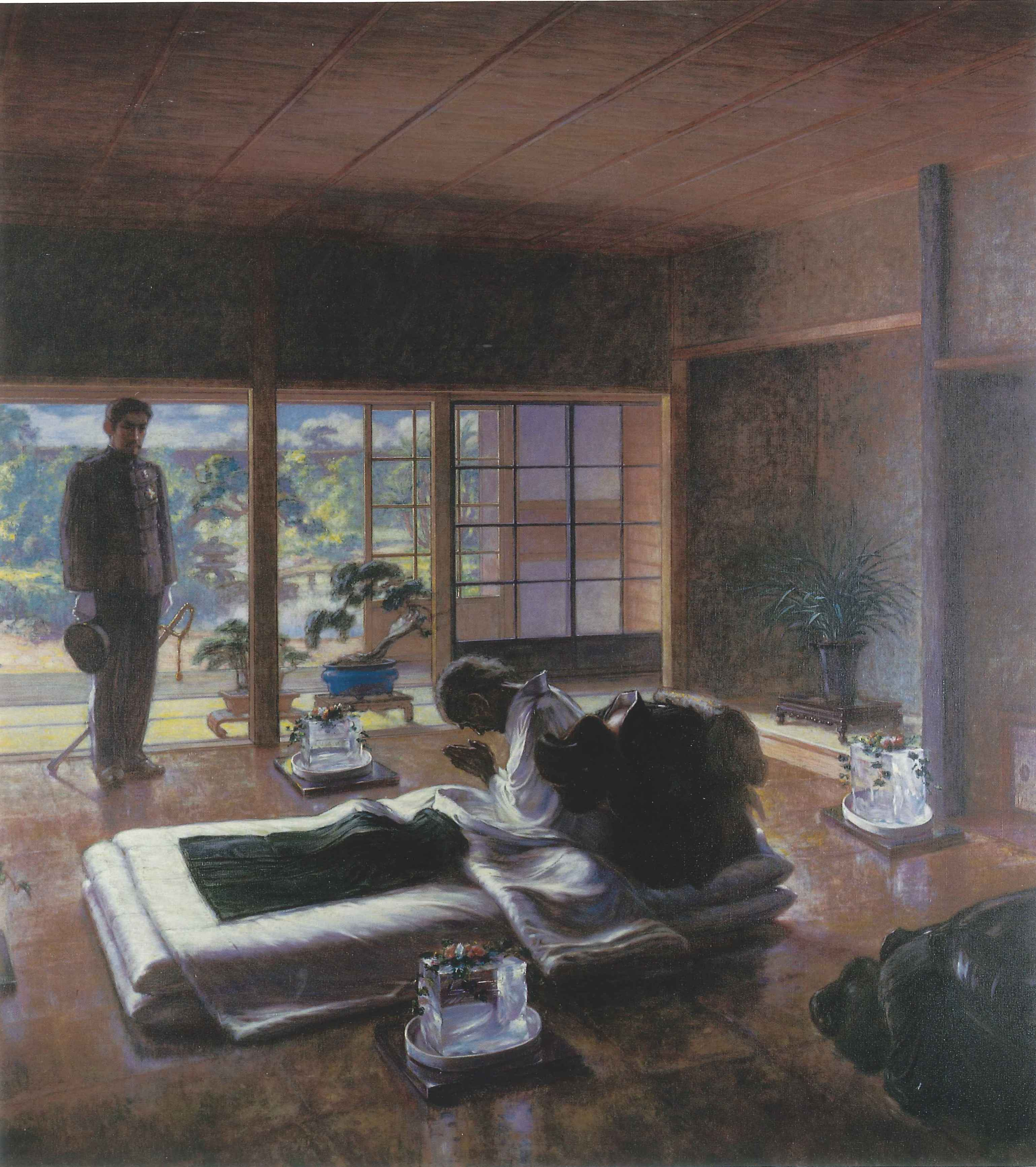
Emperor Meiji visiting a sick Iwakura by Kita Renzō

Iwakura was unable to witness Itō Hirobumi's return to Japan or the enactment of the Constitution of the Empire of Japan.

On 12 June 1883, Iwakura experienced sudden chest pain and could no longer eat. Advanced esophageal cancer had narrowed his airway to the point that food could not pass through. The Meiji Emperor sent his personal physician, Erwin Bälz, to examine Iwakura. The doctor remained by Iwakura's side, recording the progress of his cancer.

Together, Balz and Iwakura boarded a ship from Kyoto to Tokyo. During the journey, Iwakura, understanding the hopelessness of his situation, requested that the doctor keep him alive long enough for Ito Hirobumi to return from Berlin with a new constitution for Japan. Iwakura wished to communicate his will to Ito in person. Unfortunately, he soon became completely unable to eat and was consequently wasting away.

The emperor personally visited his cousin and old friend on July 19, and was moved to tears at his condition.

Iwakura died the following day at the age of 57. Unable to wait any longer for Ito's return, Iwakura asked for statesman Inoue Kowashi, to whom he confided instead. Bälz and Inoue were with Iwakura until the end of his life. He was given a state funeral, the first ever given by the imperial government, and was buried in Asamadai, Minami-Shinagawa.

A poem by Iwakura was included in the 1942 Aikoku Hyakunin Isshu.

If the American ships come, the spirit of Mt. Mikasa will be there
ふるばかり亞米利加船の寄せば寄せ三笠の山の神いますなり

== Personal life ==
Iwakura Tomomi's height was about 160cm. He used to like Japanese sake and drank around 90 ml, three times a day. However, because of his health condition and food restrictions, he could drink western wine only instead of Japanese sake. During his life after retirement, he did not exercise at all, and ate very little to the extent he was compared to a bird. Iwakura was very particular about what to eat, and was fond of eating fish, meat, and vegetables, rather than beef and chicken. He also liked the cuisine of Kyoto, and turtle cuisine was one of his favorites.

Iwakura was a lifelong patron of Noh theater. In 1876, he organized the first tenran-no (a performance in the presence of the emperor) of the Meiji era at his private residence. Iwakura's daughter-in-law, Iwakura Chisako (1861 - 1922), was among the first female amateur practitioners of Noh as the artform gained popularity in Tokyo at the end of the century.

He had a wife, named Mineko, but she died on 24 October 1874. After Mineko's death, he remarried Makiko Noguchi. He is an ancestor to actor Ken Uehara, singer Yūzō Kayama, and actress Emi Ikehata.

== Honours ==
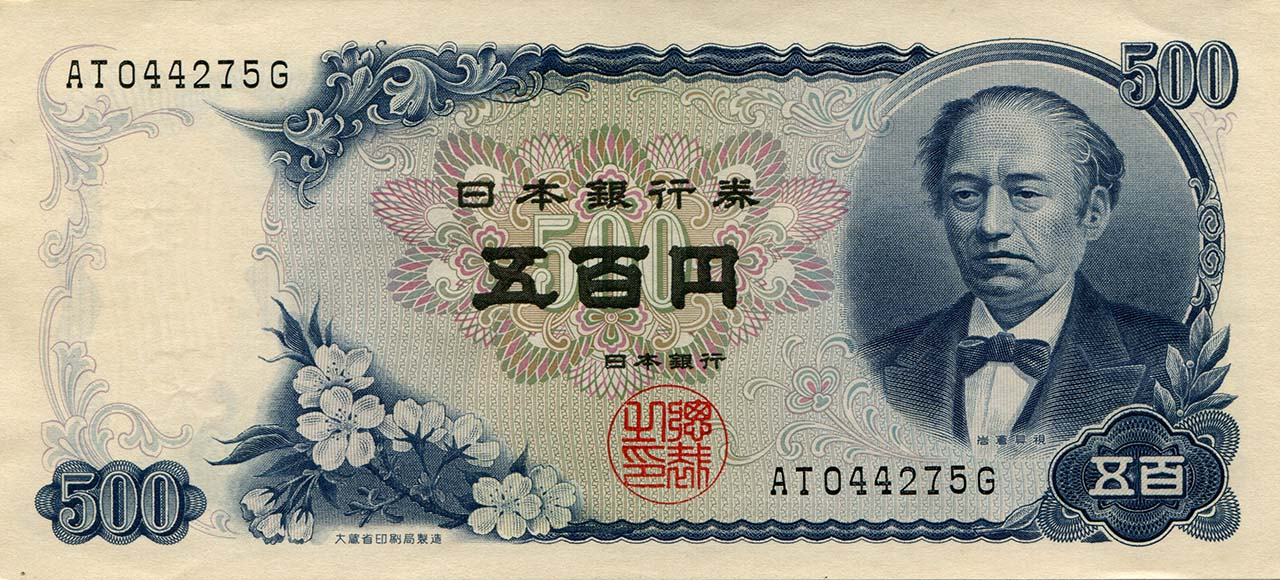
On the old 500 yen note

From the corresponding article in the Japanese Wikipedia

=== Decorations ===
- Grand Cordon of the Order of the Rising Sun (29 December 1876)
- Grand Cordon of the Order of the Chrysanthemum (1 November 1882)

=== Order of precedence ===
- Junior fifth rank (28th day, 10th month of the ninth year of Tenpo (1838))
- Fifth rank (Fourth day, sixth month of the 12th year of Tenpo (1841))
- Senior fifth rank (18th day, second month of the second year of Koka (1845))
- Fourth rank (10th day, sixth month of the seventh year of Ansei (1854))
- Senior fourth rank (Fifth day, first month of the second year of Man'en (1861))
- Third rank (Second day, second month of the fourth year of Keio (1868))
- Senior second rank (25th day, first month of the second year of Meiji (1869))
- First rank (18 May 1876)
- Senior first rank (20 July 1885; posthumous)

== Ancestry ==
Ancestors of Iwakura Tomomi

8. Hagiwara Kazurei (1718–1784)
4. Hagiwara Kazumiki (1740–1828)
9. Kurahashi
2. Horikawa Yasuchika (1797–1859)
1. Iwakura Tomomi (1825–1883)
12. Kanshūji Akimichi (1717–1756)
6. Kanshūji Tsunehaya (1748–1805)
13. Inaba
3. Kanshūji Yoshiko (1799–1861)
