= Banknotes of the Anglo-Egyptian Banking Company Limited (Malta) =

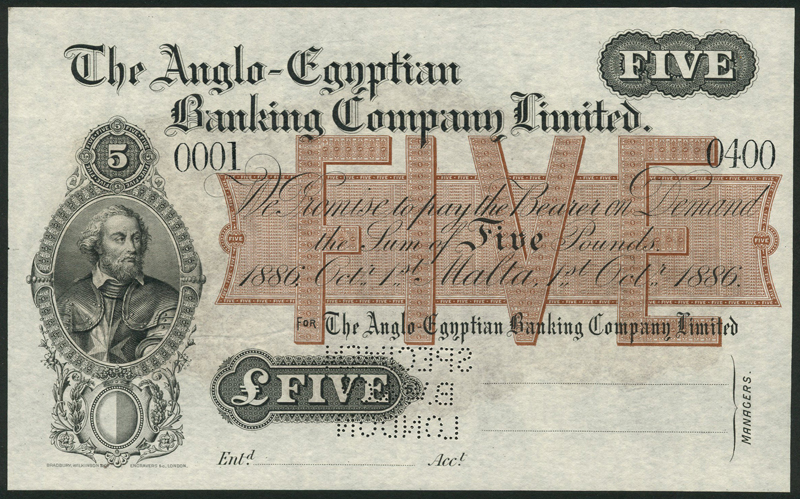
A specimen £5 banknote.

An issue of extremely rare banknotes were issued in 1886 by the Anglo-Egyptian Banking Company Limited for circulation in Malta. The notes all bear the date 1 October 1886. The notes were signed by the Bank's two Managers and the Bank's Accountant. All of them portray Grandmaster Jean Parisot de Valette. The currency that these notes are expressed in is sterling.

== Catalogue ==
- PS101. 10 shillings. 1 October 1886. Black on pink paper.
- PS102. 1 pound 1 October 1886. Black on pink paper.
- PS103. 5 pounds. 1 October 1886. Black on pink paper.
- PS104. 10 pounds. 1 October 1886. Black on pink paper.
- PS105. 20 pounds. 1 October 1886. Black on pink paper.
