= Abdel-Moneim Mustafa =

Sudanese architect and lecturer

- عبدالمنعم مصطفى
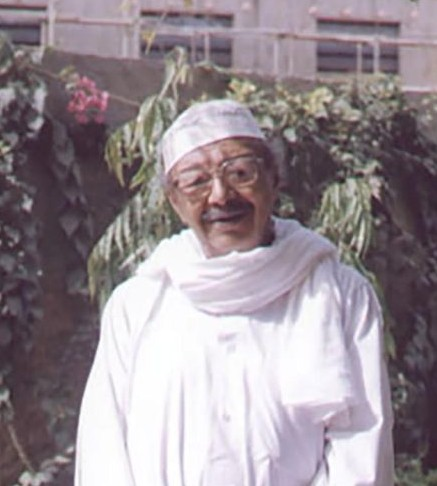
- Abdel-Moneim Mustafa in 1981
- Born: 1930 (age 95–96); Omdurman, Anglo-Egypt Sudan
- Education: University of Khartoum; University of Leicester
- Occupation: Architect

Abdel-Moneim Mustafa (Arabic: عبدالمنعم مصطفى; born 1930, Omdurman) is a Sudanese architect and lecturer. In a career that spanned more than 60 years, Mustafa produced a number of landmark buildings in Sudan. He is considered one of the pioneers of Modernist architecture in Sudan, as well as one of its "most admired architects."

== Early life and education ==
Abdel-Moneim Mustafa was born in 1930 in Omdurman, Anglo-Egypt Sudan. Mustafa first studied engineering at the University of Khartoum, which did not yet have an architecture department. During that time he received a fellowship to study architecture at the University of Leicester in the UK, where he graduated in 1958. He obtained a Master's degree from Australia in the mid 1960s, and then a higher diploma from the Netherlands.

In 1964, Mustafa joined the Department of Architecture at the University of Khartoum, and was the first Sudanese lecturer there after Sudan's independence in 1956. He later became department head between 1972 — 74. During that time Mustafa published a number of scientific papers that discussed various topics such as the type of housing units in Sudan, analysis of real estate trusts and finally he discussed the effect of transportation on the cost of building materials and construction.

== Architectural practice and legacy ==
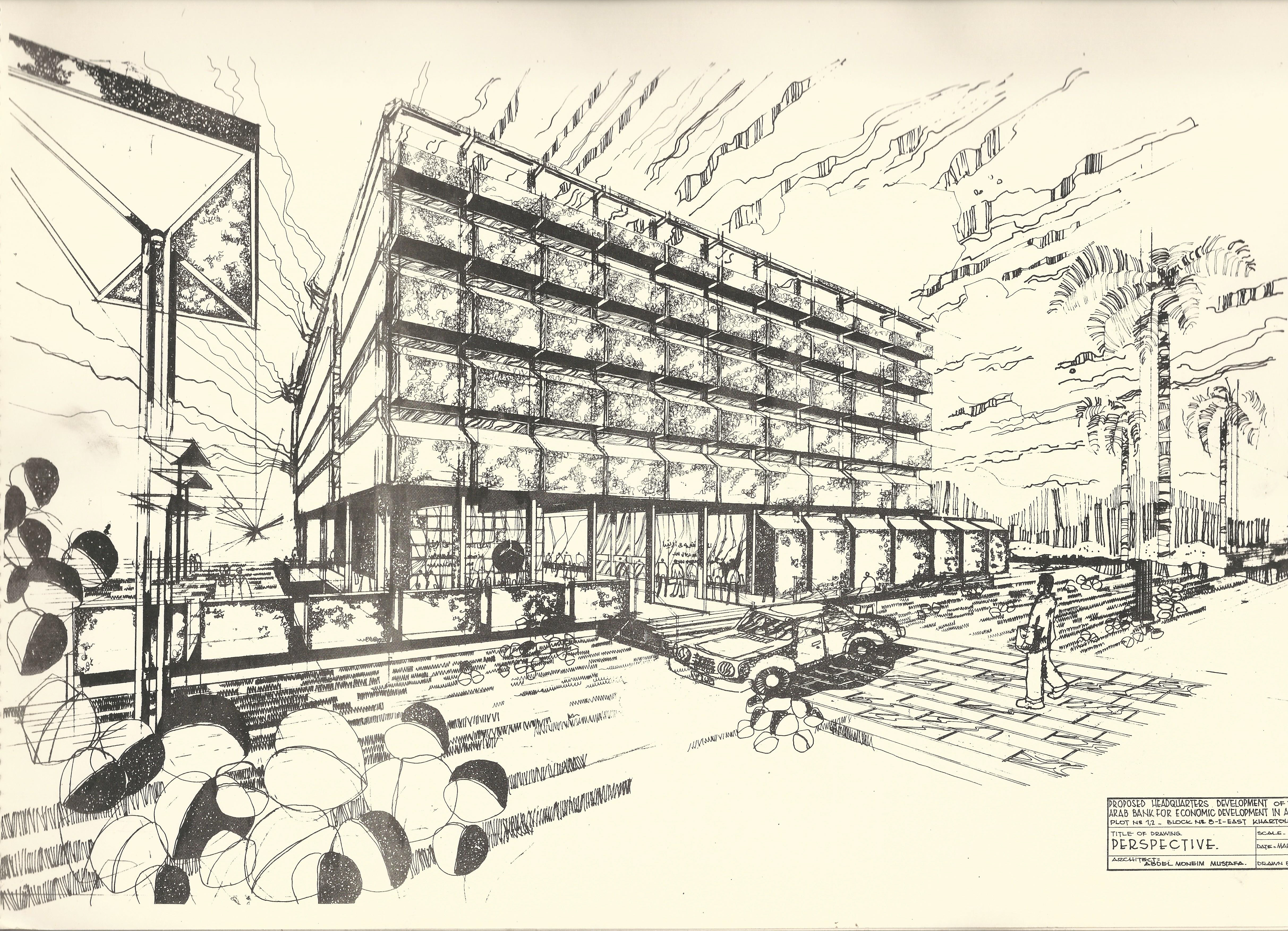
Arab Bank for Economic Development in Africa designed by Abdel-Moneim Mustafa

Mustafa joined the Ministry of Public Works in 1963, and at the same time established his private practice, Technocon. He designed a range of building types including administrative, educational, industrial, recreational and residential buildings. He collaborated with a number of architects, including Australian academic Peter Muller.

Mustafa is considered one of the pioneers of Modernist architecture in his country, as well as one of its "most admired architects." His style was noted for reflecting the architecture of Africa. His creativity and radical thinking can be considered as the main reasons for the architectural development Sudan witnessed in the 1960s and continue to experience till today.

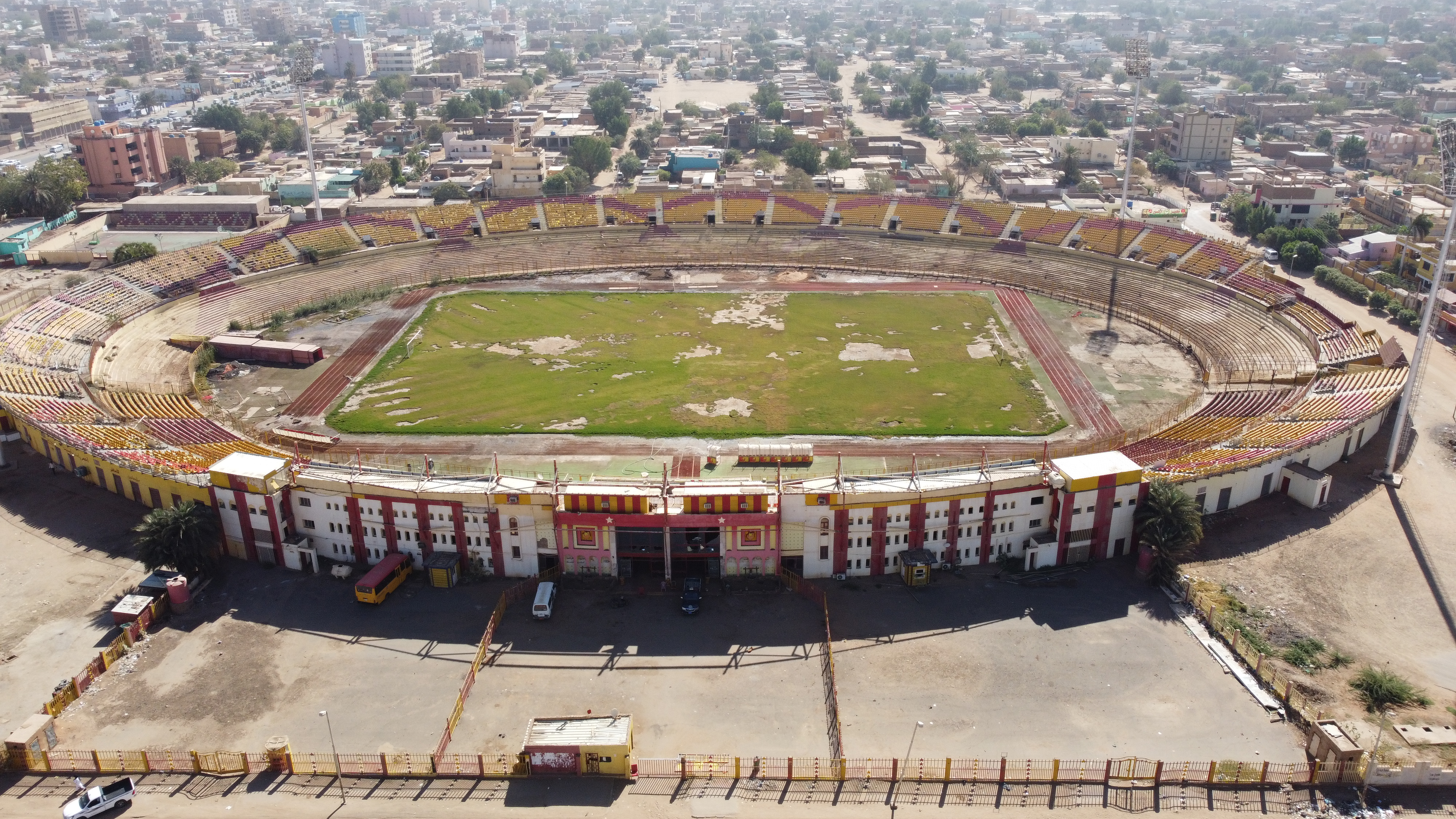
Al-Merrikh Stadium designed by Abdel-Moneim Mustafa

=== Main work ===
- Khartoum Villa, Khartoum.
- Al-Merrikh Stadium
- Nifidi and Malik Mixed Use Developments, Khartoum.
- University of Khartoum, Department of Biochemistry and Structures Laboratory, Khartoum, 1967.
- El Turabi School, Blue Nile Province, 1967.
- El Ikhwa Building, Khartoum, 1970.
- Bank of Khartoum Headquarters Khartoum
- Arab Bank for Economic Development in Africa (BADEA) Headquarters, Khartoum, 1980.
- Mansoor Khalid's House in Khartoum
