= Bank of Khartoum =

Sudanese bank

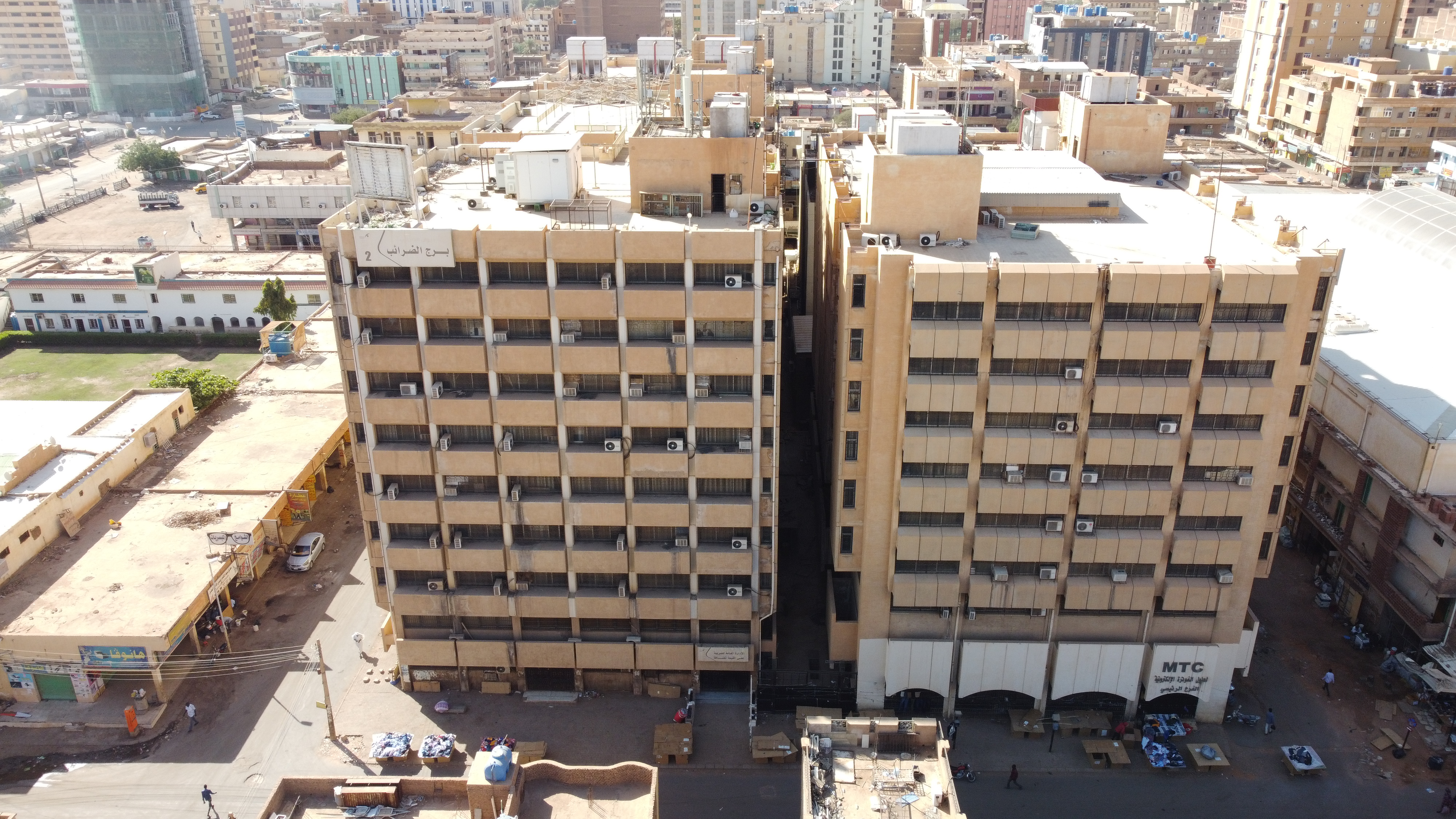
- Bank of Khartoum Headquarters in 1987 designed by Abdel-Moneim Mustafa
- Type: Public bank
- Industry: Banking
- Headquarters: Khartoum, Sudan
- Number of locations: 140 (2023)
- Key people: Mohamed Saeed Ahmed Abdalla Alshareef (Chairman); Limia Kamal Satti Salih (CEO)
- Total assets: SDG 3,01 trillion (2023) (USD 2,3 billion)
- Total equity: SDG 423 billion (2023) (USD 322 million)
- Number of employees: 2700 (2023)
- Website: bankofkhartoum.com

Bank of Khartoum (BOK), is the largest bank in Sudan. With some 111 or more branches, it is also the commercial bank with the oldest continuous history in the country. The largest single shareholder is Dubai Islamic Bank. In 2011, the government of the United States of America lifted its sanctions on Bank of Khartoum. The US Treasury’s Office of Foreign Assets Control posted a notice on its website that it had removed Bank of Khartoum from the blacklist, meaning Bank of Khartoum could seek the return of blocked assets and resume limited dealings with U.S. financial institutions. However, in March 2014, several European and Saudi Arabian banks announced that they would cease transacting with Bank of Sudan.

With the separation of South Sudan from Sudan, the Bank of Khartoum Juba (BOK-JUBA) is now operating as a commercial bank in South Sudan. In 2012, the Government of South Sudan forced the sale of the shares and the BOK-JUBA bank became Charter One Bank (South Sudan)

== History ==
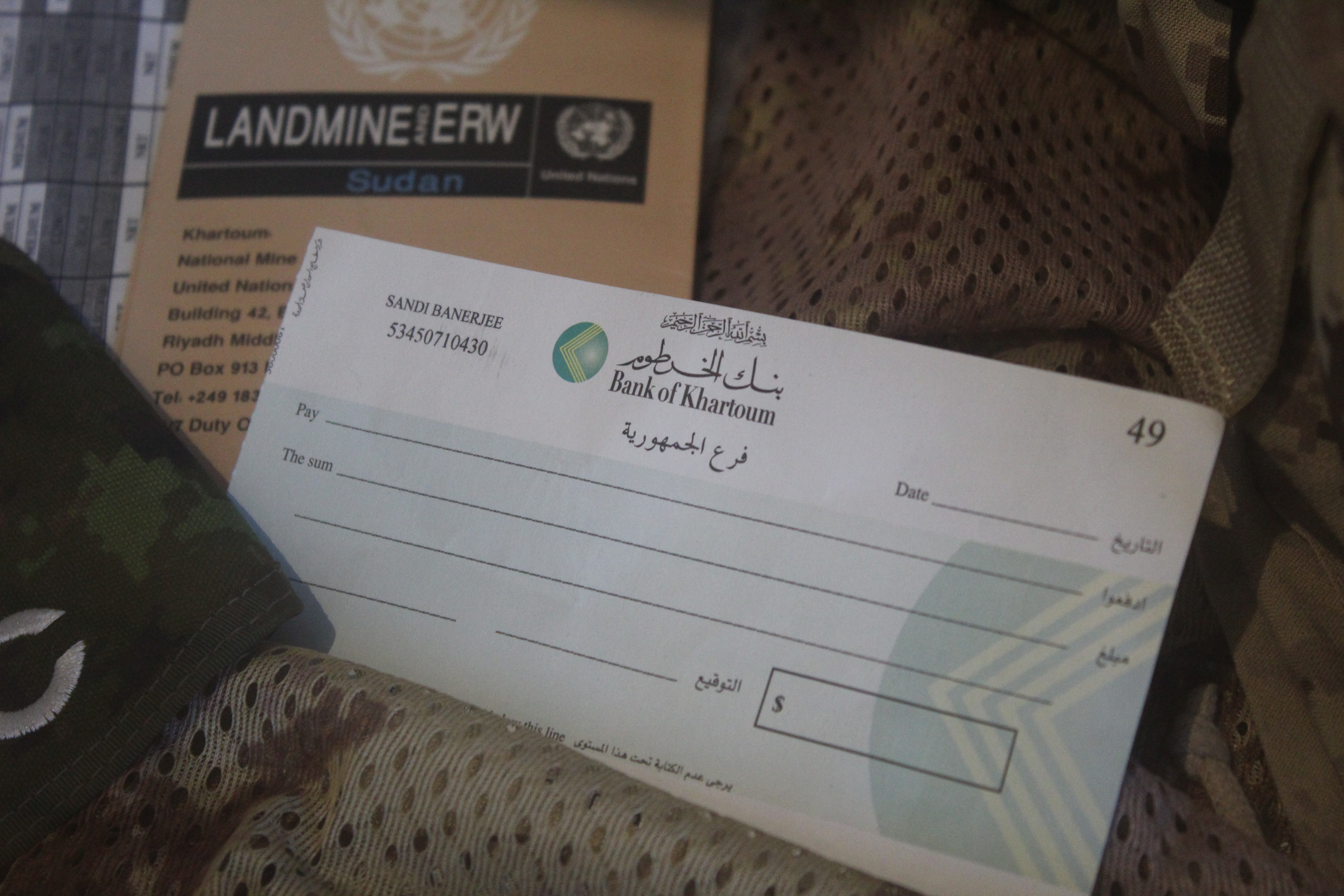
Cheque issued by the bank in 2020

The origins of the Bank of Khartoum date back to 1913 when the Anglo-Egyptian Bank established a branch in Khartoum. In 1925, Barclays Bank merged Anglo-Egyptian with two other banks to form Barclays Bank (Dominion, Colonial and Overseas).

After World War II, Ottoman Bank in 1948 established a branch in Khartoum. Five years later, Egypt's Bank Misr too established a branch in Khartoum, followed the next year by Jordan's Arab Bank. Then in 1958 the State Bank of Ethiopia (later Commercial Bank of Ethiopia), established a branch in Khartoum.

In 1969, National and Grindlays Bank acquired Ottoman Bank, only to lose it the next year to nationalization. In 1970, the Sudanese government nationalized all the banks in the Sudan, changed the names of several, and put them under the Bank of Sudan. Barclays Bank, which had an extensive network of 24 branches, became the State Bank of Foreign Trade, and then Bank of Khartoum in 1975. Bank Misr's six branches became People's Cooperative Bank. Arab Bank's four branches became Red Sea Bank or Red Sea Commercial Bank (reports differ). Commercial Bank of Ethiopia's one branch became Juba Commercial Bank. National and Grindlays Bank's four branches, which Ottoman Bank had established, became Omdurman Bank. Then in 1973 the government merged Red Sea Bank and People's Cooperative Bank into Omdurman Bank.

Eleven years later, Omdurman Bank merged with Juba Commercial Bank to form Unity Bank. In 1993, the government grouped Unity Bank, National Export Import Bank, and Bank of Khartoum into the Khartoum Bank Group.

In 2002, the government prepared the Bank of Khartoum for privatization. The government then sold a 60 percent share to Dubai Islamic Bank in 2005. The next year, Islamic Development Bank, Dubai Islamic Bank, Sharjah Islamic Bank and Abu Dhabi Islamic Bank founded Emirates and Sudan Bank in Khartoum as a fully Islamic bank. The year after, Bank of Khartoum announced that it was merging with Emirates and Sudan Bank. The merger took effect in 2008.

Dubai Islamic's ownership will drop to 28 percent of the merged bank. The Sudanese government will own 10 percent of the bank, while Abu Dhabi Islamic Bank and Sharjah Islamic Bank would also own stakes.

== Sources ==
- Kaikati, Jack G. 1980. The Economy of Sudan: A Potential Breadbasket of the Arab World? International Journal of Middle East Studies 11, 99-123.
