= Al-Merrikh Stadium =

Multi-use stadium in Omdurman, Sudan

Coordinates: 15°38′29″N 32°28′18″E

- Red Castle
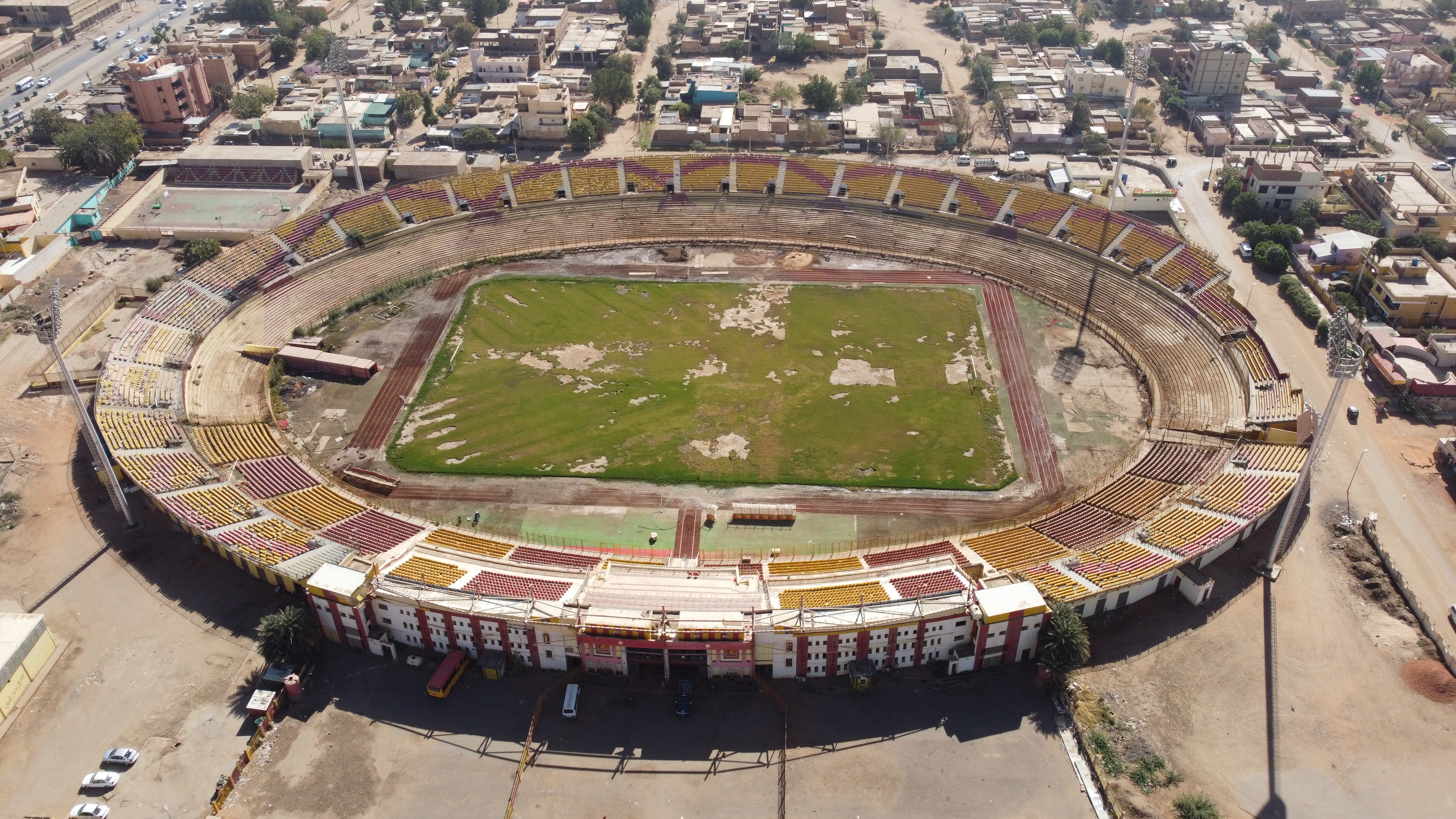
- Interactive map of Al-Merrikh Stadium
- Location: Omdurman, Sudan
- Capacity: 43,000 (to be expanded to 66,215)

Construction
- Groundbreaking: 1962
- Opened: November 30, 1964
- Renovated: 2003
- Cost: 42 Million Dollars
- Architect: Abdel-Moniem Mustafa

Tenant
- Al-Merreikh

Al-Merrikh Stadium, also known as the Red Castle, is a multi-use stadium in Omdurman, Sudan, used mostly for football matches and also sometimes for athletics. Established in 1962. The stadium is used mostly for football games and is considered the home stadium of both Al-Merrikh SC and the Sudan national team. Currently, the stadium has a capacity of 43,000. In the 2018 CAF Champions League season, Al-Merrikh drew an average home attendance of 37,250. They usually draw much lower crowds for their domestic league games.

== Overview ==
The stadium officially opened on November 30, 1964. It had first opened in 1962 while still under construction to host a meeting between Al-Hilal Club and Al-Mourada SC for a national holiday in November 1962. It closed its doors after the festivities and was officially inaugurated two years later, on November 30, 1964, with a match between Al-Merrikh and Dynamo Moscow. In 2003, the Board of Al-Merrikh, chaired by Jamal Al-Wali, undertook the renovation of the stadium to build a new gallery and include new seats. The cost of its new renovations was estimated at 42 million dollars. The stadium is currently closed for reconstruction that will expand it to approximately 66,215 capacity.

Al-Merrikh Stadium is located on Al-Baladya Street, Al-Arda (Arabic:العرضة) in the city of Omdurman, Sudan.

The stadium was the neutral site of the World Cup qualifier between Algeria and Egypt on November 18, 2009, which Algeria won 1–0 to qualify for the 2010 FIFA World Cup.
