= Proof banknote =

Test print of a banknote before full production

A proof banknote is one that is printed to test the printing plates to see if it is suitable or not for putting into full production.

A reason a proof banknote may be rejected is the colour is not suitable for one reason or other reasons.

Another reason a proof banknote may be rejected is due to the design itself being unsuitable for one reason or other reasons.

== See also ==
- Specimen banknote
