= 500 won coin =

South Korean coin

500 won
- South Korea
- Value: 500 South Korean won
- Mass: 7.70 g
- Diameter: 26.5 mm
- Thickness: 2.00 mm
- Edge: 120 reeds
- Composition: Cupronickel; 75% Cu; 25% Ni
- Years of minting: 1982–present

Obverse
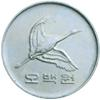
- Design: Red-crowned crane, value (hangul)
- Design date: 1982

Reverse
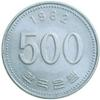
- Design: Value (digit), bank title, year of minting
- Design date: 1982

The 500 won coin (Korean: 오백원 동전; Hanja: 五百圓 銅錢; RR: Obaegwon dongjeon; MR: Obaegwŏn tongjŏn) is one of the South Korean won coins issued by the Bank of Korea, the central bank of South Korea.

== Design ==
On the obverse is a Red-crowned crane, one of the migratory birds that lives in South Korea, and the inscription "오백원" (Obaegwon), which means 500 won. On the reverse is the Arabic number "500", which means 500 won, the year of manufacture, and the "한국은행" (Hanguk Eunhaeng), which means the Bank of Korea. The Composition of the coin is Cupronickel (75% copper, 25% nickel), weighs 7.70g, has a diameter of 26.50mm and a thickness of 2.00mm, with 120 reeds carved on the edge. The red-crowned crane drawn on the coin looks like it is flying, which means "second economic leap" and "South Korea leap in the international community".

== History ==
On 8 January 1981, the Korean government first authorised the issue of the 500 won coin. On January 21, 1982, the Bank of Korea approved a plan to issue 500 won coins to replace the existing 500 won banknotes, and on June 12, 1982, 500 won coins were first issued. On January 15, 1983, the Bank of Korea issued a 1 won coin, 5 won coin, 10 won coin, 50 won coin and 100 won coin that modified the design form to match the 500 won coin.

The Bank of Korea originally planned to issue about 56,000,000 500 won coins in 1998, but canceled them after a campaign to collect coins took place in various regions of South Korea due to the influence of South Korea's request for an IMF bailout on December 3, 1997. Instead, the Bank of Korea has collected large amounts of 500 won coins from various regions of South Korea, while producing only about 8,000 500 won coins for gift sets. For this reason, only about 1,000 of the 500 won coins issued in 1998 are estimated to be circulating on the market, and due to their high scarcity, they are traded at hundreds of thousands of won per coin.

== Counterfeiting issues ==
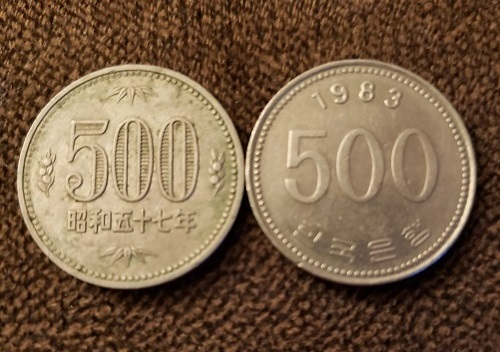
500 won coin (right), next to a Japanese 500 yen coin (left).

Until 2000, the Japanese 500 yen coin was identical to the South Korean 500 won coin in shape, size and material, but was lighter in weight. Defrauders would shave or drill holes in the surface of the Korean coins to match their weights with the Japanese coins then in production, use many of the methods of putting the counterfeit coins into vending machines installed in various regions of Japan, and press the return lever to exchange them for 500 yen coins. Due to these incidents, various regions of Japan have banned the use of 500 yen coins in vending machines for sometime.

In 1999, the Japanese government decided to stop issuing cupronickel 500 yen coins and switched to nickel-brass (72% copper, 20% zinc, 8% nickel) the following year. The new coins retained the same shape and size as the older coins, but weighed 7 grams.
