= Specimen banknote =

Example of a banknote design

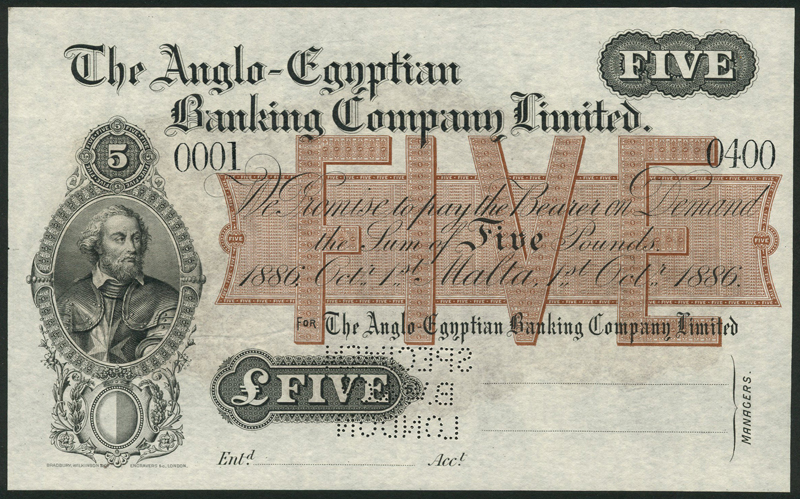
A specimen banknote of the Anglo-Egyptian Bank in Malta.

A specimen banknote is printed generally in very limited quantities for distribution to central banks to aid in the recognition of banknotes from a country other than their own. In some cases, specimen banknotes are printed in less limited quantities distributed to commercial banks, or even to commercial enterprises and the public at large in order to familiarize users about new designs. In addition, specimen banknotes are sold in some countries to collectors (often in special commemorative folders or albums). They have also been distributed by banknote printers (such as the American Bank Note Company) as examples of their craftsmanship. In Australia, the Reserve Bank used specimen notes as reference material for banks, commercial agencies and libraries, and distributed presentation albums to dignitaries, banks and other institutions.

Belarusian 1-ruble specimen (1992 design), with a red “ОБРАЗЕЦ” (“specimen”) overprint and the number “АА 0000000”.

To avoid use of specimen banknotes as legal tender notes, the banknotes are deformed, typically by being overprinted and/or punched (perfin) with an inscription such as "SPECIMEN", "SPECIMEN NO VALUE", "CANCELLED" or the equivalent in one or more other languages. In most cases, specimen notes have readily-identifiable serial numbers such as "99999999999" or "00000000000" or "1234567890". Many specimens have an additional "control number" that is used by a central bank to track who received a particular specimen.

Specimen banknotes vary in scarcity; in the case of the United States and many other countries, specimen banknotes remain the property of the central bank and when shared with another entity, are supposed to be kept secure and returned on demand. Such specimen banknotes may make it to collector markets without authorization. In other cases, specimen banknotes are very widely distributed, and since they have no circulating value, are worth less than circulating notes.

== Related types of banknotes ==
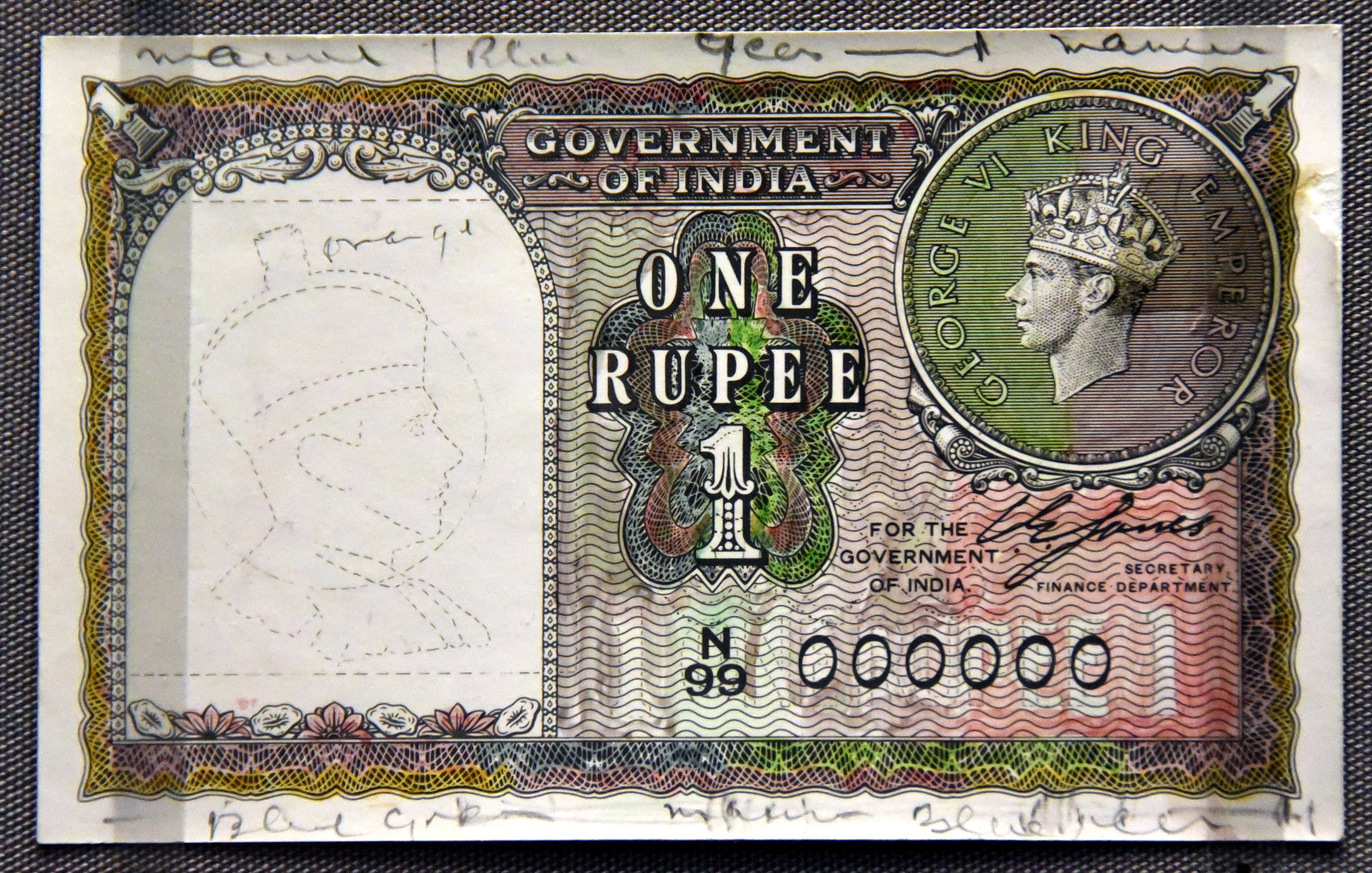
Trial design for a 1 rupee banknote. Government of India, 1940. On display at the British Museum in London

Variants of specimen notes, as well as other non-legal-tender images of banknotes include:

- An essay banknote is a potential design of a new banknote. Very often an essay has no serial numbers.
- A proof banknote is printed as a way of checking to see whether or not the design is suitable for putting into full production as a currency issue, as well as part of the process of testing various stages of the printing process of a banknote that has. Proof banknotes may be partial proofs of the obverse or reverse only ("uniface proofs"), or of only pieces of the design, such as the portrait.
- A plate proof banknote is a proof banknote of a multi-color banknote where there are separate plates used for printing separate colors.
- A trial color proof is printed typically in a variety of different colors or shades, either for testing or as part of the testing process.
- A test note generally has no identifiable denomination or has a fictitious currency and is used by independent printers or Government printers to showcase their printing technology or anti-counterfeiting measures, or as souvenirs at various industry tradeshows or collector events and expositions. Some test notes, generally much cruder, are issued by manufacturers of Automated Teller Machines, cash registers, banknote authenticating or counting machines for purposes of testing.
- A practice note is generally similar in size, shape and color to circulating banknotes and are used for training bank tellers, cashiers and staff at currency exchanges. They are generally unofficial and crudely printed, but are occasionally issued by central banks or printers when a new form of paper money is introduced (for example when the Euro notes replaced national currency in many European countries). Practice notes have also been created officially by the central banks when a new form of currency has been introduced, for example when Australia and New Zealand introduced decimal currency, replacing the Pound and pence with Dollars and cents.
- Educational notes or School Currency was issued by some schools to teach students to handle money.
- Play money may resemble real banknotes or be entirely fictitious and would typically be used by children for play, or as promotions or political or commercial advertising, often with additional messages overprinted or printed on one side.
- Hell banknotes resemble real banknotes or are fictitious, but are burned or buried, typically within Asian communities.
- Replica banknotes are copies, often easily identifiable, of historical or scarce banknotes. Sold as souvenirs at museums (e.g. Confederate currency) or as "space fillers" for collectors.
- Stage currency, Movie money or Motion Picture Prop Money is printed to resemble current or historical banknotes, but used on stage in theatrical productions or movies.
- Propaganda banknotes are issued by political factions, or enemies at war. They may be used for psychological warfare, or provide instructions about how to surrender (a "Safe Conduct Pass" has been dropped from aircraft over Vietnam, Iraq, Bosnia, etc. by US or NATO forces with a reproduction of a banknote on one side).
- Counterfeit banknotes include "contemporary circulating counterfeits" circulating fraudulently, counterfeit money issued by foreign governments as part of a destabilization campaign (e.g. the Nazi Operation Bernhard, or British counterfeits of Ottoman currency), as well as counterfeits of scarce variants of banknotes issued to defraud collectors.

== See also ==
- Pattern coin
- Specimen stamp
