= 10,000 yen note =

Highest circulating denomination of Japanese yen

¥10,000
- Country: Japan
- Value: 10,000 yen
- Width: 160 mm
- Height: 76 mm
- Security features: Holographic foil, intaglio printing, latent image, luminescent ink, microprinting, pearl ink, tactile marks, watermark, watermark-bar pattern, EURion constellation
- Years of printing: 1958–1984: Series C; 1984–1993: Series D, black serial number; 1993–2004: Series D, brown serial number; 2004–2011: Series E, black serial number; 2011–2024: Series E, brown serial number; 2024–present: Series F

Obverse
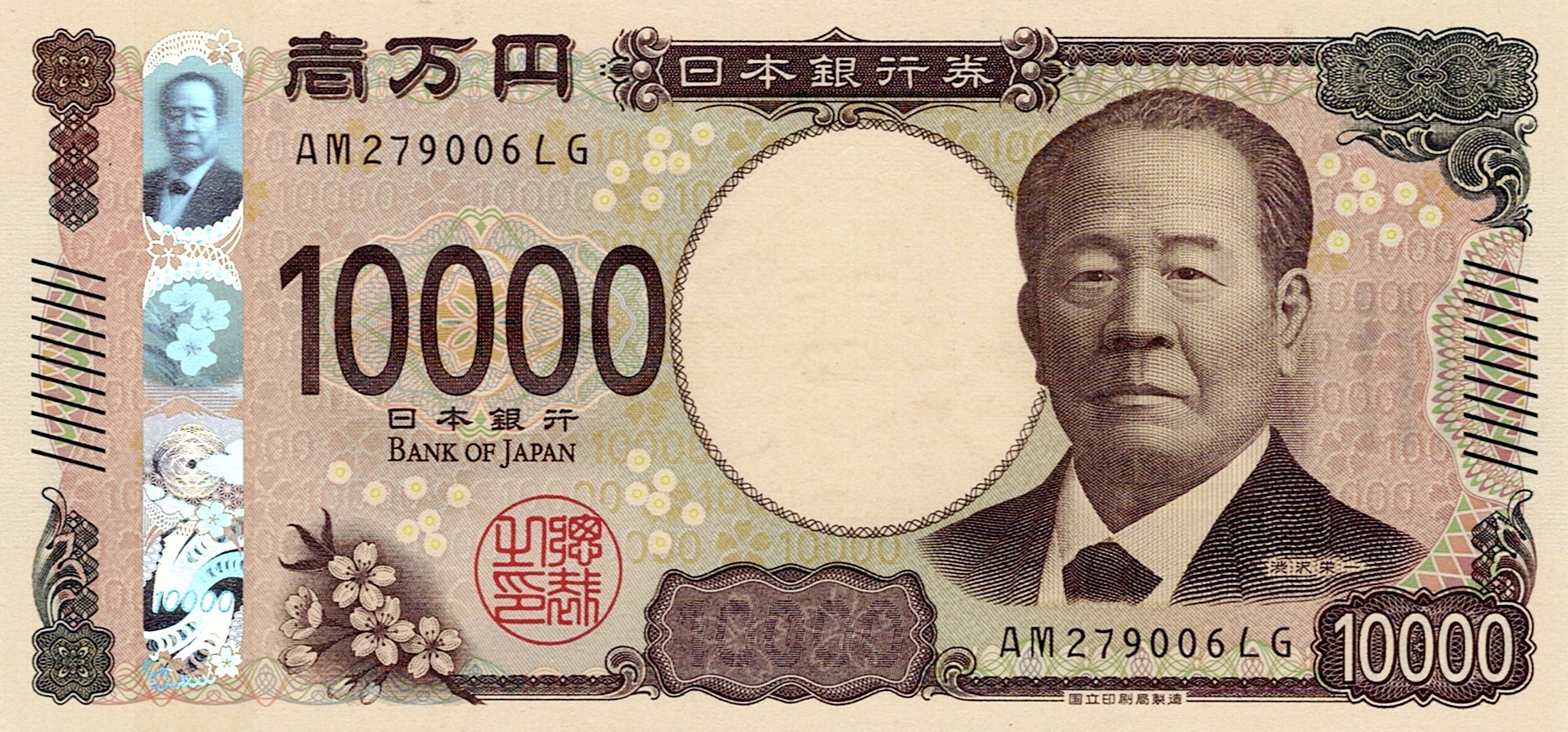
- Design: Portrait of Shibusawa Eiichi

Reverse
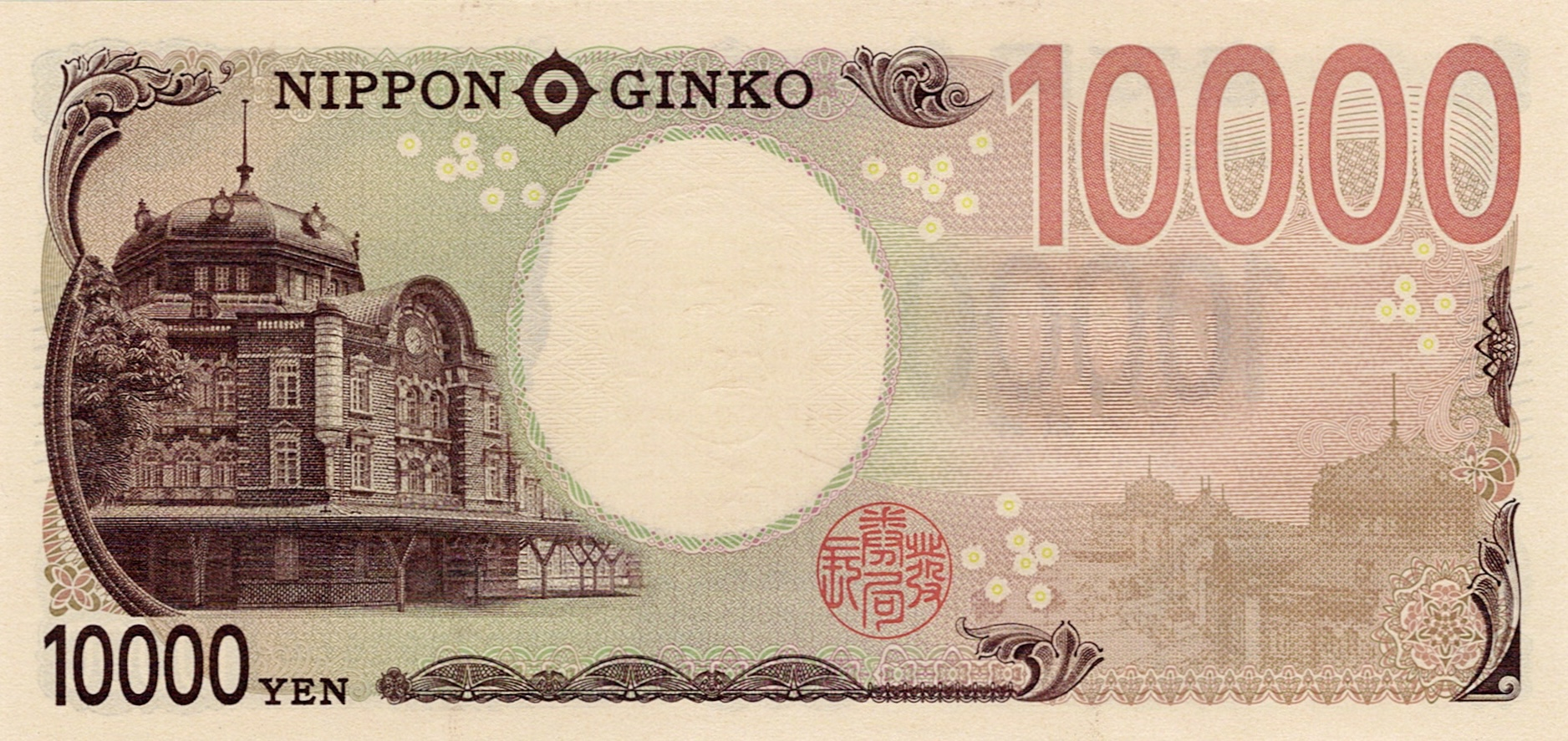
- Design: Tokyo Station (Marunouchi side)

The ¥10,000 note (Japanese: 1万円紙幣, Hepburn: Ichiman-En Shihei) is a yen banknote circulated in Japan. It is the highest denomination of banknote currently issued by the Bank of Japan. Apart from the commemorative 100,000 yen coin, it is the highest denomination of the Japanese yen.

It was first introduced in Japan in 1958 to the third series of banknote releases, Series C. The latest release is Series F, with printing of this series commencing in 2024.

== Series ==
=== Series C ===
The note was introduced on 1 December 1958. The brown-green note includes Prince Shōtoku on the front and a pillar painting of Hōō (鳳凰, Fenghuang), in the Hall of the Phoenix, Byōdō-in, Kyoto on the back.

=== Series D ===
The note was released on 12 September 1984. The brown note has Fukuzawa Yukichi, a Meiji era philosopher and the founder of Keio University, on the front and a pair of green pheasants on the back.

=== Series E ===
The series was released on 1 November 2004. The obverse retains most of the design of the Series D note, including the portrait of Fukuzawa, but adds additional patterns and new security features. The back of the note sees the return of a drawing of the Hōō in Byōdō-in.

Extensive anti-counterfeiting measures are present in the banknote. They include intaglio printing, holograms, microprinting, fluorescent ink, latent images, watermarks, and angle-sensitive ink.

=== Series F ===
The series was released on 3 July 2024. The ¥10,000 bill features Shibusawa Eiichi and Tokyo Station.

On 1 September 2021, it was announced via the Bank of Japan's Twitter account that printing of the new note design had commenced in preparation for the intended rollout in 2024.

The ¥10,000 banknote has an average life-span of 4~5 years before they need to be replaced.

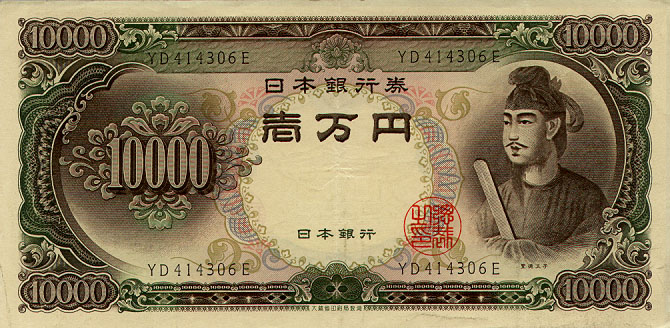
Series C 10,000 yen note (1957)

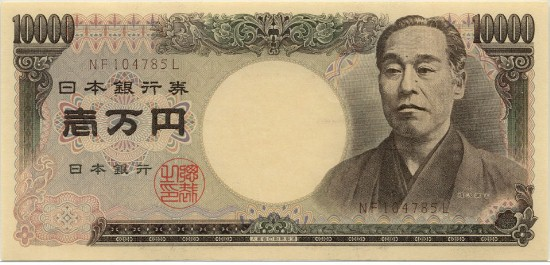
Series D 10,000 yen note (1984)

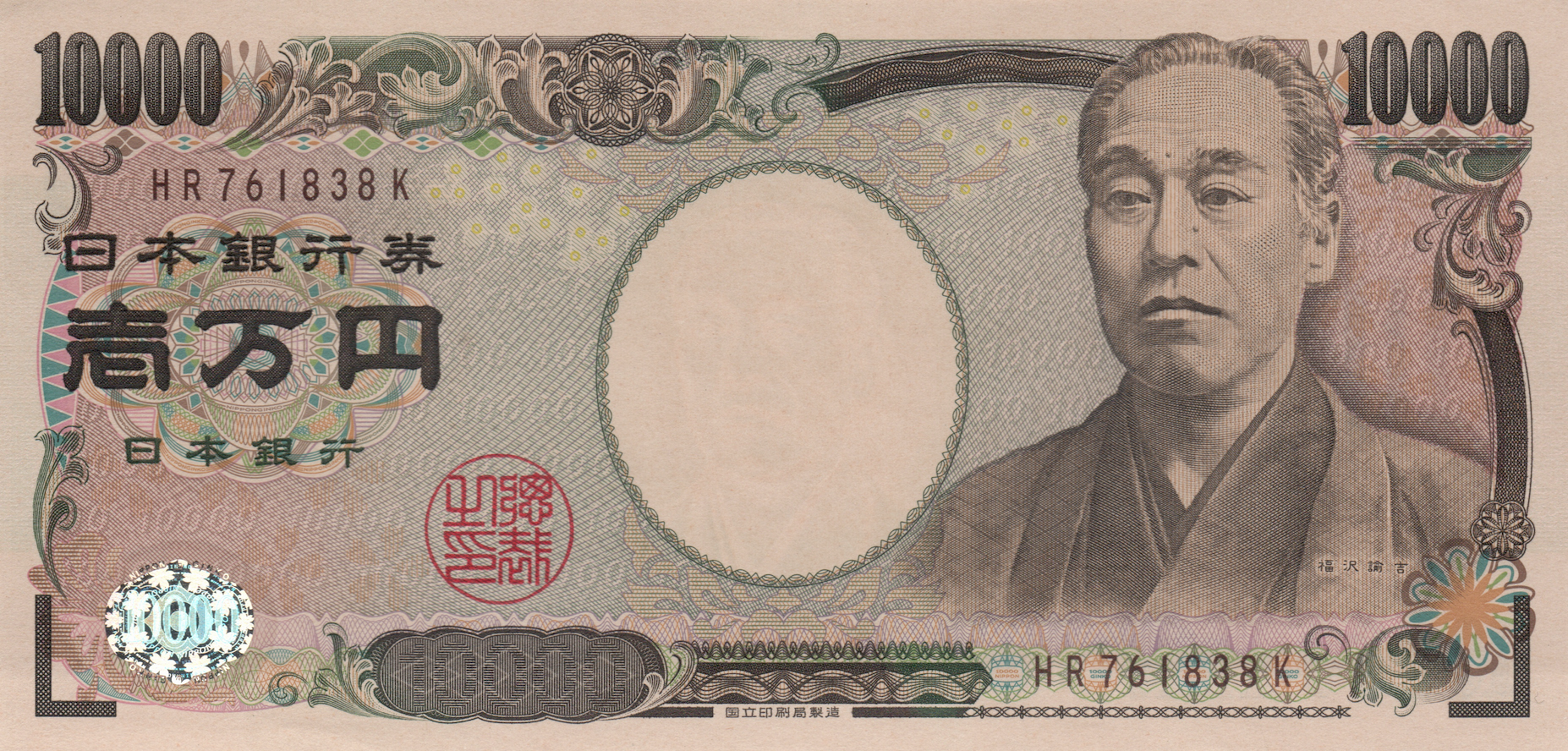
Series E 10,000 yen note (2004)

== See also ==
- 10,000 yen coin
- Banknotes of the Japanese yen
