= 5000 yen coin =

Five-thousand yen
- Japan
- Value: 5,000 Japanese yen
- Mass: (Silver) 15 g, (Gold) 7.8 g
- Diameter: (Silver) 30 mm, (Gold) 20 mm
- Edge: Reeded
- Composition: .925 Silver (1990-1998) (Note: This excludes the 1993 wedding commemorative which was struck in pure silver.).999 Gold (2021)
- Years of minting: 1990–2021 (Note: Non consecutive)

Obverse
- Design: Varies by year

Reverse
- Design: Varies by year

The 5,000 yen coin is a denomination of the Japanese yen used only for commemoratives struck by the Japan Mint. These are made only for collectors who purchase them directly from the mint at a premium. 5000 yen commemorative coins have historically been struck in a silver alloy since 1990. This practice changed in 2021 when gold was used for the first time for a coin celebrating 150 years of Japan's modern currency system. Measurements for the coins in terms of width and weight have remained the same except for the gold issue when these were lowered. Earlier coins were also once struck in the millions before the alloy change took place.

== History ==
The first 5000 yen coins were struck in 1990 (year 2 of Heisei) in a sterling silver alloy to commemorate three occasions. For the Osaka Garden Exposition, coins were minted that feature a right facing bust of the goddess Flora with flowers in her hair on the obverse. The reverse of the coin meanwhile features the official logo used for the event which was in the form of a flower. Two centennials are celebrated on the other issues which include Japan's Judiciary System and National Diet. The latter of these coins features the diet building on the obverse and "100 years since establishment of congress" on the reverse. Mintage figures for these first issues are 10,000,000 coins struck for Osaka, and 5,000,000 each for the two centennials respectfully.

Only one commemorative coin was struck in 1993 which celebrates the wedding of then Crown Prince of Japan Naruhito to then princess Masako. These were the first 5,000 yen coins to be struck in both regular (uncirculated) and proof format, and were issued in box sets along with 500 and 50,000 yen wedding commemoratives. The design chosen for the 5000 yen coin depicts a pair of cranes in flight on the obverse, while the reverse has the Imperial Crest. These coins are unique to other 5000 yen silver coins that have been struck up to the present as a pure silver alloy was used for this occasion.

5000 yen commemorative coins were minted again in sterling silver to celebrate the 1998 Winter Olympics, which were held in the Japanese city of Nagano. The actual production of the coins however, took place in 1997 (9th year of Heisei) and lasted into 1998 (Heisei 10). They were then released in sets of three different series alongside 500 and 10,000 yen Nagano commemoratives. A limit of 5,000,000 coins each (133,000 for proofs) was set for the 5000 yen denomination. Three different Olympic themes were used on the obverse sides of the coins as a design feature: Hockey (series 1), Biathlon (series 2), and Paralympic Skier (series 3). For the reverse a Serow is featured along with the value and date.

Another 23 years passed before the Japan Mint made 5000 yen commemorative coins again. In 2021 (3rd year of reiwa) the Japan Mint produced a 0.25 oz gold coin to celebrate the 150th Anniversary of Japan's Modern Currency System. This coin is notable for being the first 5000 yen gold coin that was reduced in both weight and size, and the first 0.25 oz gold coin ever minted by Japan. The set diameter of 30 mm and weight of 15 g that had been used for all of the prior coins was changed to 20 mm and 7.8 g for this gold issue. For a design, the obverse features the character 圓 (yen) which was used on gold one yen coins issued in 1871. On the reverse, the chosen design combines features from all of Japan's currently circulating coins (¥1, ¥5, ¥10, ¥50, ¥100, & ¥500). These coins were limited to 20,000 struck, and were released individually inside special holders.

== List of commemoratives ==
- Japanese coins are read with a left to right format:

"Emperors name" → "Number representing year of reign" → "Year" (Ex: 平成 → 2 → 年).

Image	Japanese date	Gregorian date	Mintage (Note: Proof mintages are in parentheses)	Reason
	2 Heisei	1990	10,000,000	Osaka Garden Exposition
	2 Heisei	1990	5,000,000	Centennial of the Judiciary System
	2 Heisei	1990	5,000,000	Centennial of the Diet of Japan
	五 (5) (Note: The emperor's reign (year of coin) is written in Kanji.); Heisei	1993	4,800,000 (200,000)	Wedding of the Crown Prince
	9 Heisei	1997	4,867,000 (133,000)	1998 Nagano Olympics (Hockey)
	9 Heisei	1997	4,867,000 (133,000)	1998 Nagano Olympics (Biathlon)
	10; Heisei	1998	4,867,000 (133,000)	1998 Nagano Olympics (Paralympic Skier)
	3 Reiwa	2021	20,000	150th Anniversary of Modern Currency System

== Collecting ==
The value of any given coin is determined by survival rate and condition as collectors in general prefer uncleaned appealing coins. Finding a worn or cleaned example isn't an issue for this denomination as they were specially made for collectors. In terms of added value, its debated within the numismatic community if breaking up modern proof sets to grade individual coins is a worthwhile investment or not.
