= The 5,000 =

The 5,000 or the 5000 may refer to:

- The oligarchy of "the 5,000", see Athenian coup of 411 BC
- Feeding of the 5,000
- The 5000 metres long-distance running event

== Money ==
- The 5000 yen note
- The 5000 yen coin
- The 5,000 Argentine peso banknote featuring Juan Bautista Alberdi
- The 5,000 Icelandic króna banknote featuring Ragnheiður Jónsdóttir
- The 5,000 Russian ruble banknote featuring the Khabarovsk Bridge
- United States five-thousand-dollar bill

== See also ==
- 5000 (disambiguation)
- The 5,000 Fingers of Dr. T.
