= Senpukan =

Coordinates: 34°41′53″N 135°31′17″E

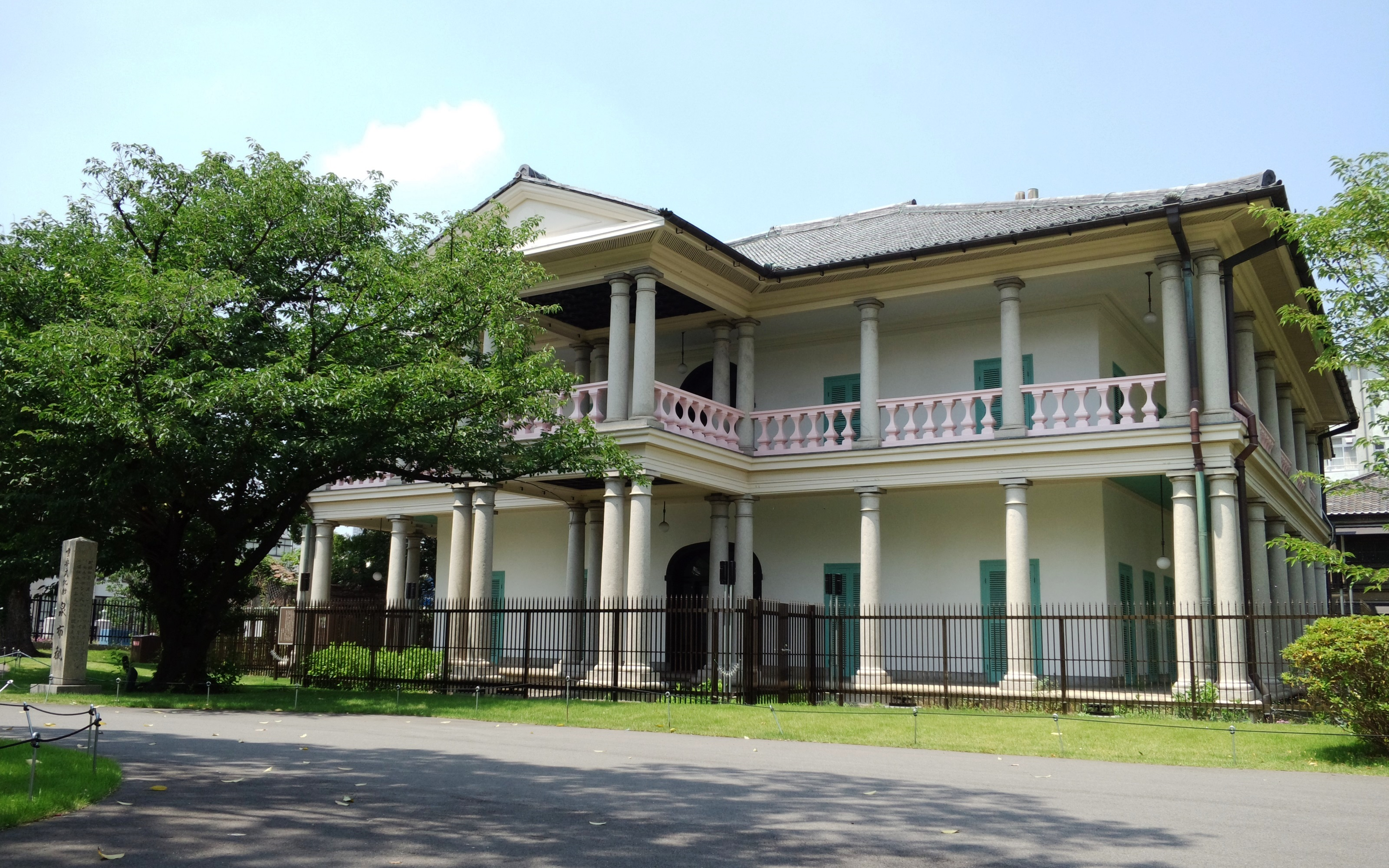
View of Senpukan from the North East

The Sempukan (Japanese: 泉布観) is a historic building in Osaka, Japan. It used to function as a guest house for the Japanese Mint Bureau. Designed by Thomas Waters, it is the oldest Western-style building in the city. The Meiji Emperor stayed at Sempukan during his visit to Osaka in 1872.

== Architecture ==
Using local materials and bricks, the building was constructed according to the Colonial Veranda style. The granite outer pillars are of Italian Tuscany design. Inside, it is beautifully decorated with high ceilings and chandeliers. The building is also equipped with western style toilets that use running water for flushing. All rooms on the 2nd floor are equipped with its own fireplace and a special throne room was constructed to accommodate the Emperor and other members of the imperial family during their visits.

== Current condition ==
Due to its age and state of deterioration, the Sempukan is currently undergoing renovation and closed to the general public.

== See also ==
- Japan Mint
- Veranda
