= Webb Ellis Cup =

Rugby trophy

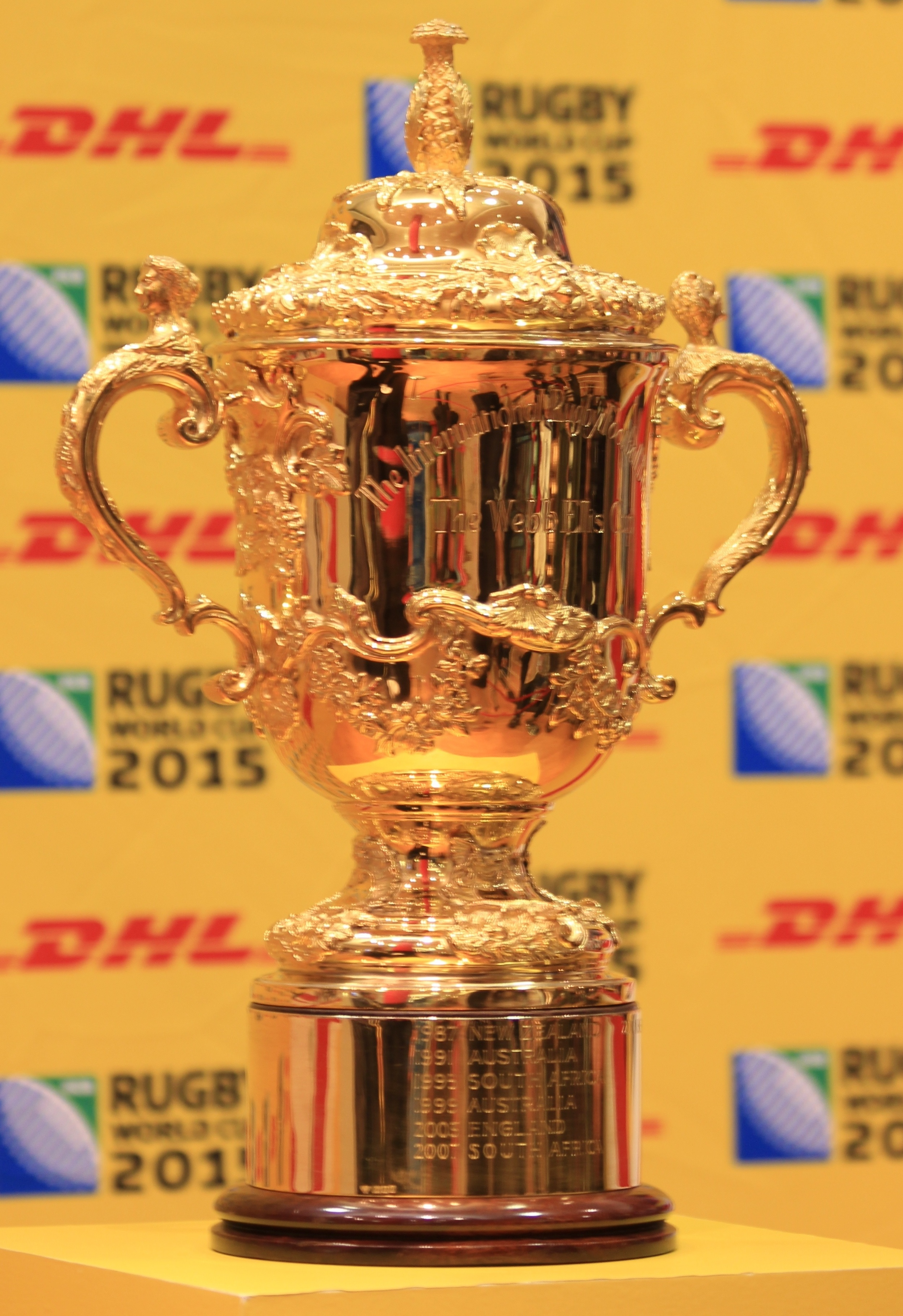
- Webb Ellis Cup in 2015
- Sport: Rugby union
- Competition: Rugby World Cup
- Awarded for: Winning the Rugby World Cup
- Local name: Cwpan Webb Ellis (Welsh); Cupa Webb Ellis (Scots Gaelic); Paetukutuku Ellis Cup (Māori); ウェッブエリスカップ (Japanese); უებ ელისის თასი (Georgian)
- Nickname: "Bill"
- Presented by: World Rugby

History
- First award: 1987; 39 years ago
- First winner: New Zealand (1987)
- Most wins: South Africa (4 times)
- Most recent: South Africa (2023)
- Website: rugbyworldcup.com

The Webb Ellis Cup is the trophy awarded to the winner of the men's Rugby World Cup, the premier competition in men's international rugby union. The Cup is named after William Webb Ellis, who is often credited as being the inventor of rugby football. The trophy is silver gilt and has been presented to the winner of the Rugby World Cup since the first competition in 1987. It has been won four times by South Africa (1995, 2007, 2019 & 2023), three times by New Zealand (1987, 2011 & 2015), twice by Australia (1991 & 1999), and once by England (2003).

The 38-centimetre trophy weighs 4.5 kg, is gilded silver and has two cast scroll handles. One handle bears the head of a satyr, the other the head of a nymph. On the face of the trophy, the words International Rugby Football Board, and below that arch The Webb Ellis Cup are engraved. The Webb Ellis Cup is also referred to (incorrectly) as the "Webb Ellis Trophy" or colloquially as "Bill," a nickname coined by the 1991 Rugby World Cup winners, the Wallabies.

== History ==
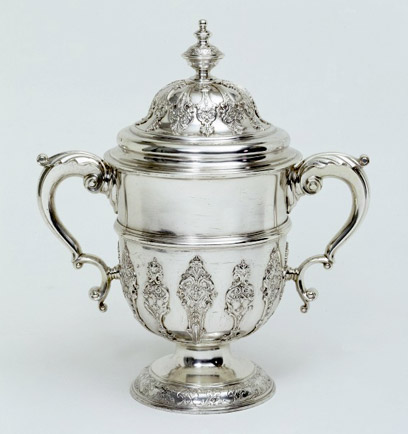
The cup and cover by Paul de Lamerie inspired Carrington and Co to design the trophy.

There are two official Webb Ellis Cups, which are used interchangeably. One is a 1911 trophy made by Carrington and Co. of London, featuring a Victorian design of a 1740s cup by Paul de Lamerie, while the other is a 1986 replica.

John Kendall-Carpenter, former England forward and the organiser of the first Rugby World Cup, and Bob Weighill, the secretary of the International Rugby Board and also a former England forward, visited Garrard & Co, the crown jeweller in Regent Street, London. Director Richard Jarvis brought the particular cup down from the vault and showed it to both of them.

It was chosen for use in February 1987. Ronnie Dawson of Ireland, Keith Rowlands of Wales, Bob Stuart and Dick Littlejohn of New Zealand and the Australians Nick Shehadie and Ross Turnbull approved the choice of the trophy.

It was soon named "The Webb Ellis Cup". New Zealand became the first nation to win the Webb Ellis Cup when they won the 1987 Rugby World Cup. The Webb Ellis Cup has been held by four nations: New Zealand, Australia, South Africa, and England.

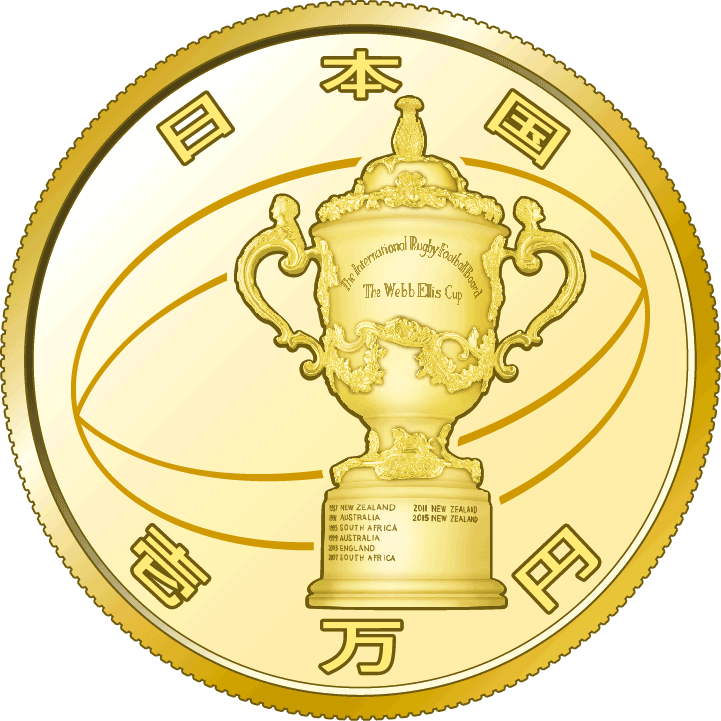
Japanese gold 10,000 yen coin depicting the Webb Ellis Cup

The current holders are South Africa, after they beat New Zealand 12–11 in the 2023 Final in France. The trophy was on display in Newlands, South Africa until 2009, where it had stayed for two years following their victory in the 2007 tournament. Later, it was returned to the home of World Rugby, Ireland. One cup recently went on tour around the New Zealand provinces along with the Dave Gallaher Trophy, Bledisloe Cup, Hillary Shield, Women's World Cup, World Rugby Sevens Series and the Junior World Cup trophies.

=== Webb Ellis Cup restoration and repairs ===
The Rugby World Cup trophy is restored by Thomas Lyte. The London-based company also acts as the official goldsmiths for the Webb Ellis Cup and restores or repairs the World Cup at the completion of each tournament and when required at any given period in the intervening years between one competition ending and the next beginning.

Thomas Lyte are also responsible for hand-engraving the name of the victorious team on the plinth of the trophy. The plinth features the names of every winner since the inaugural tournament in 1987.

== See also ==
- Paul Barrière Trophy
