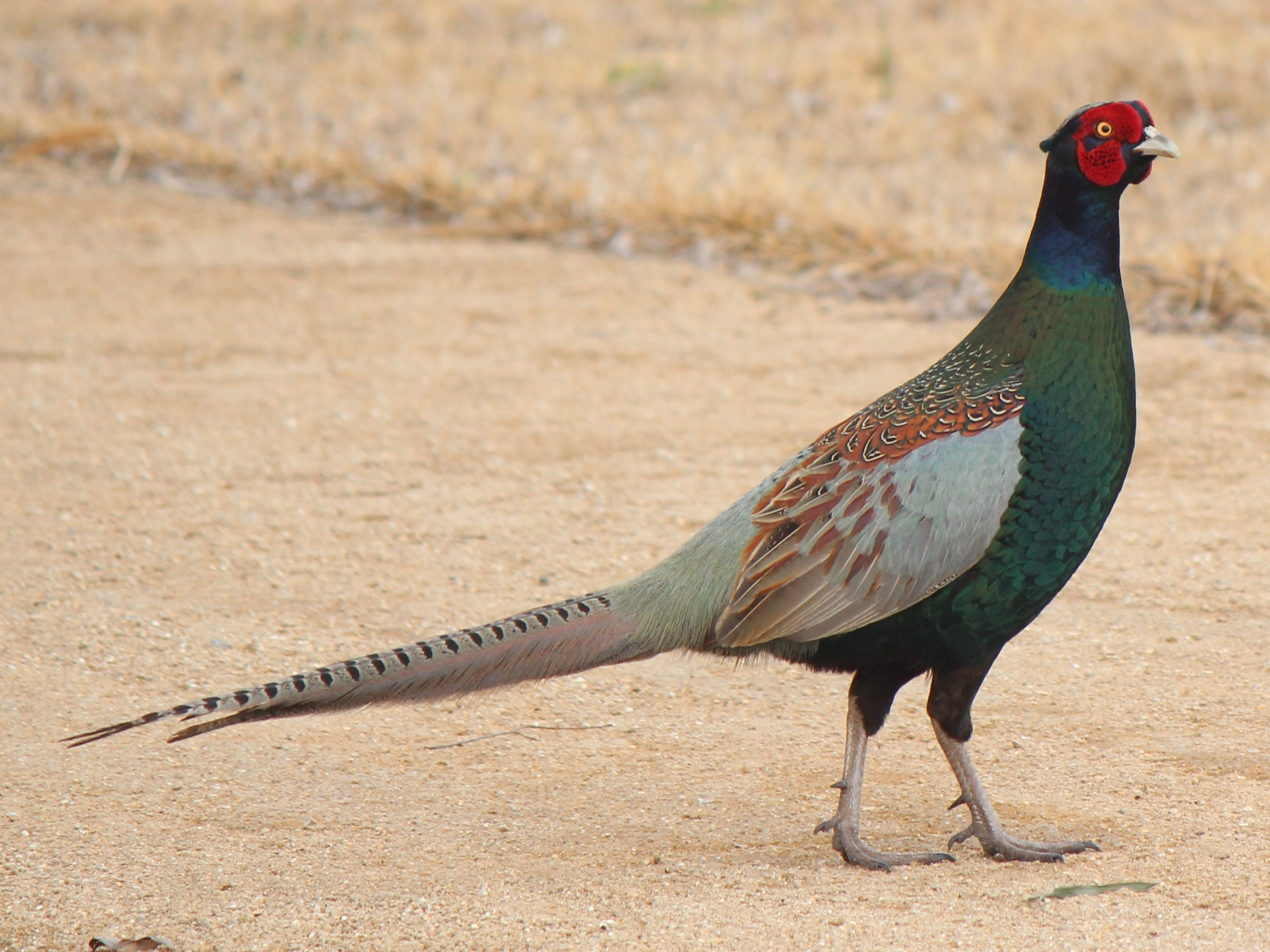
- Male in Japan
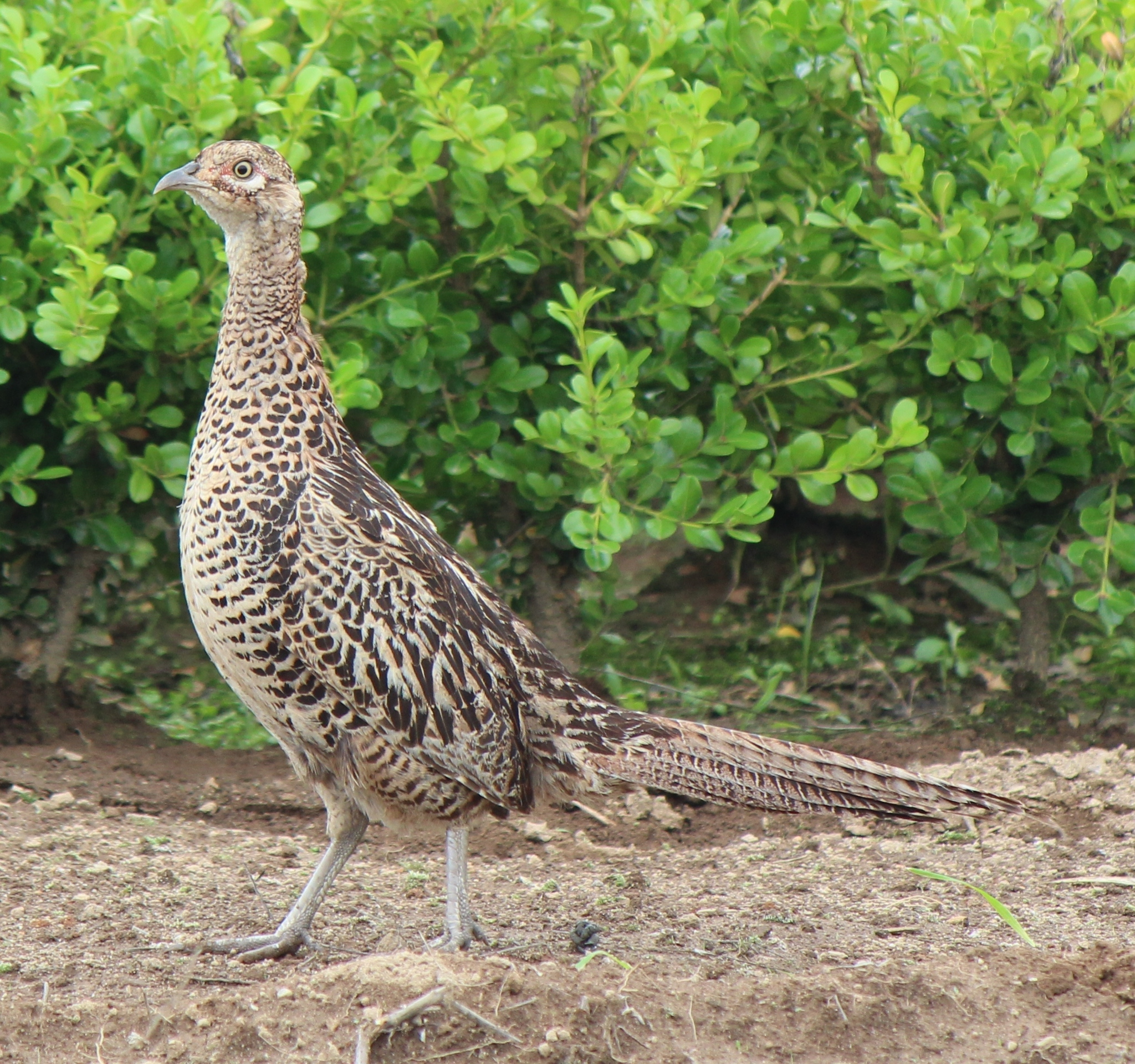
- Female in Japan

Conservation status
- Least Concern (IUCN 3.1)

Scientific classification
- Kingdom: Animalia
- Phylum: Chordata
- Class: Aves
- Order: Galliformes
- Family: Phasianidae
- Genus: Phasianus
- Species: P. versicolor

Binomial name
- Phasianus versicolor Vieillot, 1825

Synonyms
- Phasianus colchicus versicolor

= Green pheasant =

Species of bird

The green pheasant (Phasianus versicolor), also known as the Japanese green pheasant or Kiji, is an omnivorous bird native to the Japanese archipelago, to which it is endemic. Some taxonomic authorities consider it a subspecies of the common pheasant, Phasianus colchicus. It is the national bird of Japan.

== Taxonomy and systematics ==
Some sources claim that the green pheasant is a subspecies of the common pheasant, though others claim that they are separate, though closely related, species. The green pheasant has three subspecies. The nominate subspecies, P. v. versicolor, is called the southern green pheasant or kiji. The Pacific green pheasant, P. v. tamensis, and northern green pheasant, P. v. robustipes, are the other two subspecies. There are some cases of hybrids between the green pheasant and the copper pheasant or common pheasant. Interbreeding of between green and common pheasants is the origin of a melanistic variant of common pheasant found in English populations.

== Description ==
The male (cock) southern green pheasant, P. v. versicolor, has dark green plumage on the breast, neck, mantle, and flanks. The male also has a bluish-purplish hood with clear ear tufts, red wattles, and a long, pale grey-banded tail. The female (hen) is smaller than the male, with a shorter tail, and has brownish-black colored plumage, with dark brown feathers fringed pale brown. The males of this subspecies have the darkest plumage, which is mainly green. The male Pacific green pheasant, P. v. tamensis, has lighter plumage than the nominate subspecies. Its feathers are more purple and blue. The male northern green pheasant, P. v. robustipes, has the lightest plumage and its crown and mantle are more bronze than those of the other subspecies. The females of all three subspecies look much more similar, though, like with the males, the females of P. v. versicolor normally have the darkest plumage and the females of P. v. robustipes have the lightest.

== Behavior ==
=== Diet ===
In the wild, green pheasants eat small animals, such as worms and insects, grains and plants. They are, in captivity, sometimes fed pellets, seeds, plants and live food.

=== Breeding ===
The green pheasants' breeding season starts during March or April and ends in June. Green pheasants can first breed when they are about one year old. One clutch has between six and fifteen eggs. The eggs are incubated for 23 to 25 days.

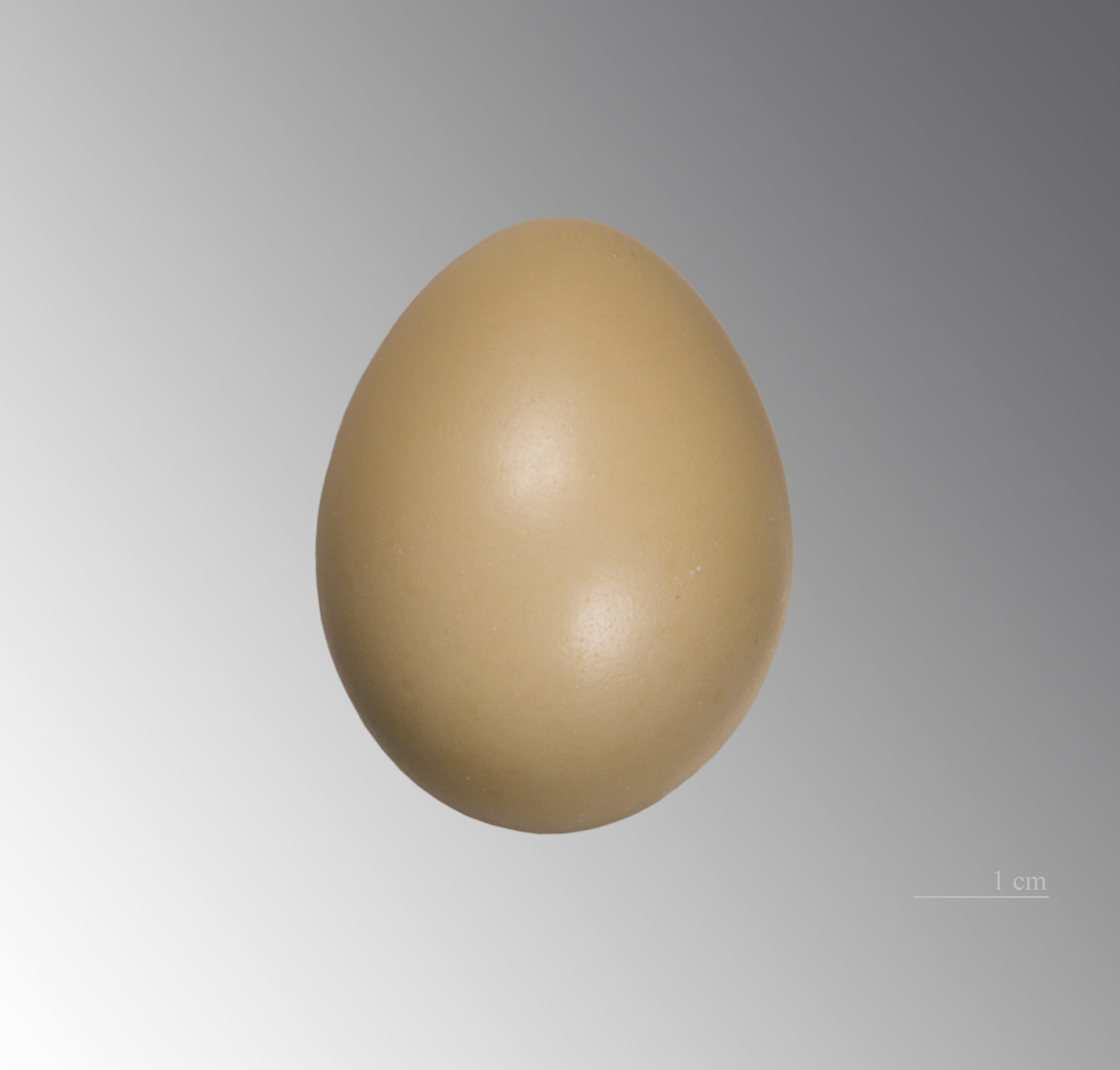
A green pheasant egg

A female green pheasant in the wild in rural Kanagawa, Japan

== In culture ==
In Japan, many people claim that green pheasants are scared by earthquakes and 'scream'. They are the national bird of Japan because the way the female walks together with its chicks is seen as a symbol of harmony. It was featured on the Japanese 10,000 yen note.

== Habitat and distribution ==
It is found throughout Honshu, Shikoku, and Kyushu as well as some smaller islands; it has also been introduced in Hawaii and (unsuccessfully) in North America as a gamebird. It inhabits woodlands and forest edges, brush, grassland, and parkland.

This species is common and widespread throughout its native range. It often frequents farmlands and human settlements. The introduced populations in Hawaii are stable. Populations in Western Europe have perhaps bred with the common pheasant for a number of years and no pure green pheasants exist there any longer. This species has been crossed with the common pheasant on some game farms in North America and released.

In its native range, the green pheasant outcompetes introduced populations of common pheasant; despite the two species close relation, they have differing ecological requirements, and the common pheasant is less adapted to the ecology of the green pheasant's range.

== Conservation ==
Though the green pheasant population is decreasing, it is not severely fragmented. On a local and national level, green pheasants are used for food, sport hunting, specimen collecting and as pets or display animals. None of these practices are found on an international level. The green pheasant is one of the 29 designated 'game species' in Japan. These are the only species that can legally be hunted. A hunting license is required.

== Gallery ==
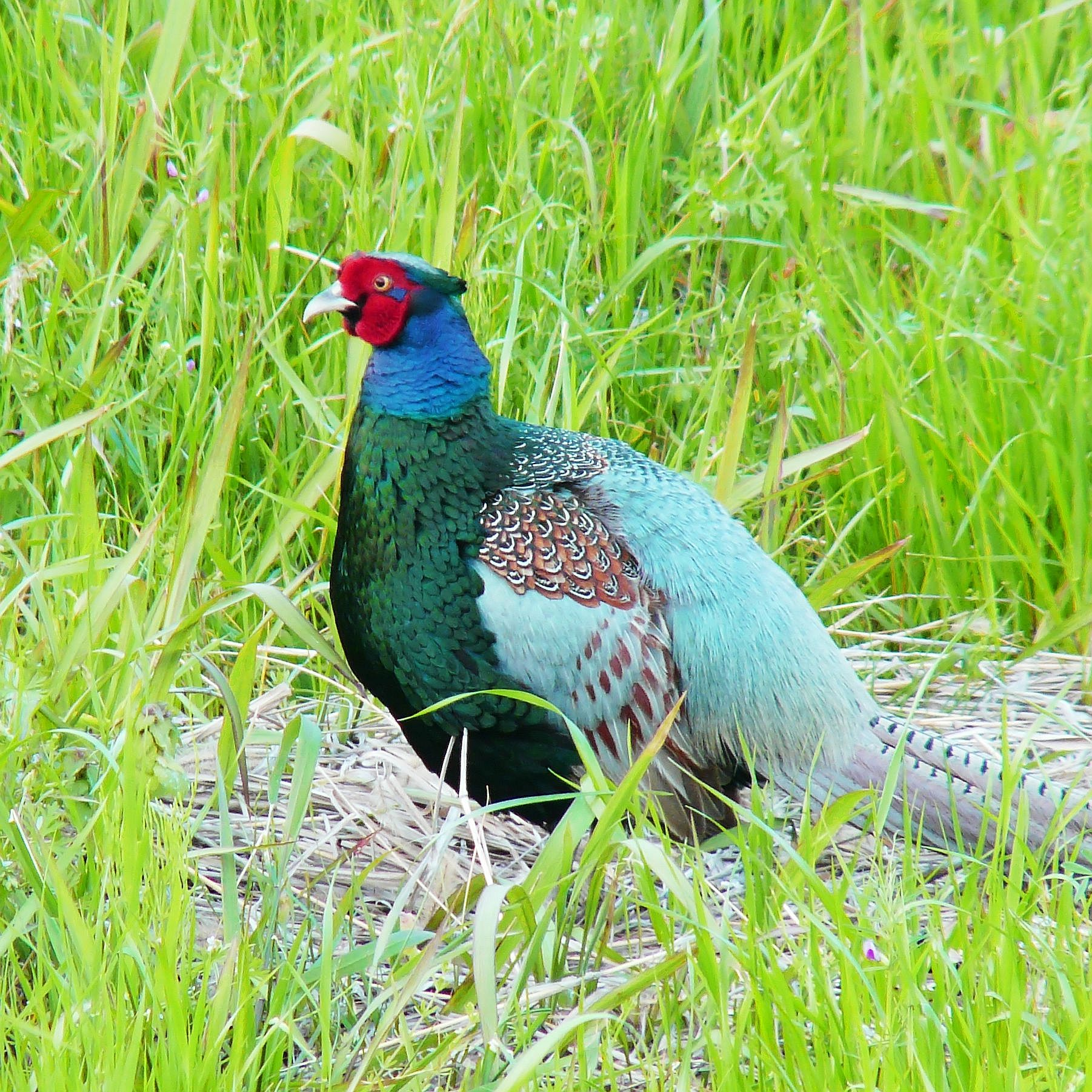
Male in Japan

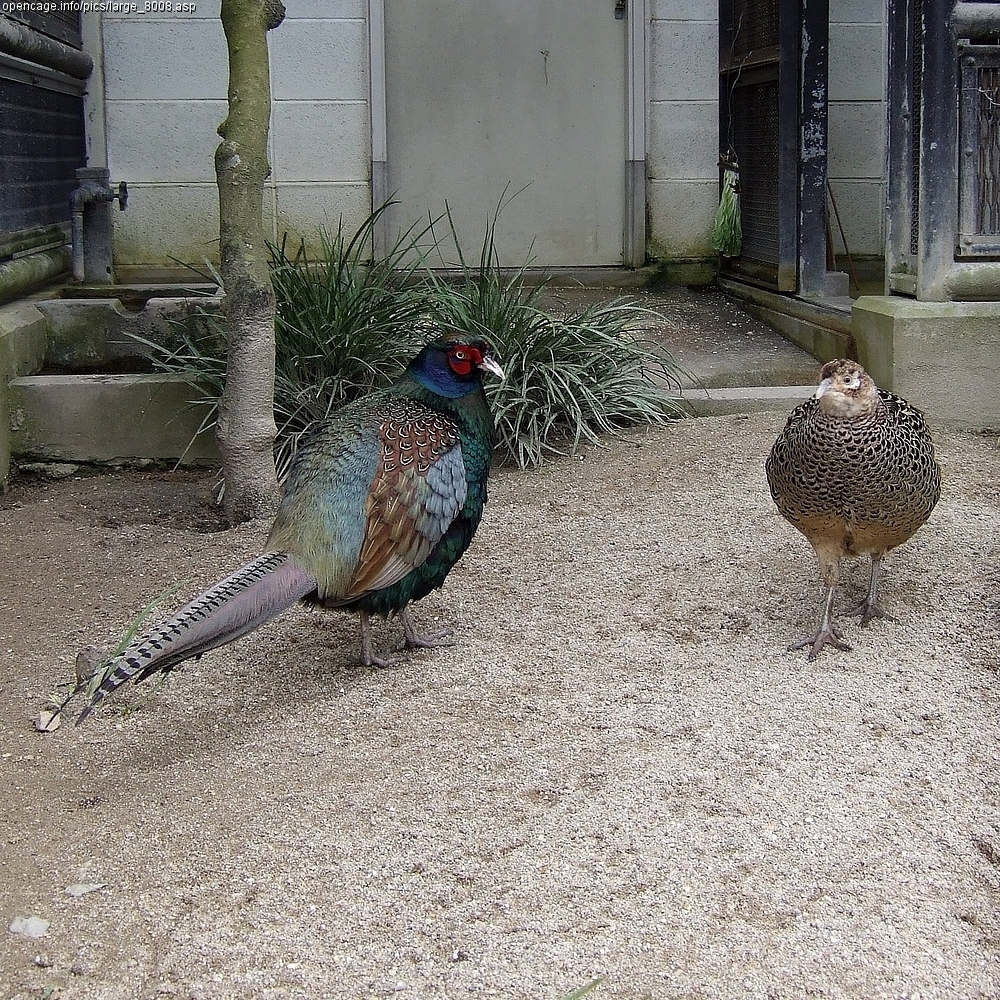
Male (left) and female.
Uniform color of male (with no white on neck) and spotted underside of female are characteristic.
