= 100,000 yen coin =

Japanese commemorative coin

One hundred-thousand yen
- Japan
- Value: 100,000 Japanese yen
- Mass: 20 - 30 g
- Diameter: 30 - 33 mm
- Edge: Reeded
- Composition: .999 Gold
- Years of minting: 1986–1987; 1990
- Catalog number: -

Obverse

Reverse

The 100,000 yen coin is a denomination of the Japanese yen. Only two different types of coins have ever been struck in this denomination, which is only used for the minting of commemorative coins struck by the Japan Mint. Proof coinage and uncirculated examples were made for collectors, none were ever intended or released for circulation.

== History ==
The 100,000 yen coin is the highest non circulating denomination ever issued by the Japan Mint. Only two different types of coins have ever been struck in this denomination. The issues include celebratory events such as Hirohito's 60th year of reign from 1986 to 1987, and the enthronement of Emperor Akihito in 1990.

== Commemoratives ==
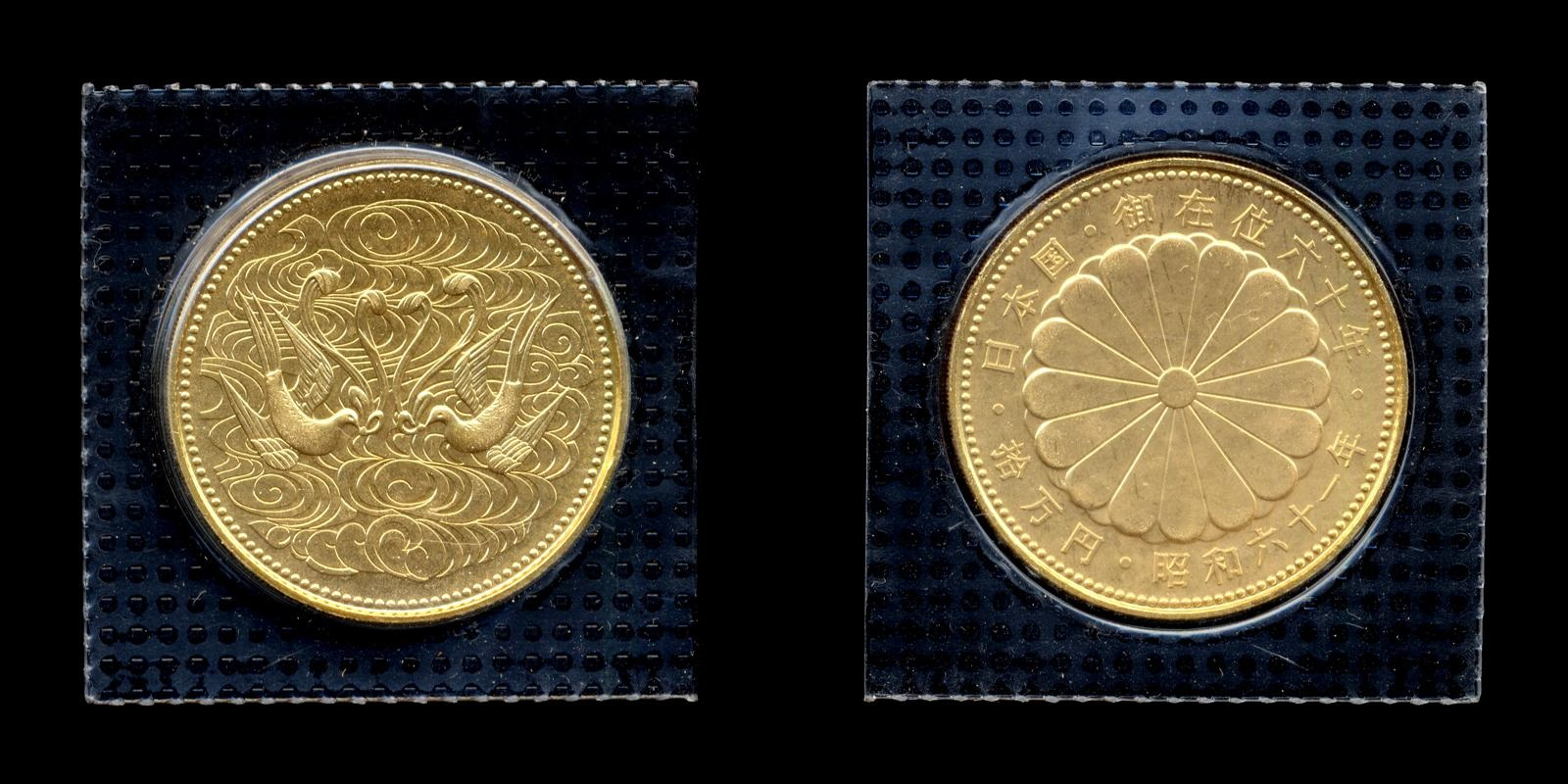
Hirohito's 60th year of reign (1986)

| Emperor | Japanese date | Gregorian date | Mintage (Note: Proof mintages are: 1987 - 124,513 1990 - 100,000) | Reason |
|---|---|---|---|---|
| Shōwa | 六十一 (61) | 1986 | 10,000,000 | Hirohito's 60th year of reign |
| Shōwa | 六十二 (62) | 1987 | 875,487 | Hirohito's 60th year of reign |
| Akihito | 二 (2) | 1990 | 1,900,000 | Enthronement of Emperor Akihito |
