= Thomas Waters (architect) =

Irish civil engineer and architect

Thomas James Waters
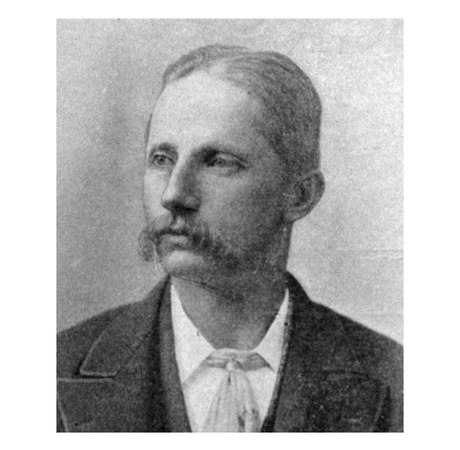
- Born: 17 July 1842; Birr, County Offaly, Ireland
- Died: 5 February 1898 (aged 55); Denver, Colorado, United States
- Occupation: Architect

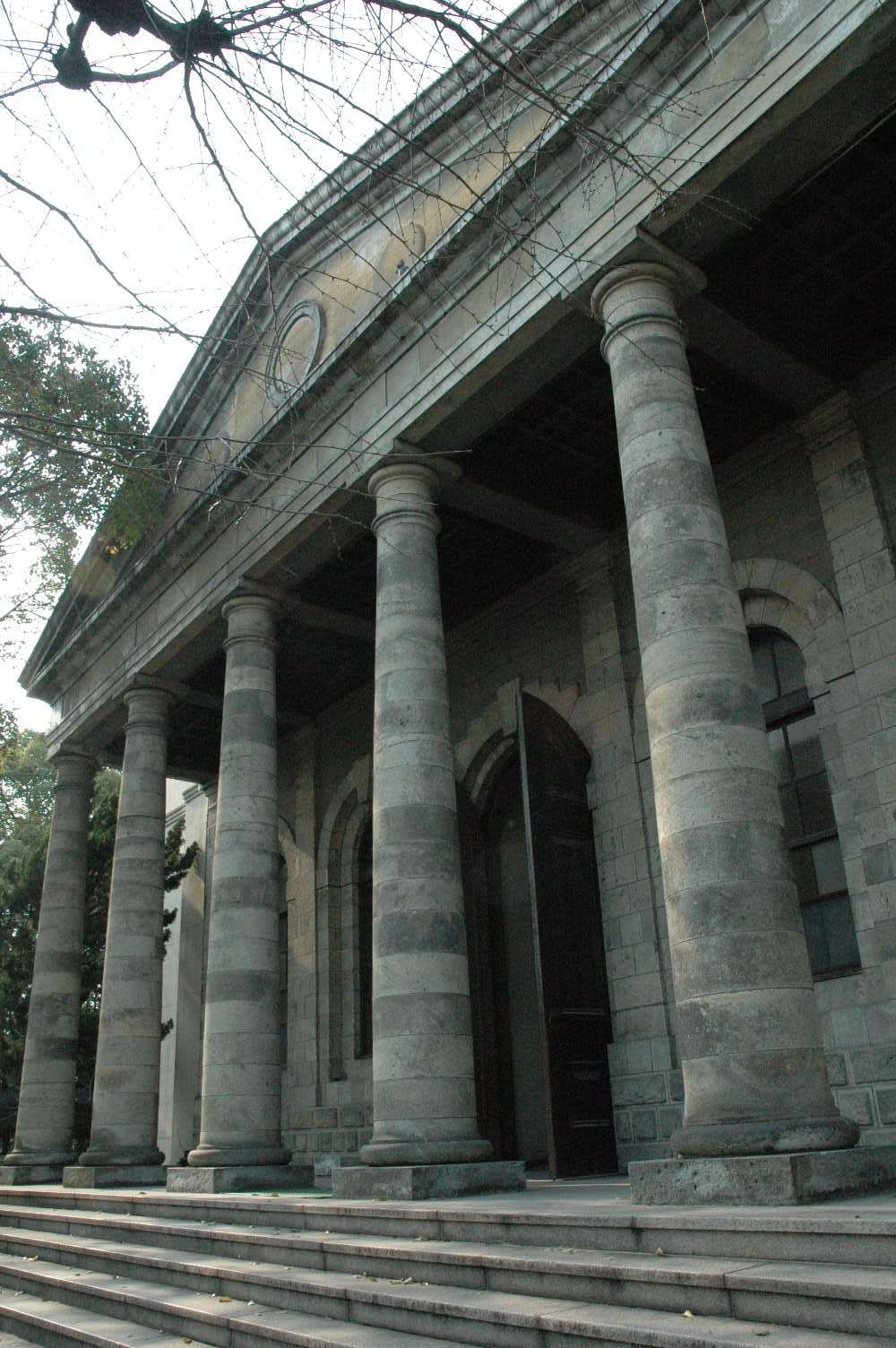
Former Mint of Japan, Osaka

Thomas James Waters (17 July 1842 – 5 February 1898) was an Irish civil engineer and architect. He was active in Bakumatsu and early Meiji period Japan.

== Life ==
Waters was born in Birr, County Offaly, in Ireland in 1842, as the eldest son of the local surgeon, John Waters. It is thought he left Ireland young, and was educated in England and Germany.

Waters died in Denver, Colarado on 5 February 1898 at the age of 55.

== Career ==
In 1864, while in his early 20s, he appears to have become involved in the building of the Royal Mint in Hong Kong. Through his uncle, Albert Robinson, he came into contact with representatives of Thomas Blake Glover, a noted British merchant resident in Nagasaki. Glover arranged for Waters to be employed by Satsuma Domain to construct steam-powered sugar mills on the island of Amami-Oshima, and he then moved to Kagoshima to design western-style buildings in 1867. After the Meiji Restoration of 1868, Waters was hired by the new Meiji government and commissioned to build the new Imperial Japanese Mint in Osaka, which was commenced in 1868 and completed in 1870.

After successfully completing this commission, he was invited to Tokyo and officially accepted as foreign advisor by the government, where his title was "Surveyor-General". He helped design a branch of the Japanese Mint in the Ginza area of Tokyo, designed and built the headquarters building for the Imperial Japanese Army and a bridge in the Tokyo Imperial Palace grounds, Tokyo. However, his largest commission came after a devastating by fire in 1872 destroyed the Ginza district. Tom Waters, his brother Albert Waters, and English colleague A N Shillingford, supervised the rebuilding of the Ginza area with a broad central thoroughfare, lined with a series of one- and two-story Georgian brick buildings there. The district was henceforth known as Bricktown (Rengagai), and came to be regarded as a symbol of modernity and westernisation in Japan.

He worked briefly in Shanghai, China before working as a mining engineer in the South Island of New Zealand. He then joined his brothers, Ernest and Albert in the United States where they became involved in silver and gold mining in Denver, Colorado.
