= 50,000 yen coin =

Fifty-thousand yen
- Japan
- Value: 50,000 Japanese yen
- Mass: 18 g
- Diameter: 27 mm
- Edge: Reeded
- Composition: .999 Gold
- Years of minting: 1993
- Catalog number: Y109

Obverse

Reverse

The 50,000 yen coin is a denomination of the Japanese yen. Only one coin was ever issued for this denomination which commemorated the wedding of Crown Prince Naruhito to Masako. These coins did not circulate, and were made in uncirculated and proof coinage format for collectors by the Japan Mint.

== Commemorative ==
Image	Emperor	Japanese date	Gregorian date	Mintage	Reason
	Akihito	五 (5)	1993	1,900,000 (100,000 in proof)	Wedding of the Crown Prince
