= 10,000 yen coin =

Japanese coin denomination

Ten-thousand yen
- Japan
- Value: 10,000 Japanese yen
- Edge: Reeded
- Composition: .999 Silver (First issue).999 Gold (current issue)
- Years of minting: 1986–present (Note: Non consecutive)
- Catalog number: -

Obverse
- Design: Varies by year

Reverse
- Design: Varies by year

The 10,000 yen coin is a denomination of the Japanese yen, and is only used for the issue of commemorative coins struck by the Japan Mint. 10,000 yen coins were first issued in the mid/late 1980s in silver but were later switched to gold. These non consecutive commemorative gold coins have been released ever since to collectors.

== History ==
The first 10,000 yen coin was minted in 1986 as a silver commemorative to mark the 60th year of the enthronement of the Shōwa Emperor, Hirohito. Gold has been used to strike these coins in proof only format since 1997 when they were first issued for the 1998 Winter Olympics in Nagano. The weight and size of each coin varies by commemorative as both 15.6g (26mm) and 20.0g (28 - 35mm) have been used.

== List of commemoratives ==
| Image | Japanese date | Gregorian date | Mintage | Reason |
|---|---|---|---|---|
| | 六十一 (61); Shōwa | 1986 (Silver) | 10,000,000 | Hirohito's 60th year of reign |
| | 六十二 (62); Shōwa | 1987 (Silver) | Unknown | Hirohito's 60th year of reign |
| | 9 Heisei | 1997 | 55,000 | 1998 Nagano Olympics (Ski Jumping) |
| | 9 Heisei | 1997 | 55,000 | 1998 Nagano Olympics (Figure Skating) |
| | 10; Heisei | 1998 | 55,000 | 1998 Nagano Olympics (Speed skiing) |
| | 11; Heisei | 1999 | 200,000 | 10th anniversary of the enthronement of Akihito |
| | 14; Heisei | 2002 | 100,000 | 2002 FIFA World Cup |
| | 16; Heisei | 2004 | 70,000 | EXPO 2005 AICHI JAPAN |
| | 21; Heisei | 2009 | 100,000 | 20th anniversary of the enthronement of Akihito |
| | 27; Heisei | 2015 | 14,000 | The Great East Japan Earthquake Reconstruction Project - 1st Series |
| | 27; Heisei | 2015 | 11,000 | The Great East Japan Earthquake Reconstruction Project - 2nd Series |
| | 27; Heisei | 2015 | 10,000 | The Great East Japan Earthquake Reconstruction Project - 3rd Series |
| | 27; Heisei | 2015 | 10,000 | The Great East Japan Earthquake Reconstruction Project - 4th Series |
| | 30; Heisei | 2018 | 40,000 | 2020 Tokyo Summer Olympics (First Issue) |
| | 31; Heisei | 2019 | 10,000 | 2019 Rugby World Cup |
| | 31; Heisei | 2019 | 50,000 | 30th anniversary of the enthronement of Akihito |
| | 元 (1); Reiwa | 2019 | 50,000 | Enthronement of Naruhito to the Chrysanthemum Throne |
| | 元 (1); Reiwa | 2019 | 40,000 | 2020 Tokyo Summer Olympics (Third Issue) |
| | 2 Reiwa | 2020 | 41,000 | 2020 Tokyo Summer Olympics (Fourth Issue) |
| | 3 Reiwa | 2021 | 20,000 | 150th Anniversary of Japan's Postal System |
| | 3 Reiwa | 2021 | 20,000 | 150th Anniversary of Modern Currency System |
| | 4 Reiwa | 2022 | TBD | 50th Anniversary of the Reversion of Okinawa to Japan |
