= Japan Mint =

Government coin producer of Japan

Coordinates: 34°41′48.6″N 135°31′16.3″E

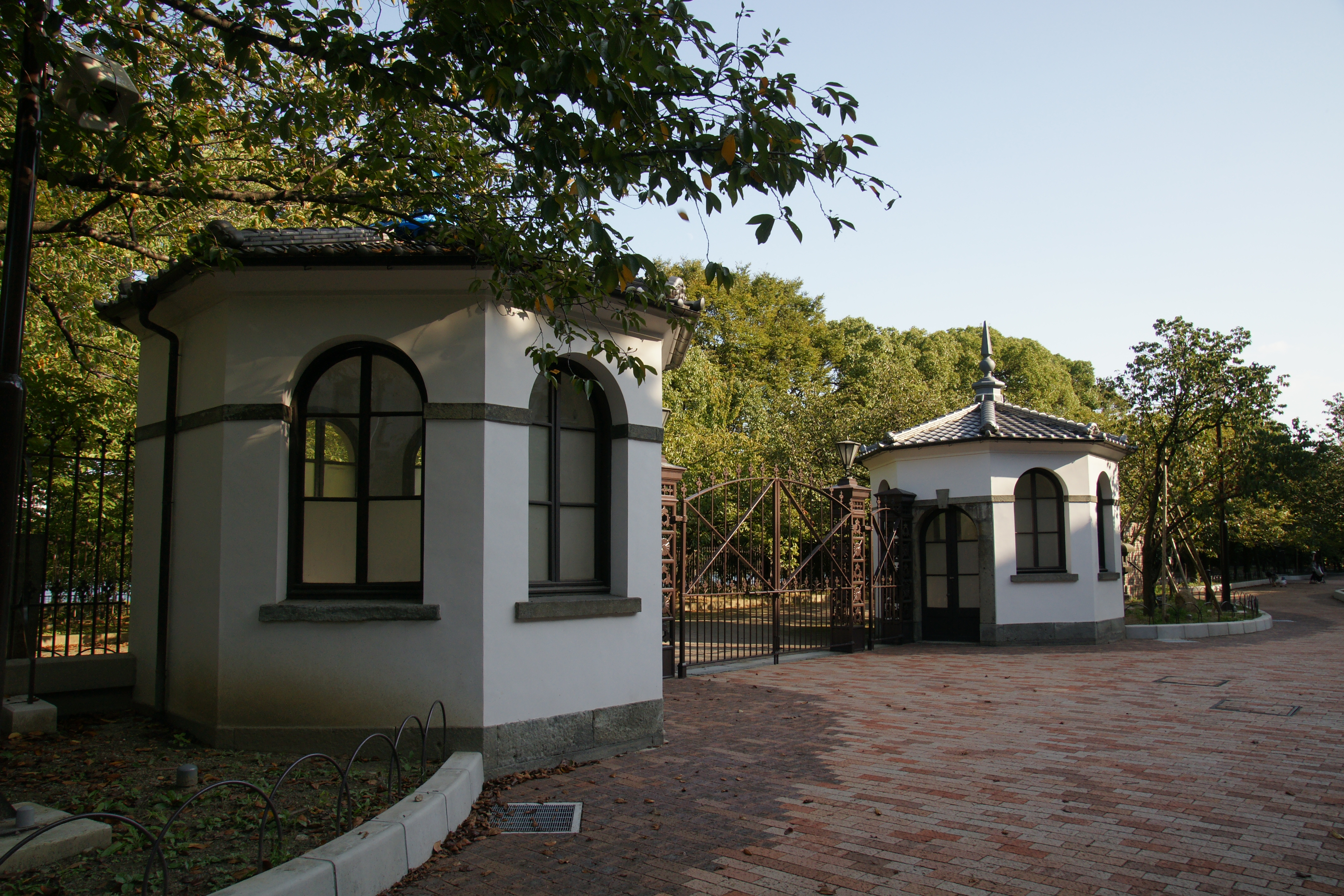
- Japan Mint Osaka's front gate
- Type: Independent Administrative Institution
- Industry: Coins
- Founded: 1871; 155 years ago
- Headquarters: Osaka, Japan
- Area served: Japan
- Owner: Government of Japan
- Website: mint.go.jp

The Japan Mint (独立行政法人造幣局, Dokuritsu Gyōsei Hōjin Zōheikyoku) is an Independent Administrative Institution of the Japanese government, responsible for producing and circulating the coins of Japan. The agency has its head office in Osaka with branches in Saitama and Hiroshima. The Japan Mint does not produce paper money; that responsibility belongs to the National Printing Bureau.

== History ==
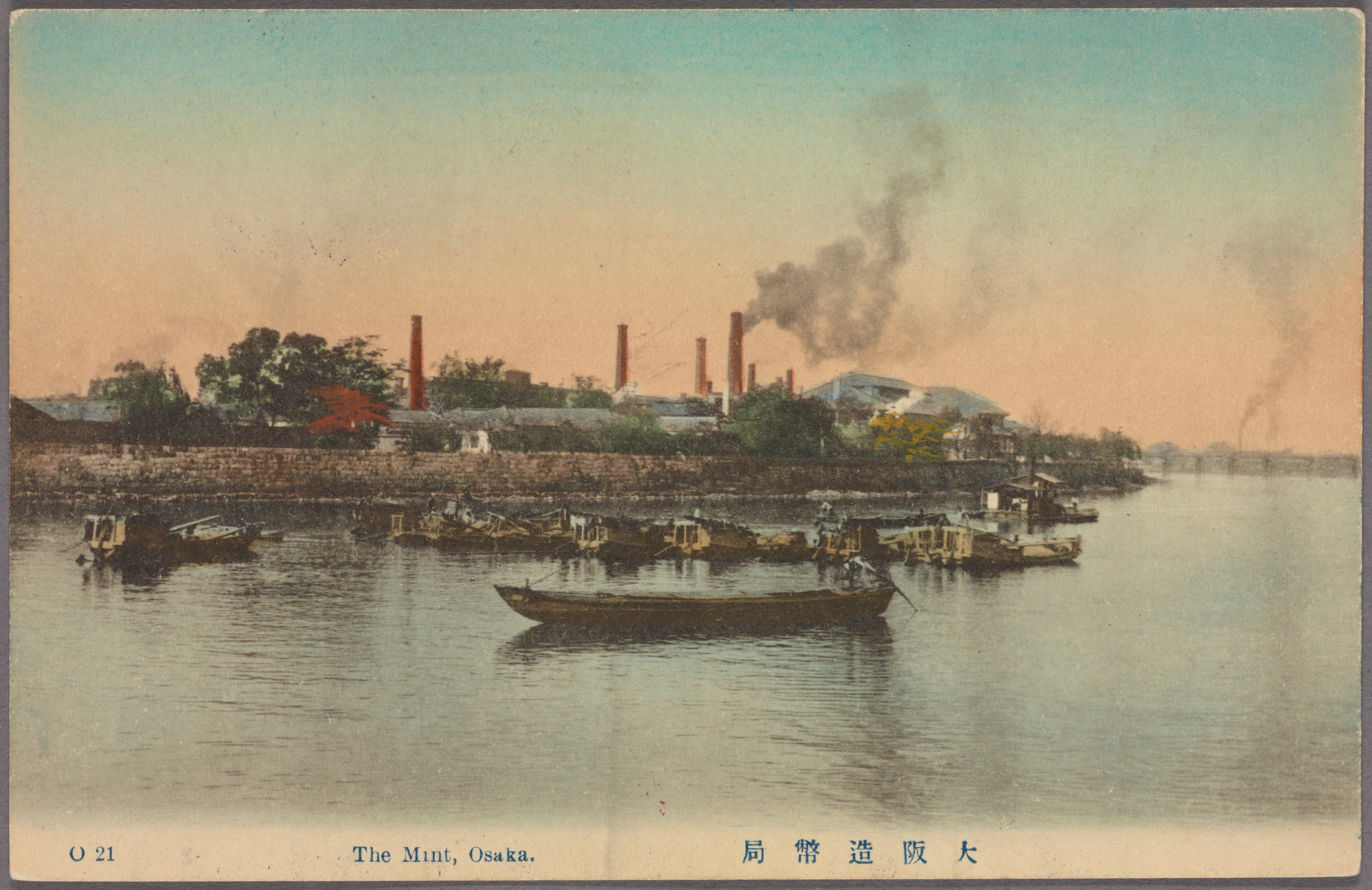
The Mint, 1907

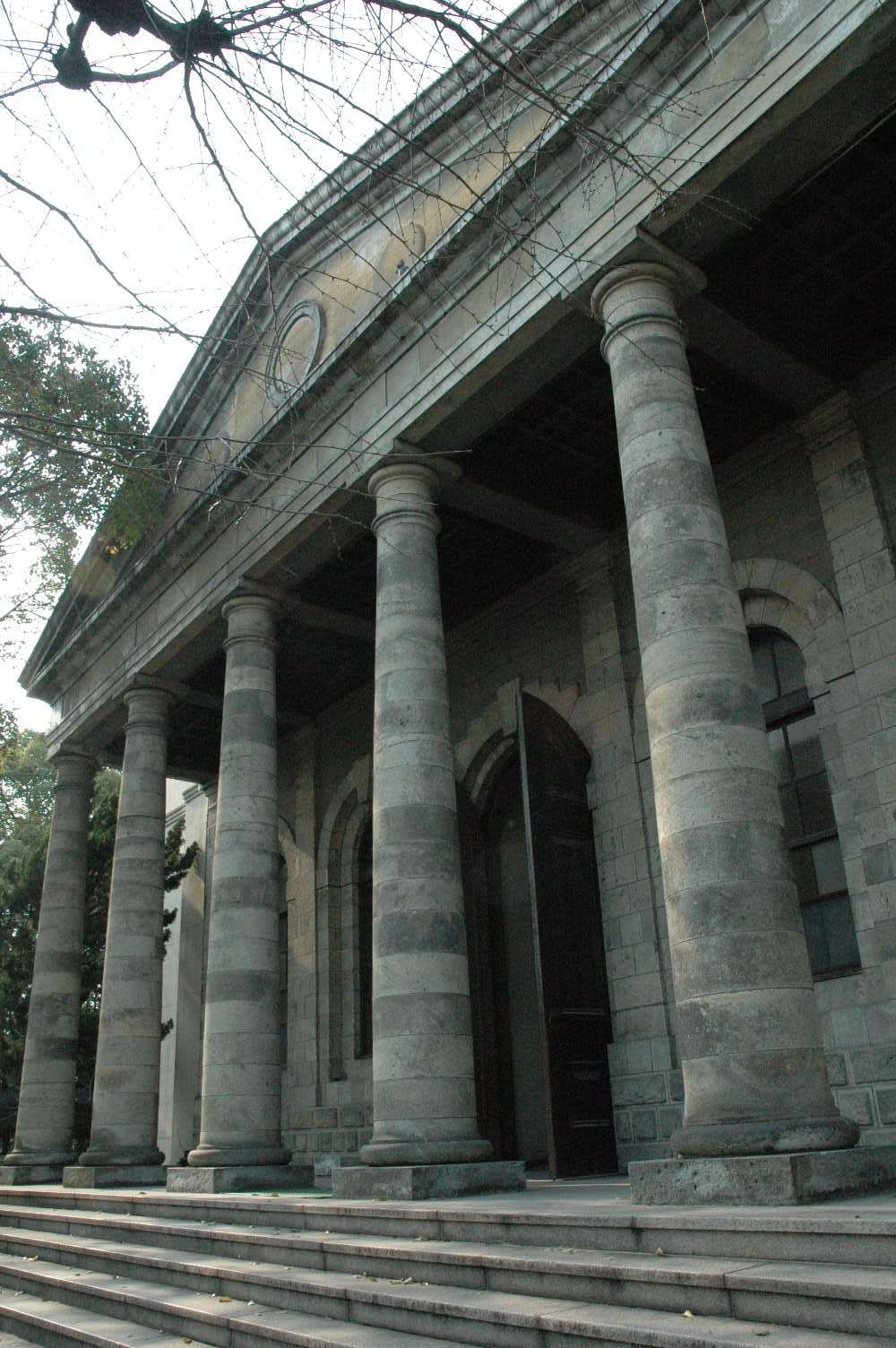
Preserved façade of the 1871 original Mint Building in Osaka

Amongst the first acts of the Meiji government was the establishment of the Imperial Japanese Mint as a constructive step towards modernising Japan's circulating currency. In the early Meiji era, paper currency was initially printed by Dondorf and Naumann in Germany. The European production was inspected and sealed by Banknote Annex Office of the Ministry of Finance. A proposal to construct a banknote manufacturing plant was submitted to Grand Council of State in May 1874; and construction was approved in December of that same year. A two-story Western red brick building was completed in October 1876.

Over the course of decades, the Mint activities have expanded to include the production of Japanese orders (decorations), medals of honor and metallic art objects, the analysis and testing of metal ores and minerals, and the fineness certification of precious metal wares (hallmarking).

The Mint became an Incorporated Administrative Agency on April 1, 2003.

=== Osaka head office ===
- 1871: After an inaugural ceremony was held in Kawasaki, Osaka on 4 April, the actual work of minting coins began. The mint's work was urgently necessary to rectify confusion over coins which was a recurrent feature of the Tokugawa period.

=== Saitama branch ===
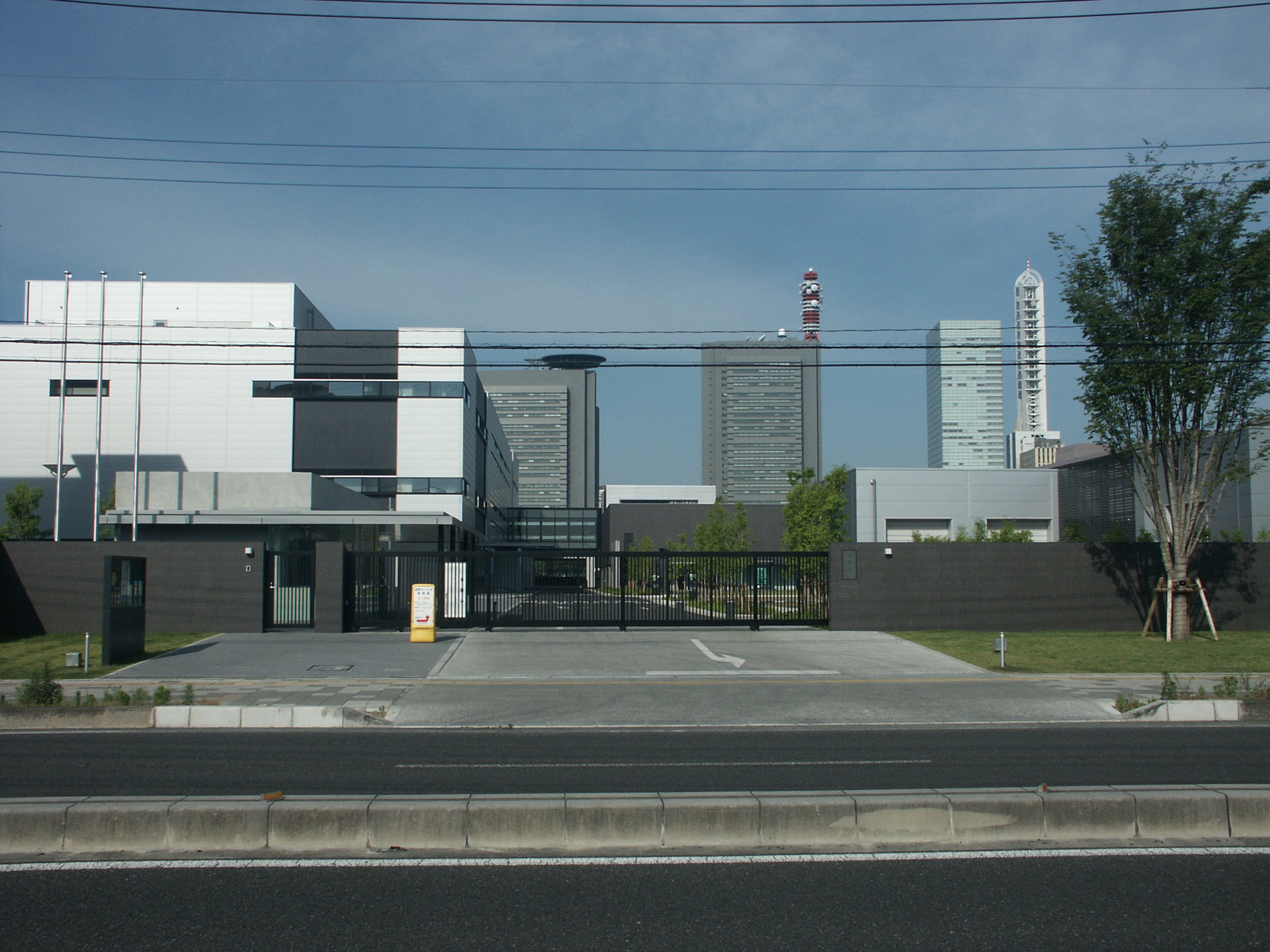
- Saitama branch in 2017
  1879: This branch of the Mint was set up in the Ministry of Finance building. The primary function of this office was to accept gold and silver to be made into coins which would then be returned to the bearer; however the sub-branch was abolished in 1907.
- 1929: The branch is established at Kōjimachi-ku, Tokyo. The primary function of this office focused on certifying the fineness certification of precious metal wares.
- 1939: The branch moved to Toshima-ku to enable the expansion of its operations.
- 2016: The branch moved to the present address in Saitama.

=== Hiroshima branch ===
- 1942: The construction of a minting plant in Hiroshima Prefecture was decided with the aim of minting coins in Japan for various Southeast Asian countries.
- 1945: The minting of coins in Hiroshima was initially begun in February; but production was stopped later in that year because of an atomic bombing.
- 1946: Operations resumed at the present address.
- 1948: The branch becomes capable of managing the entire coinage process.

== Standards ==
Japan Mint has sought to bring its operations within an ambit proposed by the International Standard for Quality Management System and Environmental Management System (ISO).

== See also ==
- Independent Administrative Institution
- Ministry of Finance (Japan)
- Japanese yen
- Japanese Proof Set
- Senpukan
- National Printing Bureau
